= Monica (given name) =

- Pronunciation: /ˈmɒnɪkə/
- Gender: Female

Origin
- Origin: uncertain
- Meaning: unique, to advise, alone, nun, solitary

Other names
- Related names: Monika; Monique; Moonika; Mona; Masculine forms: Mónico

Monica is a female given name with many variant forms, including Monica (Italian), Mónica (Spanish and Portuguese), Mônica (Brazilian Portuguese), Monique (French), Monika (German and Lithuanian), Moonika (Estonian), and Mónika (Hungarian).

== History ==
The etymology of Monica is unknown. Its earliest known attestation is as the name of Saint Monica, mother of Saint Augustine, in the Latin language. St. Monica was born in Roman Africa, but was also a citizen of Carthage, hence the name may be of Punic or Berber origin. It has also been associated with the Greek word monos, meaning "alone".

One of the early occurrences of the name in modern literature is the character Monica Thorne in the 1858 novel Doctor Thorne by Anthony Trollope.

=== Popularity ===
In the United States, the name's popularity reached a peak in 1977, when it was the 39th most popular female name for new births. The popularity has gradually waned since then, being 76th most popular in 1990, and 363rd in 2010.

== Name day ==
In the European tradition of name day celebration, the date for the name Monica or Monika varies from country to country:

- 4 May: Hungary, Sweden
- 7 May: Slovakia
- 21 May: Czech Republic
- 15 June: Finland, Greece
- 27 August: Italy, Poland, Portugal, Spain
- 6 October: Latvia

In Finland the version with one "o" belongs to the name day calendar of Swedish-speaking population, for Finland is a bilingual country. The name written with double-o, i.e. "Moonika" (as it would be pronounced anyway), has an unofficial name day on the same day, but the double-o version is less common.

== Notable people ==
- Monica Abbott (born 1985), American softball player
- Mónica Aguilar Bonilla (born 1980), Costa Rican archaeologist
- Mònica Aguilera Viladomiu (born 1974), Spanish mountain and raid runner
- Monica Aksamit (born 1990), American fencer
- Monica Aldama (born 1972), American cheerleading coach
- Mónica Alemán, Ecuadorian politician
- Monica Ali (born 1967), British author
- Monica Allanach (1920–2013), British actuary
- Monica Allison, American actress
- Mónica Alonso (born 1998), Spanish rhythmic gymnast
- Mónica Alvarado (born 1991), Mexican footballer
- Mónica Álvarez de Mon (born 1955), Spanish tennis player
- Monica Amekoafia (1934–1990), winner of the first Miss Ghana edition
- Monica Andersson (born 1953), Swedish orienteering competitor
- Monica Anghel (born 1971), Romanian musical artist
- Monica Anisie (born 1973), Romanian politician
- Mónica Antich (born 1966), Spanish synchronized swimmer
- Monica Arac de Nyeko (born 1979), Ugandan writer
- Mónica Arango, Colombian synchronized swimmer
- Mónica Araya, Costa Rican activist
- Monica Arnold (born 1980), American singer, professionally known as "Monica"
- Mónica Arreola, visual artist, architect and gallery director
- Mónica Arriola Gordillo (1971–2016), Mexican politician
- Monica Asman (1920–2016), American Catholic nun and research scientist
- Monica Aspelund (born 1946), Finnish singer
- Mónica Astorga Cremona, Argentine Carmelite
- Monica Attard (born 1958), Australian journalist and academic
- Mónica Ayos, Argentine actress
- Mónica Azón (born 1972), Spanish sailor
- Monica Babuc (born 1964), Moldovan politician and historian
- Monica Bachmann (born 1942), Swiss horse rider
- Monica Baly (1914–1998), English nurse and historian
- Monica Bandini (1964–2021), Italian road racing cyclist
- Monica Bannister, American actress
- Monica Barbaro (born 1990), American actress
- Monica Barham (1920–1983), New Zealand architect
- Monica Barnes (1936–2018), Irish politician
- Monica Bascio (born 1969), American Paralympic cyclist and skier
- Monica Baskin, American psychologist
- Monica Bastiani (born 1964), Italian basketball player
- Monica Bedi (born 1975), Indian actress and television presenter
- Monica Beletsky, American television producer and screenwriter
- Monica Bello, several people
- Monica Bellucci (born 1964), Italian actress
- Monica Beltran (born 1985), American soldier
- Mônica Benício, Brazilian architect and politician
- Monica Berg, Norwegian bartender
- Monica Bergamelli (born 1984), Italian artistic gymnast
- Mònica Bernabé (born 1972), Spanish journalist
- Monica Bertagnolli (born 1959), American surgical oncologist
- Mónica Bertolino (born 1957), Argentinian architect
- Mónica Bettencourt-Dias, Portuguese biochemist and cellular biologist
- Monica Bharel, commissioner of the Massachusetts Department of Public Health
- Monica Bhide, American engineer and writer
- Monica Biernat, American social psychologist
- Monica Bîrlădeanu (born 1978), Romanian actress and model
- Monica Birwinyo (born 1990), Ugandan actress
- Monica Bisordi (born 1982), American artistic gymnast
- Monica Blank, American electrical engineer
- Monica Bleibtreu (1944–2009), Austrian-German actress and screenwriter
- Monica Boggioni (born 1998), Italian Paralympic swimmer
- Mònica Bonell Tuset (born 1971), Andorran politician
- Monica Bonon (born 1964), Italian swimmer
- Monica Bonvicini (born 1965), Italian artist
- Mónica Bosch (born 1972), Spanish alpine skier
- Monica Jahan Bose, Bangladeshi artist and climate activist
- Mónica Bottero, Uruguayan journalist, writer and politician
- Monica Boyar (1920–2013), American singer
- Monica Brant (born 1970), American fitness/figure competitor and model
- Monica Brewster (1886–1973), New Zealand arts patron and women's rights advocate
- Monica Bridges (1863–1949), pianist and composer, wife of Robert Bridges
- Mónica Briones (1950–1984), Chilean painter and sculptor
- Monica Bristow, American politician
- Monica Brown, several people
- Monica Buonfiglio, Brazilian writer
- Monica Byrne (born 1981), American playwright and science fiction author
- Mónica Cabrera (born 1958), Argentinian writer and actor
- Monica Cafferky, British freelance journalist
- Mónica Cahen D'Anvers (born 1934), Argentine journalist
- Monica Calhoun (born 1971), American film and television actress
- Monica Calzetta Ruiz (born 1972), Spanish chess player
- Monica Caprini (born 1974), Italian women's international footballer
- Mónica Carrillo (born 1976), Spanish journalist and novelist
- Mónica Carrió (born 1977), Spanish weightlifter
- Mônica Carvalho (born 1971), Brazilian actress and former model
- Monica Casiraghi, Italian ultra runner
- Mónica Castaño (born 1989), Colombian model
- Monica Castelino, Indian actress
- Monica Cavanagh, Australian nun
- Monica Chakwera, spouse of the president of Malawi
- Monica Chan (born 1966), Hong Kong actress and spokesperson
- Monica Chang'anamuno, politician in Malawi
- Monica Chaudhary (born 1985), Indian actress
- Monica Chibita, Ugandan academic
- Monica Chinnakotla, Indian actress
- Monica Chintu, Zambian politician
- Monica Chitupila, Mozambican independence activist and politician
- Mónica Chuji (born 1973), Ecuadorian politician
- Monica Cirinnà (born 1963), Italian politician
- Monica Cirulli (born 1982), Italian synchronized swimmer
- Mónica Clapp, Mexican mathematician
- Monica Clare (1924–c. 1973), aboriginal political activist and author
- Monica Geike Cobb (1891–1946), English barrister
- Monica Coghlan, English prostitute
- Monica Cole (1922–1994), English geographer
- Monica Coleman, American theologian
- Monica Collingwood (1908–1989), American film editor
- Monica De Coninck (born 1956), Belgian politician
- Monica Conti (born 1964), Italian long-distance runner
- Monica Contrafatto (born 1981), Italian Paralympic athlete
- Monica Conyers (born 1965), American politician from Detroit, Michigan
- Monica Covacci (born 1971), Canadian artistic gymnast
- Monica Cox, engineer
- Monica Craciun, British-Romanian physicist and academic
- Mónica Astorga Cremona (born 1967), Argentine nun
- Monica Crowley (born 1968), American conservative pundit and television personality
- Mónica Cruz (born 1977), Spanish actress
- Monica De La Cruz (born 1974), American politician
- Monica Csengeri (born 1996), Romanian weightlifter
- Monica Cuenco (born 1994), Filipino singer
- Monica Cyrino, American classical scholar
- Monica Dacon (born 1934), Saint Vincent and the Grenadines schoolteacher, educator and politician
- Monica Dahl (born 1975), Namibian swimmer
- Monica Das, Indian economist
- Monica Day (born 1982), American broadcaster and beauty queen
- Monica Desai, Indian actress
- Monica Dickens (1915–1992), British author of books for adults and children
- Mónica Dionne (born 1967), American actress
- Monica Dogra (born 1982), American actress
- Monica Dolan (born 1969), English actress
- Monica Dolinsky, American association football player
- Mónica Domínguez Blanco (1984–2022), Spanish journalist
- Monica Dominique (born 1940), Swedish actor
- Monica Dongban-Mensem, Nigerian judge
- Mònica Dòria (born 1999), Andorran slalom canoeist
- Mónica Dossetti (born 1966), Mexican actress
- Monica Doti (born 1970), Brazilian table tennis player
- Monica Drake (journalist), American journalist and managing editor
- Monica Drake, American fiction writer
- Monica Duran (born 1960), American politician
- Mónica Echeverría (1920–2020), Chilean journalist
- Monica Edmondson (born 1963), Sami glass artist
- Monica Edwards (1912–1998), British children's author
- Monica Elfvin (born 1938), Swedish gymnast
- Monica Ell-Kanayuk, Canadian politician
- Monica Enlid (born 1973), Norwegian footballer
- Mónica Equihua (born 1982), Mexican race-walker
- Monica Esposito (1962–2011), Italian Chinese religious scholar
- Mónica Estarreado (born 1975), Spanish actress
- Monica Evans (born 1940), British actress
- Monica Faenzi (born 1965), Italian politician
- Mónica Falcioni (born 1968), Uruguayan long and triple jumper
- Monica Falkner, New Zealand netball player
- Mónica Farro (born 1976), Uruguayan model and actress
- Mónica Fechino (born 1967), Argentine windsurfer
- Mónica Fein (born 1957), Argentine politician
- Monica Felton (1906–1970), British writer, town planner, feminist and social activist
- Mónica Feria Tinta (born 1966), British/Peruvian barrister, public international law specialist
- Mónica Fernández, several people
- Mónica Ferrández (born 1974), Spanish rhythmic gymnast and trainer
- Monica Ferrell, American poet and fiction writer
- Monica Flaherty Frassetto (1920–2008), American filmmaker and archaeologist
- Monica Fletcher, British nurse
- Monica Mădălina Florea (born 1993), Romanian long-distance runner
- Mónica Flores (born 1996), Mexican footballer
- Mónica Fonseca (born 1982), Colombian-American television presenter, journalist and blogger
- Monica Di Fonzo (born 1977), Swiss footballer and manager
- Monica Forsberg (born 1950), Swedish singer, songwriter and actress
- Mónica Edith Frade, Argentine politician
- Monica Frassoni (born 1963), Italian politician
- Monica J. Freeman, African-American filmmaker
- Monica Friday, Nigerian film actress, influencer, realtor, model and producer
- Monica Furlong (1930–2003), British author, journalist, poet and women's activist
- Monica Gagliano (born 1976), Italian ecologist
- Mónica Galán (1950–2019), Argentine actress
- Monica Galetti (born 1975), Samoan-born New Zealand chef
- Monica Gallagher (1923–2013), Australian community worker
- Monica Gandhi, American physician and academic researcher
- Mónica García (born 1974), Spanish politician
- Mónica García de la Fuente (born 1980), Mexican politician and lawyer
- Monica Kim Garza, American painter
- Monica Garza, Mexican artist
- Monica Gåsvatn (born 1968), Norwegian politician
- Monica Gayle, American television news anchor
- Monica Gaylord (born 1948), Canadian pianist
- Monica Geingos (born 1976), First Lady of Namibia
- Monica De Gennaro (born 1987), Italian volleyball player
- Mónica Gerardo (born 1976), American-Mexican footballer
- Monica Germino, American Dutch musician
- Monica Gesue, American writer and illustrator
- Monica Geuze (born 1995), Dutch television presenter and former vlogger and DJ
- Monica Gill (born 1990), American model, actress and beauty pageant titleholder
- Monica Giorgi (born 1946), Italian tennis player
- Mónica Godoy (born 1976), Chilean actress
- Monica Goermann (born 1964), Canadian gymnast
- Monica Golding (1902–1997), British Army nurse and nursing administrator
- Mónica Gonçalves (born 1988), Portuguese footballer
- Mónica González, several people
- Monica Goodling (born 1973), former Director of Public Affairs for the U.S. Department of Justice
- Monica Gould (born 1957), Australian politician
- Monica Grady (born 1958), British space scientist
- Monica Green (historian), medieval historian
- Monica Green (politician) (born 1959), Swedish politician
- Monica Grefstad (born 1964), Norwegian hurdler
- Mónica de Greiff (born 1956), Colombian lawyer and former Justice Minister
- Monica Groop (born 1958), Finnish opera singer
- Monica Guerritore (born 1958), Italian actress
- Monica Gunnarsson (born 1965), Swedish race-walker
- Monica Gunning, American poet
- Mónica Gutiérrez (born 1955), Argentine journalist
- Monica Haider (born 1963), Swedish politician
- Monica Hall, English musician and writer
- Monica Haller, American photographer
- Monica Hampton, American documentary filmmaker
- Monica Hanna, Egyptian Egyptologist
- Monica Hansen (born 1982), Norwegian model
- Monica Vik Hansen (born 1973), Norwegian handball player
- Monica Harding, British politician
- Monica Hargrove (born 1982), American sprinter
- Monica Harrison (1897–1983), English mezzo-soprano
- Monica Havelka (1956–2009), American rower
- Monica Heisey, Canadian writer, screenwriter and comedian
- Monica Heldal (born 1991), Norwegian musician and songwriter
- Monica Heller (born 1955), Canadian linguist
- Monica Hellström, Danish producer and production manager
- Monica Helms (born 1951), American transgender activist and writer
- Monica Hesse, American journalist and author
- Monica Hickmann Alves (born 1987), Brazilian footballer
- Monica Beverly Hillz (born 1985), American drag performer and transgender activist
- Monica of Hippo (322–387), Numidian saint, the mother of Saint Augustine
- Monica Hitchcock (born 1958), Canadian volleyball player
- Monica Holler (born 1984), Swedish cyclist
- Monica Holmes (born 1944), Australian politician
- Monica Horan (born 1963), American actress
- Monica Howe, British costume designer
- Monica Huggett (born 1953), British musician
- Monica Hughes (1925–2003), British Canadian children's writer
- Monica Huppert, Canadian make-up artist
- Monica Iacob Ridzi (born 1977), Romanian politician
- Monica Iagăr (born 1973), Romanian high jumper
- Monica Iozzi (born 1981), Brazilian actress and reporter
- Monica Isakstuen (born 1976), Norwegian writer from Fredrikstad
- Monica C. Jackson, American statistician and academic administrator
- Monica Jackson (1920–2020), Scottish climber
- Mónica Jaramillo (born 1984), Colombian journalist, news presenter, model and former beauty pageant contestant
- Monica Jauca (born 1968), Romanian biathlete
- Mónica Jiménez (1940–2020), Chilean politician
- Monica McKelvey Johnson, American artist and activist
- Monica Johnson (1946–2010), American screenwriter
- Monica Jones, several people
- Monica Joyce (born 1958), English-Irish-American long-distance runner
- Monica Juma (born 1963), Kenyan diplomat
- Monica Justice, American-Canadian developmental geneticist
- Mônica Kabregu, Uruguayan ceramicist and painter
- Monica Karina, musical artist
- Monica Keena (born 1979), American actress
- Monica Van Kerrebroeck (1939–2023), Belgian Catholic nun and politician
- Monica Khanna (born 1986), Indian actress
- Monica Khonado (born 1996), TV presenter and Miss Earth Indonesia 2020
- Monica Kim, Canadian singer
- Monica Kimick (c. 1906–1982), British film editor
- Monica Knudsen (born 1975), Norwegian football coach
- Monica Kraft, American scientist and medical professor
- Mónica Kräuter (born 1967), Venezuelan chemist and professor
- Monica Kulling (born 1952), Canadian children's author
- Monica Kurth, American teacher and politician
- Monica Lacy (born 1970), American television and film actress
- Monica Lakhanpaul, British pediatrician
- Monica S. Lam, American computer scientist
- Monica Lamb-Powell (born 1964), American basketball player
- Monica Langley, American journalist and businesswoman
- Monica Lanz (born 1991), Dutch rower
- Monica Larner (born 1970), Italian wine critic and writer
- Mónica Lavín (born 1955), Mexican author
- Monica Lăzăruț (born 1977), Romanian cross-country skier
- Monica Lee Gradischek (born 1971), American actress
- Monica Leeuw, South African judge
- Monica Lennon (born 1981), Scottish politician
- Mónica Esmeralda León (born 1991), Mexican actress and filmmaker
- Monica Lewinsky (born 1973), American White House intern and scandal celebrity
- Monica Lewis (1922–2015), American actress and singer
- Monica Lierhaus (born 1970), German sports journalist and television host
- Monica Lindeen (born 1962), American politician
- Monica Lindfors (born 2000), Finnish figure skater
- Mónica Litza (born 1961), Argentine politician
- Mónica Liyau (born 1967), Peruvian table tennis player
- Monica Løken, Norwegian handball player
- Monica Lopera (born 1985), Colombian-American actress
- Mónica López, several people
- Monica Loughman, Irish ballet dancer and teacher
- Monica Lovinescu (1923–2008), Romanian essayist
- Monica C. Lozano (born 1956), American newspaper editor
- Monica Lundqvist (born 1967), Swedish tennis player
- Monica Lynch, musical artist
- Monica Macaulay, American linguist
- Monica MacDonald (born 1967), Australian figure skater and coach
- Mónica Macha (born 1972), Argentine politician
- Mónica Macías (born 1972), Equatoguinean author
- Monica MacIvor (1881–1939), South African painter
- Monica Macovei (born 1959), Romanian politician
- Mónica Madariaga (1942–2009), Chilean lawyer, academic and politician
- Monica Majoli (born 1963), American artist
- Monica Mæland (born 1968), Norwegian lawyer and politician
- Mónica Malavassi (born 1989), Costa Rican basketball player and former footballer
- Monica Malpass (born 1961), American journalist
- Monica Malta, social epidemiologist
- Monica Mancini (born 1952), Italian-American singer
- Monica Márquez (born 1969), American judge
- Mónica Martínez (born 1975), Spanish journalist, model and television presenter
- Monica Aissa Martinez, visual artist
- Monica Muñoz Martinez (born 1984), American historian
- Monica Marulli (born 1975), Italian volleyball player
- Monica Mason (born 1941), British ballet dancer and teacher
- Monica Mattos, Brazilian former pornographic actress, director, dancer and television
- Monica Maughan (1933–2010), Australian actress
- Monica Mya Maung (1917–2008), archivist active in Burma
- Monica Maurice (1908–1995), British industrialist
- Monica Maxwell (born 1976), American basketball player and coach
- Mónica Mayer, Mexican artist, activist and art critic
- Monica Mayhem (born 1978), Australian pornographic actress, dancer and singer
- Monica Ngezi Mbega, Tanzanian politician
- Monica McFawn (born 1979), American writer
- Monica McInerney, Australian writer
- Monica Beatrice McKenzie (1905–1988), New Zealand teacher, dietitian and public servant
- Monica McLemore, American nurse and academic researcher
- Monica McNutt, ESPN basketball analyst and former collegiate basketball player
- Monica McWilliams (born 1954), British politician and academic
- Monica Medina (born 1962), American lawyer and environmental activist
- Mónica Medina, American scientist
- Monica Mehta, American financial journalist
- Mónica Mendes (born 1993), Portuguese footballer
- Mónica Mesalles (born 1987), Spanish artistic gymnast
- Mónica Mesones, Uruguayan model
- Mónica Messa (born 1966), Spanish basketball player
- Monica Michel (born 1955), French politician
- Mónica Miguel (1936–2020), Mexican actress
- Monica Milne, first woman diplomat in the UK
- Mònica Miquel Serdà (1962–2023), Spanish politician
- Mónica de Miranda, Portuguese visual artist and researcher
- Monica Mohan, American artist
- Monica Mok (born 1981), Chinese-born Australian model and film actress
- Monica Molvær (born 1986), Norwegian politician
- Monica Mondardini (born 1960), Italian manager
- Mónica Montañés (born 1966), Venezuelan screenwriter and journalist
- Monica Montgomery Steppe, American politician
- Monica Moorehead, American political activist
- Monica Moriarty, Canadian female curler
- Monica Moss, Bolivian fashion designer
- Monica Mugenyi (born 1969), Ugandan lawyer and judge
- Monica Murnan (born 1966), American politician
- Monica Musenero, Ugandan veterinarian and epidemiologist
- Monica Musonda (born c. 1976), Zambian lawyer and entrepreneur
- Mónica Nágel Berger (born 1960), Costa Rican politician and lawyer
- Monica Naisen (died 1626), Japanese Roman Catholic martyr beatified in 1867
- Mónica Naranjo (born 1974), Spanish singer
- Monica Nashandi (born 1959), Namibian diplomat and politician
- Monica Van Nassauw (born 1968), Belgian cyclist
- Mónica Navarro (born 1968), Argentinian musical artist
- Monica Ndaya, DR Congolese footballer
- Monica von Neumann (1964–2019), American socialite
- Monica Nevins, Canadian mathematician
- Monica Niculescu (born 1987), Romanian tennis player
- Monica Nielsen, several people
- Mónica Noguera (born 1971), Mexican TV personality
- Monica Nolan (1913–1995), American tennis player
- Monica Nordquist (1941–2017), Swedish actress
- Monica Novotny, American journalist
- Monica Azuba Ntege, Ugandan politician
- Mónica Núñez (born 1976), Dominican Republic boxer
- Mónica Ocampo (born 1987), Mexican footballer
- Monica Ogah (born 1994), Nigerian singer
- Mónica Ojeda (born 1988), Ecuadorian writer
- Monica Okoye (born 1999), Japanese basketball player
- Monica Oliphant (born 1940), British-Australian academic and physicist
- Monica Olmi (born 1970), Italian swimmer
- Mónica Oltra (born 1969), Spanish politician
- Monica Olvera de la Cruz, soft-matter theorist
- Monica Ong, American visual poet
- Monica I. Orozco, American historian
- Monica Owusu-Breen, American TV producer
- Monica Padman (born 1987), American podcaster and actor
- Mónica Palacios, several people
- Mónica Palencia, Ecuadorian politician
- Monica Partridge (1915–2008), Russian and Slavonic scholar
- Mónica Pastrana (born 1989), Puerto Rican model
- Monica Patel (born 1999), Indian politician
- Mónica Patron (born 1963), Mexican sports shooter
- Monica Paulus, human rights activist from Papuan New Guinea
- Monica Jones Kaufman Pearson, American journalist
- Monica E. Peek, American physician
- Mónica Pellecer Alecio, Guatemalan archaeologist
- Monica Penders (born 1964), Australian film producer
- Mónica Pérez de las Heras (born 1965), Spanish journalist, writer and teacher
- Monica Peterson (born 1984), Canadian fencer
- Monica Petzal, British artist
- Monica Pidgeon (1913–2009), British interior designer and writer
- Monica Pimentel (born 1989), Aruban taekwondo practitioner
- Monica Pinette (born 1977), Canadian modern pentathlete
- Mónica Pinto (born 1952), Argentinian lawyer and politician
- Mónica Ponce de León (born 1965), American architect
- Mónica Pont (born 1969), Spanish long-distance runner
- Monica Poole (1921–2003), British wood engraver
- Monica Porter, Hungarian-born British journalist
- Monica Potter (born 1971), American actress
- Monica Potts, American journalist and non-fiction writer
- Claudette Monica Powell, also known as Sister Monica Clare, American nun
- Monica Prasad, American sociologist
- Monica Prieto-Teodoro (born 1966), Filipino politician
- Monica Proenca (born 1972), Brazilian dance choreographer
- Monica Puig (born 1993), Puerto Rican tennis player
- Mónica Pulgar (born 1971), Spanish basketball player
- Monica Queen, Scottish singer
- Mónica Quintela, Portuguese politician
- Mónica Quinteros (born 1988), Ecuadorian footballer
- Monica Raghwan, Fijian politician
- Monica Rahanitraniriana, Malagasy sprinter
- Mònica Ramírez (born 1993), Andorran swimmer
- Mónica Ramírez Almadani (born 1979), American judge
- Mónica Ramírez (activist), American civil rights attorney and trade unionist
- Monica Ramon (born 1978), Spanish-American actress
- Mónica Ramos (born 1998), Colombian footballer
- Mónica Randall (born 1942), Spanish film actress
- Monica Rawlins, British poster designer and activist
- Monica Raymund (born 1986), American actress
- Monica Redlich (1909–1965), English writer
- Monica Reeves (born 1972), Canadian poker player
- Mónica Regonesi (born 1961), Chilean long-distance runner
- Monica Reinach (born 1966), South African tennis player
- Monica Reinagel (born 1964), American nutritionist
- Mônica Rezende (born 1969), Brazilian swimmer
- Monica Rho, Costa Rican tennis player
- Monica Rial (born 1975), American voice actress and ADR director
- Monica Rich Kosann, American photographer
- Monica Richards, American poet
- Monica Richardson, American newspaper editor
- Mônica Riedel, First Lady of Mato Grosso do Sul (2023-present)
- Monica Riley (c. 1926–2013), American scientist
- Mónica Rincón (born 1975), Chilean journalist
- Mónica Ríos (born 1996), American-raised Puerto Rican footballer
- Monica Ritterband (born 1955), Danish artist
- Monica Robb Blasdel, American politician
- Monica Roberts (1962–2020), American writer and transgender rights advocate
- Mônica Rodrigues (born 1967), Brazilian volleyball player
- Monica Rodriguez, several people
- Monica Rogati Romania-born data scientist, computer scientist
- Monica Rokhman (born 1997), American group rhythmic gymnast
- Monica Romano, Italian activist, writer and politician
- Mónica Rosa (born 1978), Portuguese runner
- Monica Rose (1948–1994), British TV show quiz hostess
- Monica Ross (1950–2013), British artist, academic and feminist
- Monica Roșu (born 1987), Romanian artistic gymnast
- Monica Rudquist, American ceramics artist
- Mónica Rueda (born 1976), Spanish field hockey player
- Monica Rundqvist (born 1962), Swedish sports shooter
- Monica Rutherford (1944–2024), English artistic gymnast
- Monica Ruwanpathirana (1946–2004), Sri Lankan poet
- Monica Sabolo (born 1971), French writer and journalist
- Monica Sagna (born 1991), Senegalese judoka
- Monica Saili (born 1997), Samoan wrestler
- Mônica Salmaso (born 1971), Brazilian musical artist
- Mónica Sánchez (born 1970), Peruvian actress
- Monica Sandve (born 1973), Norwegian handball player
- Mónica Santa María (1972–1994), Peruvian model and TV hostess
- Monica Scattini (1956–2015), Italian actress
- Monica Scheel (born 1967), Brazilian sailor
- Mónica Schlotthauer (born 1963), Argentine union leader and politician
- Monica Sehgal (born 1990), Indian television actress
- Monica Seles (born 1973), American-Serbian tennis player
- Monica Semedo (born 1984), Luxembourgish politician
- Monica Sereda, American paracyclist
- Monica Sex, Israeli alternative rock band
- Monica Shafaq, British health advocate
- Monica Shannon (1893–1965), American writer
- Monica Sharma (born 1992), Indian model, television and film actress
- Monica Sileoni (born 1999), Finnish artistic gymnast
- Mônica da Silva, American singer-songwriter
- Mônica da Silva (volleyball) (born 1960), Brazilian volleyball player
- Monica Simpson, American reproductive rights activist
- Monica Sims (1925–2018), British radio executive
- Monica Sinclair (1925–2002), British operatic contralto
- Monica Sintra (born 1978), Portuguese singer
- Monica Sjöö (1938–2005), Swedish painter, writer and anarcho/eco-feminist
- Monica Skeete (1923–1997), Grenadian poet
- Monica L. Smith, American archaeologist and anthropologist
- Mónica Soares (born 1994), Portuguese handball player
- Monica Kristensen Solås (born 1950), Norwegian explorer
- Monica Sone (1919–2011), Japanese-American writer
- Monica Sorelle, Haitian-American filmmaker and artist
- Mônica Sousa (born 1960), executive director
- Mónica Spear (1984–2014), Venezuelan beauty pageant titleholder
- Monica Staggs (born 1970), American stuntwoman and actress
- Monica Stefani (born 1957), Italian gymnast
- Monica Stevens (born 1967), Antigua and Barbuda sprinter
- Monica Lisa Stevenson (born 1967), American gospel musician
- Monica Faith Stewart (born 1952), American politician
- Monica Stoian (born 1982), Romanian javelin thrower
- Monica Stonier (born 1976), American educator and politician
- Monica Strebel, Swiss actress
- Monica Sumra (born 1980), Indian cricketer
- Monica Svensson (born 1978), Swedish racewalker
- Monica Swinn, Belgian actress
- Monica Tabengwa, lawyer and researcher on LGBTIQ issues
- Monica Tadros, American plastic and reproductive surgeon
- Monica Tagoai, rugby player
- Monica Tap (born 1962), Canadian painter, artist and academic
- Monica Taylor (1877–1968), English biologist
- Monica Tavares, professionally known as Mo'Kalamity, roots reggae musician
- Mònica Terribas i Sala (born 1968), Spanish journalist
- Monica Theodorescu (born 1963), German equestrian
- Monica Tidwell (born 1954), American model
- Monica Toft, American international relations scholar
- Monica Törnell (born 1954), Swedish singer-songwriter
- Mónica Torres, Mexican taekwondo practitioner
- Monica Toth (born 1970), Romanian triple jumper
- Monica Tranel (born 1966), American rower, lawyer and political candidate
- Monica Trapaga, Australian entertainment presenter, jazz singer and writer
- Mónica Troadello, Argentine politician
- Monica Turner, American ecologist
- Monica Turner (ornithologist) (c. 1925–2013), English ornithologist
- Monica Twum (born 1978), Ghanaian sprinter
- Monica Ulmanu, Romanian journalist and graphics editor
- Monica Ungureanu (born 1988), Romanian judoka
- Mónica Urquiza (born 1965), Argentine politician
- Monica Valentinelli, Italian-American game designer
- Monica Vallarin (born 1965), Italian swimmer
- Monica Valvik (born 1970), Norwegian cyclist
- Monica VanDieren, American mathematician
- Mónica Vargas Celis, Mexican film and television producer
- Monica Vaughan (born 1952), British Paralympic swimmer
- Monica Verduzco-Gutierrez, American academic physiatrist
- Mónica Vergara (born 1983), Mexican footballer
- Monica Vernon (born 1957), American politician
- Monica Verschoor (born 1950), Dutch pop singer and pianist
- Monica Vikström-Jokela (born 1960), Finnish-Swedish television script writer
- Mónica Villa (born 1954), Argentine actress
- Monica Vișan (born 1979), Romanian mathematician
- Monica Vitti (1931–2022), Italian actress
- Monica Waldvogel (born 1956), Brazilian journalist
- Monica Walker (illustrator), British writer and illustrator
- Monica Walker (born 1987), American curler
- Monica P. Wallace, American politician and attorney
- Monica Ward (born 1965), Italian voice actress
- Monica Webb Hooper, American behavioral scientist and clinical psychologist
- Monica Wehby (born 1962), American physician and politician
- Mónica Weiss, Argentine illustrator, artist, writer and architect
- Monica West, American fiction writer
- Monica Wetterström (born 1956), Swedish wheelchair racer
- Monica Wichfeld (1894–1945), Danish resistance fighter
- Monica Wilson (1908–1982), South African anthropologist
- Monica Witni (1918–1982), American composer
- Monica Witt (born 1979), American defector and former airman
- Monica Wofford, American business executive
- Monica Wright (born 1988), American basketball player
- Mónica Xavier (born 1956), Uruguayan politician
- Monica Yin (born 1977), Taiwanese actress
- Monica Youn, American poet and lawyer
- Monica Youngblood, American politician
- Monica Yunus (born 1979), Bangladeshi-Russian-American opera singer
- Mónica Zalaquett (born 1962), Chilean businesswoman and politician
- Monica Zetterlund (1937–2005), Swedish singer and actress
- Mónica Zetzsche, Argentine engineer

== Fictional characters ==
- Monica in Monica's Gang
- Monica in the video game Dead or Alive Xtreme Venus Vacation
- Monica Geller in the TV series Friends
- Monica Quartermaine in the TV series General Hospital
- Monica Rambeau in Marvel Comics
- Monica Reyes in the TV series The X-Files
- Mónica Gaztambide in Money Heist

== See also ==
- Monika (given name)
- Mona (name)
- Monica (disambiguation)
