= Rawlin =

Rawlin is a surname. Notable people with the surname include:

- Andrew Rawlin (born 1960), British cross-country skier
- Eric Rawlin (1897–1943), English cricketer
- John Rawlin (1856–1924), English cricketer

== Given name ==
- Rawlin Mallock (c.1649–1691), English politician

== See also ==
- Rawlins (surname)
