= Buonfiglio =

Buonfiglio is an Italian surname. Notable people with the surname include:

- Giuseppe Buonfiglio (1547–1622), Italian soldier and historian
- Luciano Buonfiglio (born 1950), Italian sprint canoeist
- Monica Buonfiglio, Brazilian writer
- Paolo Buonfiglio (born 1995), Italian rugby union player

== See also ==
- Bonfiglio
