= Vic DiBitetto =

American stand-up comedian

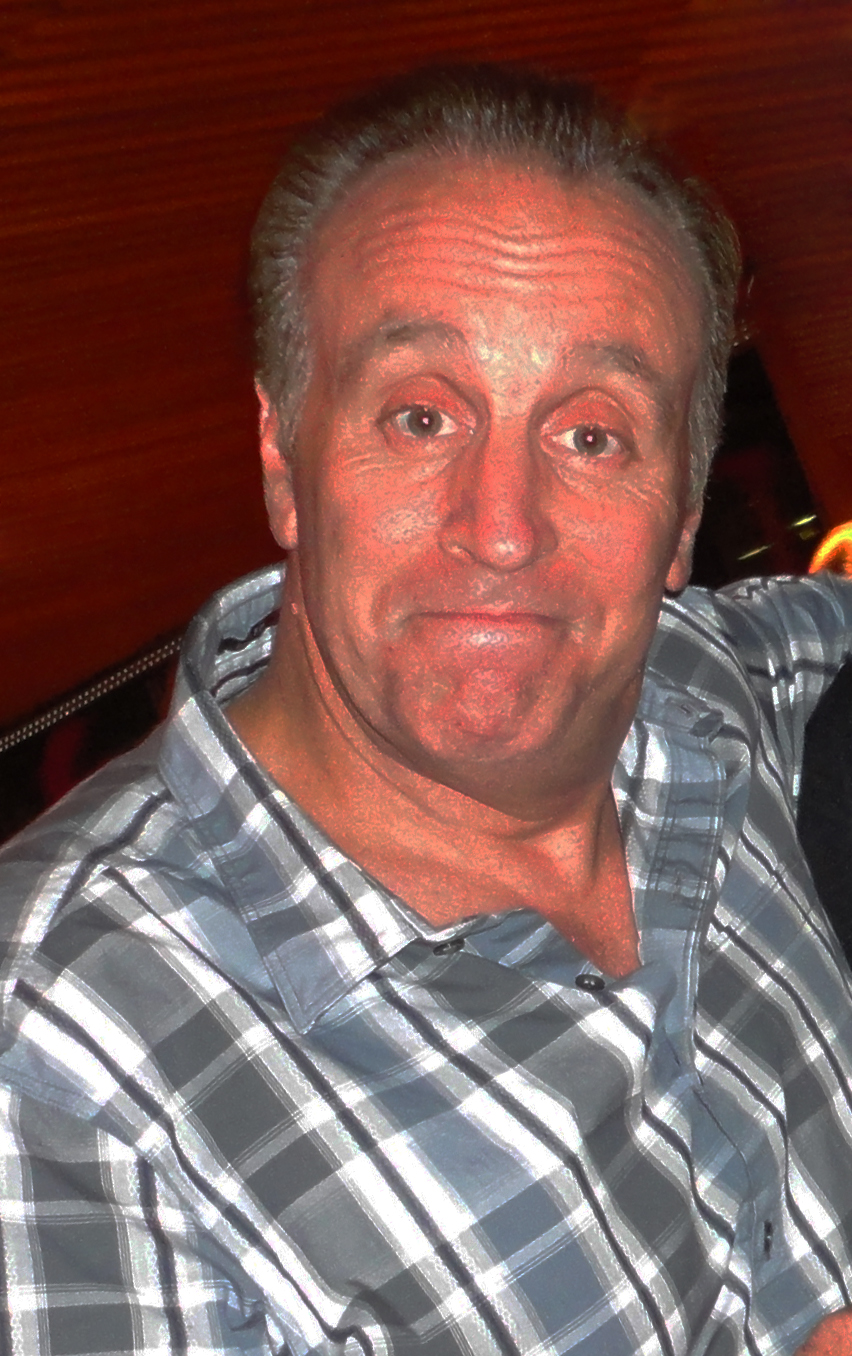
- DiBitetto in 2014
- Born: Victor Robert DiBitetto; February 9, 1961 (age 65); Brooklyn, New York, U.S.
- Notable work: YouTube, Paul Blart: Mall Cop 2, Ticked Off Vic
- Spouse: Lucy Florio (m. 1983)
- Children: 2

Comedy career
- Years active: 1981-present
- Medium: Stand-up comedy, sketch comedy
- Genre: Observational comedy
- Website: Official website

Victor Robert DiBitetto (born February 9, 1961) is an American stand-up comedian, Internet personality and actor. He often refers to himself as "The Donkey of Comedy" or "The Working Class Zero". DiBitetto is known for his YouTube videos, most notably his "Ticked Off Vic", "Bread and Milk", “Who Wants Coffee", and “How long do I gotta wait?” videos, and for portraying Gino Chizetti in the 2015 comedy film Paul Blart: Mall Cop 2.

DiBitetto was expected to appear in a Hulu sitcom named Don't Know Jack, but no further updates about the project have been announced since 2015.

== Life and career ==
DiBitetto was born on February 9, 1961, in Brooklyn, New York. He is of Italian descent. He started doing stand-up in 1981 at Pips Comedy Club, which was located in Sheepshead Bay, Brooklyn.

In 1991, DiBitetto made his first television appearance on America's Funniest People with his son, Michael, and was the $10,000 Grand Prize Winner for their home video of a mock ventriloquist act.

In February 2013, in response to the February 2013 nor'easter, DiBitetto created a YouTube video entitled "Bread and Milk", which received over 17 million views. The video has since then been shown on The View, CNN, The Today Show, and local weather channels. DiBitetto has claimed that this video, along with his internet following, is what eventually got him his stardom in show business, stating that "thirty seconds of stupidity brought [him] more recognition than thirty years of stand-up."

The following year, DiBitetto received a phone call from Kevin James, who had personally asked him to appear in a minor role in Paul Blart: Mall Cop 2 (2015). James had told Dibitetto that he was so impressed by his YouTube videos that he created the "Mall Cop" character, Gino Chizetti, based on Tony Gaga, a recurring character in Dibitetto's videos.

Along with his "Bread and Milk" video, other notable videos that went viral created by DiBitetto include a rant about not wanting to "Drive To Florida"; a reaction to Justin Bieber's 2014 arrest; an encounter with a creepy clown that was seen walking around Staten Island, New York; and a rant about Kanye West's behavior on the 2015 Grammy Awards. DiBitetto also has a mini-web series on his YouTube channel entitled "The Shed". The series takes place in his backyard and involves the construction of a shed that Dibitetto bought from Sam's Club, and the adventures that follow it after the shed is finished being built.

Prior to achieving notoriety with his internet videos and tri-state stand-up tour, DiBitetto worked as a school bus driver for Pioneer Transportation in Staten Island, New York. However, he has since then quit his bus driver job and became a stand-up comedian as a full-time occupation.

Throughout DiBitetto's previous and recent stand-up tours, he has been selling out nearly every venue where he has made an appearance. He has performed at several notable venues such as Gotham Comedy Club, The Paramount Theatre, The Borgata, Governor's Comedy Club, Mohegan Sun, Parx Casino, Las Vegas' Riviera Hotel and Casino, Los Angeles' Laugh Factory, and the 3000-seat NYCB Theatre at Westbury.

On April 7, 2015, DiBitetto appeared alongside Monica Reinagel on The Dr. Oz Show for a segment that discussed the nutrition of having milk within the average diet.

In 2018, DiBitetto starred in his second feature role, a comedy/fantasy "Abnormal Attraction" produced by Fuzz on the Lens Productions.

== Personal life ==
DiBitetto resides in Manalapan Township, New Jersey, with his wife Lucy (née Florio). He also purchased a home in Glasgow, Scotland in 2022. He is a fan of The Beatles, Kiss, Freddie Mercury, The New York Yankees, Glasgow Celtic, and the New York Giants. While growing up, his comedic idols were Red Skelton, The Three Stooges, Abbott & Costello, Richard Jeni, and George Carlin. His current goal for his career is to perform his stand-up act on The Tonight Show Starring Jimmy Fallon. In 2013, Dibitetto's son, Michael, came out as gay.

== Filmography ==
Year	Film	Role	Notes
2010	Heart and Soul	Vic Hooper	Short film
2014	Covering the Spread	Doctor	Short film
2014	Tom and Gerry	Vinnie	Short film
2015	Paul Blart: Mall Cop 2	Gino Chizetti	
2018	Abnormal Attractions	Sheriff Ed Moore	
2018	Who's Jenna...?	Steve Bower	
2019	Turkey's Done	Tony DeLuca	Short film
2021	Gravesend	Barry	Amazon Prime series
