= FreakNet =

Hackerspace in Catania, Italy

FreakNet is a Hacklab and hackerspace active in Catania since 1995, the first opened in Italy.

The center curates and develops the Museum of Functioning Informatics of Palazzolo Acreide, where almost two thousand historical computers are not only exhibited, but also turned on and available for use by the public, both directly and remotely, via the Internet.

More generally, FreakNet offers free IT services, software programs and IT training courses, and also organizes and hosts cultural and artistic events not strictly related to IT.

== History ==
The birth of FreakNet dates back to the years of the BBS. It presented itself as an alternative BBS network, detached from the FIDONET world circuit, similar to networks such as CYBERNET and ECN . In those years the collaboration with the historic anti-mafia magazine I Siciliani (founded by Giuseppe Fava ) was born spontaneously : the newspaper became the first to use telematic tools for the transmission of services and pieces and for the dissemination of the computer version of the same magazine. The BBS FreakNet network therefore offered the community the opportunity to report mafia events, abuses and the opportunity to "inform" from below.

In 1995 Gabriele Zaverio (also known as Asbesto Molesto) decided to set up a place to experiment with open information technologies and obtained a space on the first floor of the AURO Social Center in Catania, which became the first physical location of the FreakNet.

Various activities are born: basic IT courses open to citizens and non-EU citizens, accounts on Unix systems with e- mail addresses; circulation of antiprohibitionist software (such as High Grow ); collaborations with one of the first editions of "Libera-Mente, Contro la Mafia" organized by the Libera Association; exhibitions, shows, events and various information campaigns (for example, against the death penalty and in favor of free software). Noteworthy are the recovery and cataloging works of the historical newspaper library of the Auro Social Center, which collects complete collections of newspapers from the 1930suntil the end of the sixties, as well as the first digitization works of historical works of Southern Italy, such as the volumes Historia di Sicilia and Messina noble city by Giuseppe Buonfiglio (edition of 1738 ) the volume Historia di Sicilia ( De Rebus Siculis ) by Tommaso Fazello (edition of 1628 ), and the eighteenth-century volumes Of the compendium of the Historia of the Kingdom of Naples by Mambrin Roseo da Fabriano and Delle Historie Memorabili de his times by Alessandro Ziliolo, as well as a "Campaign for conscientious objection to the use of closed software in universities" in March 2000.

During the first years of its existence, due to its sometimes provocative social activities and its political color, the FreakNet is often attacked by the authorities, who come to ask for its eviction; this request is however declared illegitimate and the sentence opens up a long history of legal appeals not yet concluded. During the same period, the center and its members are subjected to acts of vandalism, intimidation and some occupants suffer personal injuries, which will be attributed to members of the far right . Subsequently, the Catania center moved, and is currently hosted at the Arci headquarters in Catania, while branch offices are established in Palazzolo Acreide and in Canterbury.

Currently the FreakNet has more than 500 registered users, many of whom connect from various parts of the world.

== Museum of Working Informatics ==
One of the most important projects of the FreakNet is the Museum of Functioning Informatics (MusIF), the result of the collaboration of the association with Dyne, the group of free software programmers responsible for the Linux distribution dyne: bolic, and the Poetry Hacklab, a free computer lab of Palazzolo Acreide, a town in the Syracuse area.

The idea is not only to recover and classify historical machines, with their software and all available documentation, and to make this archive, including photographic ones, available via the Internet; but above all to repair the machines to make them functional and, as far as possible, usable by visitors, even remotely.

Among the nearly two thousand computers so far in the collection, there are historical minicomputers like the PDP-11 of the DEC, the Data General Eclipse, the IBM RS/6000, the DPS-6 of Honeywell, or different systems Apple like the Apple I.

While waiting for a larger site, currently most of the nearly two thousand machines are kept in the premises of the Poetry HackLab in Palazzolo Acreide; some of them can be used via the internet through the links on the Poetry laboratory web pages.

== Bibliography ==
- Gabriele "Asbesto Molesto" Zaverio, Who we are, What we do, Where are we going, and Why? . In BFi13-dev, file 07, Butchered From Inside, 20 August 2004. Historical / autobiographical account of the birth of the hacklab.
