= América Noticias (Argentina) =

Argentine TV news program

América Noticias is an Argentine TV news program. It is hosted by Mónica Gutiérrez and Guillermo Andino.

== Awards ==
=== Nominations ===
- 2013 Martín Fierro Awards
  - Best TV news program
