= Arthur Pardee =

American biochemist (1921–2019)

Arthur Beck Pardee
- Born: July 13, 1921
- Died: February 24, 2019 (aged 97)
- Education: Bachelor of Science degree from the University of California, Berkeley (1942); Master's degree from California Institute of Technology (1943); PhD degree from California Institute of Technology (1947)
- Known for: PaJaMo Experiment
- Awards: Pfizer Award in Enzyme Chemistry (1960); Sir Hans Krebs Medal (1973); Rosenstiel Award (1974)
- Scientific career
- Fields: Molecular biology
- Workplaces: Dana–Farber Cancer Institute; Harvard Medical School

Arthur Beck Pardee (July 13, 1921 – February 24, 2019) was an American biochemist. One biographical portrait begins "Among the titans of science, Arthur Pardee is especially intriguing." There is hardly a field of molecular biology that is not affected by his work, which has advanced our understanding through theoretical predictions followed by insightful experiments. He is perhaps most famous for his part in the 'PaJaMo experiment' of the late 1950s, which greatly helped in the discovery of messenger RNA. He is also well known as the discoverer of the restriction point, in which a cell commits itself to certain cell cycle events during the G1 cycle. He did a great deal of work on tumor growth and regulation, with a particular focus on the role of estrogen in hormone-responsive tumors. He is also well known for the development of various biochemical research techniques, most notably the differential display methodology, which is used in examining the activation of genes in cells. More recently he championed the acceptance and adoption of the conceptual review as a valuable approach to unearthing new knowledge from the enormous stores of information in the scientific literature. He died in February 2019 at the age of 97.

== Career ==
Pardee received his Bachelor of Science degree from the University of California, Berkeley in 1942 while his Master's (1943) and PhD (1947) degrees were earned at the California Institute of Technology under the mentorship of Linus Pauling, whom he considered to be the greatest chemist of the 20th century. Pardee did postdoctoral work at the University of Wisconsin–Madison before returning to Berkeley as an instructor in biochemistry in 1949. In the 1950s, he was on a sabbatical with Francois Jacob and Jacques Monod in Paris. In 1961 Pardee became professor in biochemical sciences at Princeton University while in 1975 he moved to Boston to become professor of biological chemistry and molecular pharmacology at the Dana–Farber Cancer Institute and Harvard Medical School as well as chief for the division of cell growth and regulation at the Dana–Farber Cancer Institute. In 1981, Pardee became a founding member of the World Cultural Council. Pardee became an emeritus professor at Dana-Farber in 1992. He became a member of the American Academy of Arts and Sciences in 1936, the National Academy of Sciences in 1968, and the American Philosophical Society in 2001.

== PaJaMo ==
While on sabbatical in Paris with Jacob and Monod, Pardee was involved in an experiment that became known as PaJaMo. The PaJaMo experiment, and later work with his student Monica Riley showed that protein synthesis from a gene could begin almost as soon as the gene entered an E.coli cell. Prior hypotheses around the translation of genetic information into proteins had focused on ribosomes, which turned over too slowly to enable the rapid synthesis seen in PaJaMo. On 15 April 1960, Jacob discussed the PaJaMo experiment's findings with Sydney Brenner and Francis Crick at King's College, Cambridge. This caused Brenner and Crick to formulate on the spot the hypothesis that yet another RNA species existed, messenger RNA.

== Feedback Inhibition ==
With his student Richard Yates, Pardee discovered that biosynthesis of pyrimidine in Escherichia coli is subject to feedback inhibition. This represented an important step in understanding metabolic regulation. Feedback inhibition in glycolysis had been reported by Zacharias Dische in an almost unknown paper a decade earlier.

== The restriction point ==
In the early 1970s Pardee identified that the cell cycle has a point in the 'G1 phase' where the cell, as it were, 'commits' to moving to the 'S phase'. Pardee published on this so-called 'restriction point', sometimes called the 'Pardee point', in 1974.

== Students ==
Pardee's students included Allan Wilson, who gained his PhD at Berkeley under Pardee's supervision in 1961. Monica Riley was also a Ph.D. student with Pardee and contributed to his studies of mRNA.
