= Monica Malta =

Social Epidemiologist

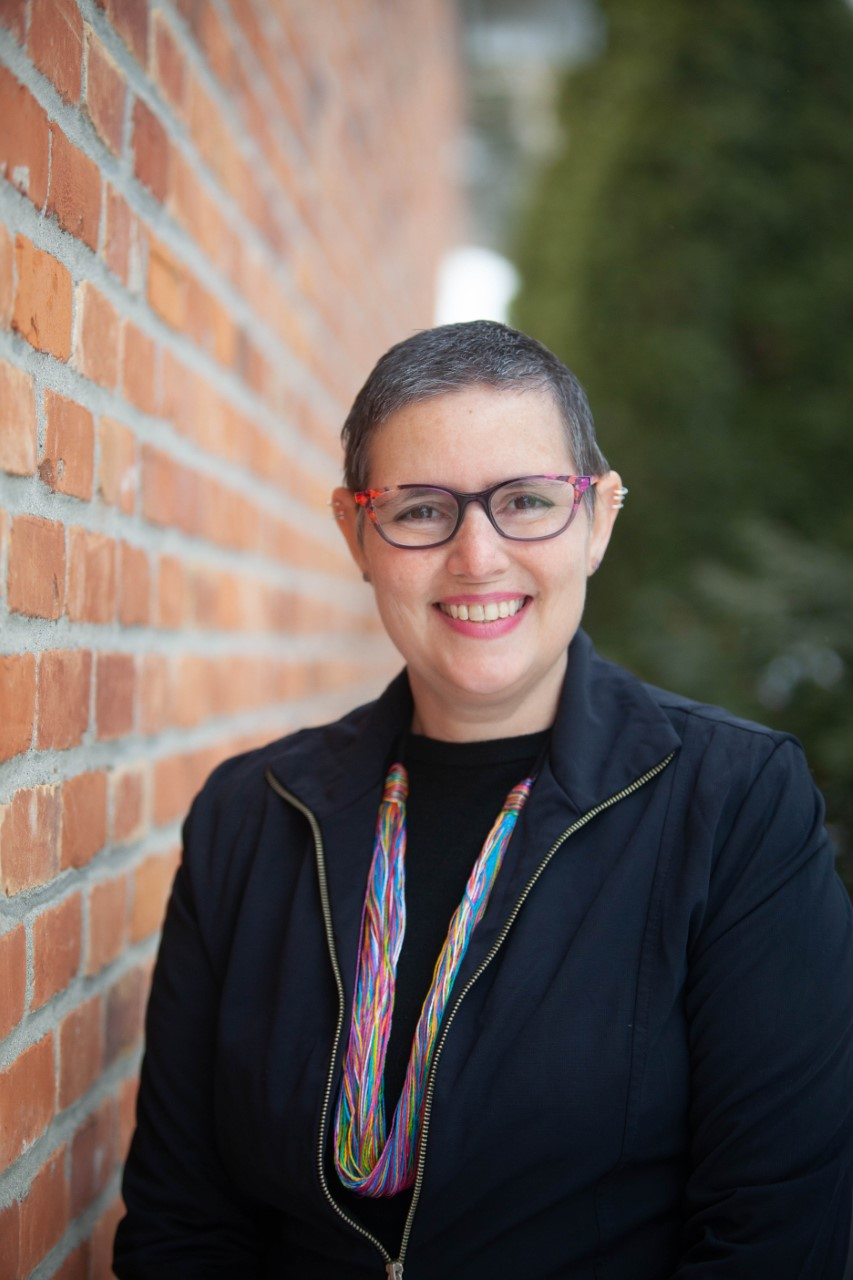
- Malta in 2022
- Born: September 20, 1970 (age 55); Brazil
- Education: Johns Hopkins Bloomberg School of Public Health
- Scientific career
- Fields: Social Epidemiology
- Workplaces: Johns Hopkins University; University of Toronto

Monica Malta is a Brazilian researcher who works mostly to address health inequalities faced by LGBTQ persons. She is currently a professor at the University of Toronto and a scientist at the Centre for Addiction and Mental Health. She was elected a TED fellow in 2022.

== Early life and education ==
Malta was born in Brazil. As a young woman she was part of an abusive relationship, but was able to complete her studies at night. Her undergraduate studies at the Rio de Janeiro State University focused on social psychology, when she worked to improve the available treatments for people who use drugs living in slums/favelas from Rio de Janeiro. She completed both her Masters of Public Health and doctoral research at the National School of Public Health Sérgio Arouca. During her graduate studies she worked and studied to improve the lives of people living with HIV/AIDS, and Brazilian women living in deep poverty and experiencing violence.

She was awarded a National Institutes of Health award and moved to the United States, continuing her studies at the Johns Hopkins Bloomberg School of Public Health. Malta received several international awards from National Institute on Drug Abuse, the World Health Organization, among others At the time she had two young daughters, studying during the day and working as a dishwasher at nigh to support them. Malta started a postdoctoral research in epidemiology at the Johns Hopkins University, focusing her studies in human rights violations.

== Research and career ==
Malta studies the societal structures that impact the adoption of public health behavior. She has particularly looked at the mental health and HIV diagnoses of people from marginalized groups. She has focused on developing resources for LGBTQ+ people. Amongst the resources she has created, she launched an app that provided information on safe spaces in Brazil for LGBTQ+ people.

During the COVID-19 pandemic, Malta switched her research focus to the emerging coronavirus. She was diagnosed with the virus in May 2020, and went on to suffer from Long COVID. Her research focused on how South America responded to the pandemic. The region suffers from slow vaccination rates, social inequality and underfunded health systems. She was awarded the Canadian Partnership for Women and Children's Health (CanWaCH) Award for Canadian Excellence in Global Health and Gender Equality in 2020, and was a 2021 Women of Inspiration Finalist. She went on to investigate the mental health experiences of healthcare providers who were treating patients with COVID-19.

Malta was elected a TED fellow in 2022. Her fellowship advocated for human rights and the development of resources to mitigate the impacts of gender-based violence. She is currently serving on the leadership team of 500 Women Scientists.

== Selected publications ==
- Monica Malta; Leticia Oliveira Cardoso; Francisco Inacio Bastos; Monica Maria Ferreira Magnanini; Cosme Marcelo Furtado Passos da Silva (1 June 2010). "STROBE initiative: guidelines on reporting observational studies". Revista de Saúde Pública. 44 (3): 559–565. doi:10.1590/s0034-89102010000300021. ISSN 0034-8910. PMID 20549022. Wikidata Q84407829.
- Monica Malta; Steffanie A Strathdee; Monica M F Magnanini; Francisco I Bastos (1 August 2008). "Adherence to antiretroviral therapy for human immunodeficiency virus/acquired immune deficiency syndrome among drug users: a systematic review". Addiction. 103 (8): 1242–1257. doi:10.1111/j.1360-0443.2008.02269.x. ISSN 0965-2140. PMID 18855813. Wikidata Q22242638.
- Monica Malta; Monica M F Magnanini; Steffanie A Strathdee; Francisco I Bastos (20 November 2008). "Adherence to antiretroviral therapy among HIV-infected drug users: a meta-analysis". AIDS and Behavior. 14 (4): 731–747. doi:10.1007/s10461-008-9489-7. ISSN 1090-7165. PMID 19020970. Wikidata Q37330136.
