= Rawlins (surname) =

Rawlins is a surname. Notable people with the surname include:

- Adrian Rawlins, British actor
- Andrew Rawlins, Rhodesian army officer
- Chip Rawlins, writer
- Delray Rawlins, Bermudian and Sussex cricketer
- Dennis Rawlins, American astronomer, historian, and publisher
- Horace Rawlins, English professional golfer
- John Aaron Rawlins, American Civil War general
- Joseph Lafayette Rawlins, American politician and lawyer
- Michael Rawlins, chairman of UK's Medicines and Healthcare Products Regulatory Agency
- Monica Rawlins, British artist
- Nicholas Rawlins, British experimental psychologist
- Pat Rawlings, American technical illustrator and space artist
- Richard Rawlins, bishop of St. Davids
- Rondell Rawlins, Guyanese gang leader
- V. Lane Rawlins, president of Washington State University
- Xander Rawlins, British singer-songwriter, 1000 Miles Apart

== Fictional ==
- Ezekial "Easy" Rawlins, private investigator in novels by Walter Mosley
