= Bonfiglio =

Bonfiglio is an Italian surname. Notable people with the surname include:

- Óscar Bonfiglio (1905–1987), Mexican football player
- Pascual Bonfiglio (1907–?), Argentine boxer
- Robert Bonfiglio (born 1950), American harmonica player
- Stefano Bonfiglio (born 1964), Italian businessman
- Susanna Bonfiglio (born 1974), Italian basketball player

== See also ==
- Buonfiglio
