= Center for Innovative Phage Applications and Therapeutics =

Phage therapy center in San Diego, CA, US

Center for Innovative Phage Applications and Therapeutics (IPATH)
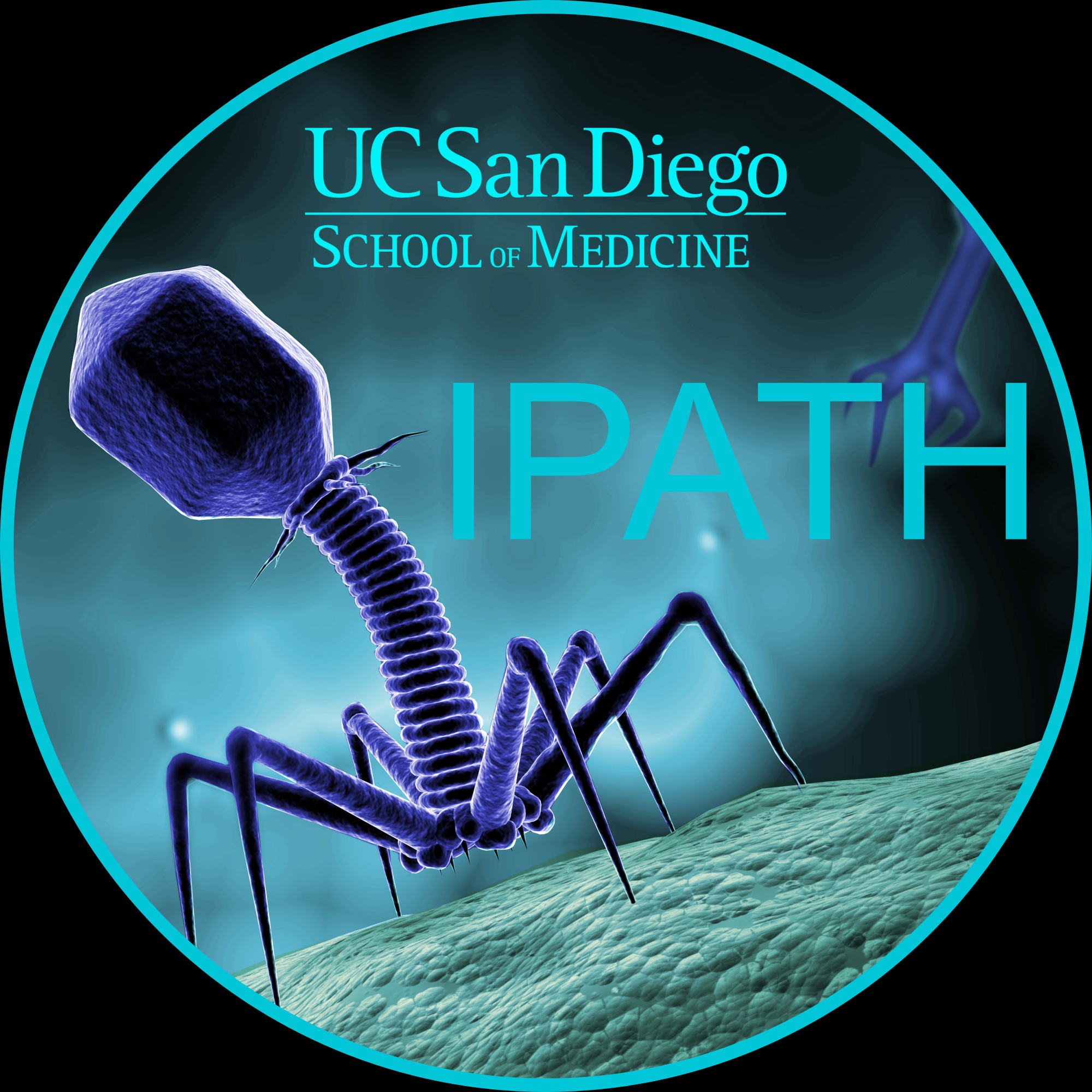
- Founded: June 21, 2018; 8 years ago
- Purpose: Phage therapy
- Location: La Jolla, California
- Co-Director: Steffanie A. Strathdee, Ph.D.
- Co-Director: Robert T. Schooley M.D.
- Website: ipath.ucsd.edu

The Center for Innovative Phage Applications and Therapeutics (IPATH) is the first phage therapy center in North America, founded at the UC San Diego School of Medicine in June 2018, with seed funding from UC San Diego chancellor Pradeep Khosla. The center was founded by Steffanie A. Strathdee and Robert "Chip" Schooley, both professors at the UC San Diego School of Medicine. The center currently treats patients with life-threatening multi-drug resistant infections with phage therapy, on a case-by-case basis, through the Food and Drug Administration's (FDA) compassionate use program. IPATH aims to initiate phase I/II phage therapy clinical trials, focusing on patients with cystic fibrosis and infections related to implantable hardware, such as pacemakers and prosthetic joints. The first planned clinical trial is set to look at otherwise healthy cystic fibrosis patients that are shedding Pseudomonas aeruginosa.

== Phage therapy ==
Phage therapy is the method by which bacteriophages (viruses which infect bacteria) are used to treat bacterial infections or reduce bacterial populations. Phage therapy has gained recent attention in the United States as an alternative to standard antibiotic therapy. It has been in practice for just over 100 years in countries such as Russia and Georgia, but due to the recent clinical attention of antibiotic resistance, Western countries have slowly been integrating phage therapy into their medicinal arsenal. Currently, in the United States, phages are used for treating bacterial infections only when patients have multi-drug resistant (MDR) life-threatening infections, or when patients are immunocompromised and antibiotic therapy is not a viable option. To date, the majority of phage therapy in the United States has been administered intravenously (IV), by utilizing the Emergency Investigational New Drug (eIND) process which is regulated by the FDA.

== Phage therapy at UC San Diego School of Medicine ==
Tom Patterson was the first patient to be treated with phage therapy at a UC San Diego hospital in March 2016. Patterson had a systemic Acinetobacter baumannii infection that manifested while he was on vacation with his wife, Steffanie Strathdee, in Egypt. Strathdee advocated and connected with phage researchers around the United States and secured the help of friend and fellow UC San Diego professor, Robert "Chip" Schooley, who was head of the Division of Infectious Disease at the UC San Diego School of Medicine at the time. Researchers from Texas A&M University, Adaptive Phage Therapeutics, the US Navy, and San Diego State University, worked to source and purify phage that could be used to treat Patterson's infection intravenously. The FDA gave their approval for Patterson's phage therapy, through the eIND mechanism. After eight weeks of phage therapy, in conjunction with 12 weeks of antibiotics, no evidence of Acinetobacter baumannii was found in Patterson's body following June 6, 2016.

After positive media attention from Patterson's phage therapy, Schooley and Strathdee began to receive phage therapy requests from around the globe. They were involved in the treatment of five other phage therapy patients at UC San Diego School of Medicine and consulted on numerous cases throughout the United States and Europe, before officially establishing IPATH in June 2018.

== Future of IPATH ==
Since establishing in 2018, IPATH has been led by Co-directors Strathdee and Schooley, and have set out to lay the foundation for an academic center on the forefront of translational phage therapy research. Schooley and Strathdee bring with them numerous years of research experience and experience in designing clinical trials, which they are utilizing to initiate the first phage therapy clinical trials at UC San Diego School of Medicine. IPATH clinical trials will be housed at UC San Diego's AntiViral Research Center, which has been conducting clinical trials since 1986. Initial clinical trials are planned to focus on multi-drug resistant infections associated with cystic fibrosis and implantable devices.
