= Mónica López =

Mónica López may refer to:

- Mónica López (actress) (born 1969), Spanish actress
- Mònica López (born 1975), Spanish meteorologist
- Mónica López (politician), Argentine politician
- Mónica Andrea López Hidalgo, Mexican scientist
