= Robert T. Schooley =

American infectious disease physician

Robert "Chip" T. Schooley
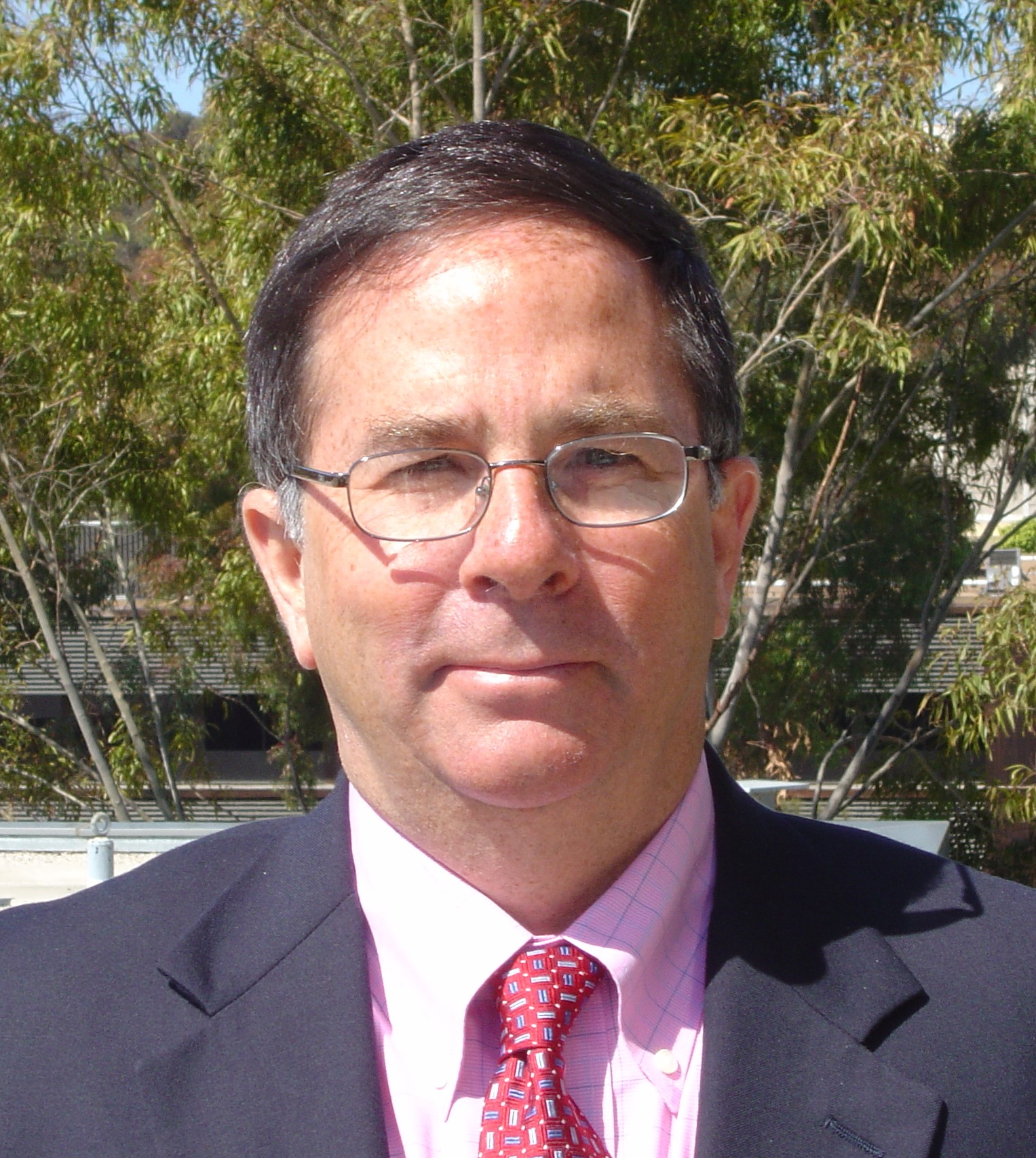
- Born: November 10, 1949 (age 76)
- Education: Johns Hopkins University School of Medicine
- Scientific career
- Workplaces: UC San Diego School of Medicine University of Colorado Harvard Medical School

Robert "Chip" T. Schooley (born November 10, 1949) is an American infectious disease physician and a Distinguished Professor at the University of California San Diego. He serves as Co-Director at the Center for Innovative Phage Applications and Therapeutics (IPATH), at the University of California San Diego School of Medicine. He is an expert in HIV and hepatitis C (HCV) infection and treatment, and in 2016, was the first physician to treat a patient in the United States with intravenous bacteriophage therapy for a systemic bacterial infection.

== Career ==
=== Early career ===
After graduating from the Johns Hopkins University School of Medicine in 1974, Schooley pursued fellowships in infectious disease at the Massachusetts General Hospital and the National Institute of Allergy and Infectious Diseases. He then focused his research on immunopathogenesis of herpesvirus infections in immunocompromised patients. In 1981, Schooley joined the faculty at Harvard Medical School as an associate professor, where he also shifted his research focus to HIV/AIDS. At this time, the first AIDS cases were identified in Boston. Schooley's research group in Boston, was one of the first groups to describe the humoral and cellular immune responses to HIV infection and he became heavily involved in the field of antiretroviral chemotherapy.

=== HIV research ===
In 1990, Schooley was recruited as the head of the Division of Infectious Diseases for the Health Sciences Center at the University of Colorado, and director of the Colorado Center for AIDS Research. While at Colorado, he served as the Chair of the NIAID's AIDS Clinical Trials Group (ACTG) which he headed from 1995 to 2002. At this time, ACTG had an annual budget of over $100 million USD. During his time as Group Chair, the ACTG expanded to include global research sites throughout Latin America, the Caribbean, South Asia and Africa, and is now the largest and most productive multinational clinical and translational research group focusing on the pathogenesis and therapy of HIV and its complications.

In 2005, he was recruited to the University of California San Diego School of Medicine, where he was the Head of the Division of Infectious Disease until 2017, and currently serves as the Vice Chair of Academic Affairs in the Department of Medicine, Senior Director of International Initiatives, and Co-Director of the Center for Innovative Phage Applications and Therapeutics.

=== Experience with phage therapy ===
In 2016, while serving as the Head of the Division of Infectious Diseases at the UC San Diego School of Medicine, Schooley was approached by his colleague, Steffanie A. Strathdee, to help save her husband's life by using bacteriophages (phages). Strathdee's husband, Tom Patterson, was suffering from a life-threatening multi-drug resistant Acinetobacter baumannii infection, that he had acquired while on vacation in Egypt. Schooley, acting as the primary infectious disease physician, along with Strathdee and a team of researchers and physicians from Texas A&M University, Adaptive Phage Therapeutics, the US Navy, UC San Diego School of Medicine, and San Diego State University, worked together to source, purify and administer phages that were active against the strain of bacteria with which Patterson was infected. Schooley was responsible for successfully navigating the Food and Drug Administration's emergency investigational new drug process, to obtain approval to administer the experimental therapy. After multiple phage cocktail administrations, provided from the partnering laboratories and companies, Patterson was cured of his infection and eventually made a full recovery. Schooley has since published a case report on his experience in treating Patterson with phage therapy, and there has been a large media coverage of the story as well. Since treating Patterson in 2016, Schooley has since been involved with the treatment of six other phage therapy patients at UC San Diego, and as well as consulting on a number of other phage therapy cases throughout the United States, Canada, Europe and Israel. In June 2018, Schooley and Strathdee were awarded a $1.2 million grant from UC San Diego Chancellor Pradeep Khosla, to help launch the Innovative Center for Phage Applications and Therapeutics (IPATH), the first phage therapy center in the United States. The goal of this center is to conduct rigorous phage therapy clinical trials, that will one day lead the Food and Drug Administration to making phage therapy more widely available.
