= Mónico =

Mónico is a masculine given name. It is a Spanish male form of Monica.

== People with the name ==
- Monico Puentevella (born 1946), Filipino politician
- Mónico Sánchez Moreno (1880-1961), Spanish electrical engineer, inventor and industrialist
