= Monica Bello =

Monica Bello may refer to:

- Monica Bello (basketball) (born 1978), Australian-Italian basketball player
- Monica Bello (art historian) (born 1973), Spanish art curator for CERN
