= Monica Berg =

Norwegian bartender

Monica Berg is a Norwegian bartender, liquor company owner, and digital innovator in London. She is originally from Norway. She received the Linie Honorary Award for her contributions to Norwegian food and drink culture in 2015 and in 2019 received the Altos Bartenders' Bartender Award at The World's 50 Best Bars, making her the first woman to be given the award.

She co-owns the bar Tayēr + Elementary in London with her partner Alex Kratena. Berg has her own liqueur line, Muyu, co-founded the nonprofit P(our), and co-created Back of House, a digital platform used by hospitality workers to anonymously report discrimination, harassment, and other issues.

== Early life and education ==
Monica Berg is originally from Oslo, Norway. As a child, her family took her hunting, fishing and mushroom hunting, experiences that would influence her bartending style. She started working in hospitality when she was 15. It is in Oslo where she began bartending. She attended H.Butlers Bartending School.

== Career ==
After completing H. Butlers Bartending School, she bought and operated the school. By 2012, Berg was working at Aqua Vitae, in Oslo, as a bartender. That is where she met award-winning bartender Alex Kratena, who would eventually become her partner. In 2013, she relocated to London and served as head bartender at Pollen Street Social in London, followed by a bartending at Himkok in Oslo. That same year, she represented Norway in the World Class Bartender of the Year final.

Berg was awarded the Linie Honorary Award for her contributions to Norwegian food and drink culture in 2015. In 2016, Berg co-founded P(our), a nonprofit symposium focused on bartending culture, with Kratena. She was featured in Where Bartenders Drink published by Phaidon in 2017.

Berg and her partner Alex Kratena opened Tayēr + Elementary in London in 2019. That same year, she received the Altos Bartenders' Bartender Award at the World's 50 Best Bars. In 2022 Tayēr + Elementary placed second in the World's 50 Best Bars. In 2019, she also co-launched Back of House, a digital platform for hospitality workers to safely and anonymous report workplace harassment, discrimination, and other problems.

In May 2022, Berg was named Creative Director of the Campari Academy.

== Style, cocktails and influences ==
Berg's cocktails often center around fresh, seasonal ingredients. Berg works with local farmers in the United Kingdom to source ingredients for cocktails. At Tayēr + Elementary, Berg works in what she describes a "collective effort" with other staff members to create cocktails, instead of each bartender creating their own individual drinks. Berg also wants to make accessible cocktails, using a test called "Would you serve this to your mother?" to decide if the beverage should make the Tayēr + Elementary menu.
