= Eric Rawlin =

English cricketer

Eric Raymond Rawlin (4 October 1897 – 11 January 1943) was an English first-class cricketer, who played eight matches for Yorkshire County Cricket Club between 1927 and 1936.

Born in Rotherham, Yorkshire, England, Rawlin was a right arm fast medium bowler, who took 21 wickets at 23.71, with a best of 3 for 28 against Lancashire in a Roses Match. Batting left-handed, he scored 72 runs at 8.00, with a best of 35 against Sussex.

Rawlin died in Rotherham, January 1943, aged 45.

His father, John Rawlin, played 315 matches for Yorkshire, Middlesex and the Marylebone Cricket Club (MCC).
