= Monica Riley =

American scientist (1926–2013)

- Born: 1926
- Died: October 11, 2013 (aged 86–87); Richmond, California
- Citizenship: American
- Education: Smith College, University of California Berkeley
- Known for: Messenger RNA, Escherichia coli genome
- Scientific career
- Workplaces: University of California Davis, Stony Brook University, Marine Biological Laboratory in Woods Hole
- Thesis: Selective destruction of genetic material and its effect on ¹-galactosidase synthesis in Escherichia coli (1960)

Monica Riley (1926 – October 11, 2013) was an American scientist who contributed to the discovery of messenger RNA in her Ph.D work with Arthur Pardee, and was later a pioneer in the exploration and computer representation of the Escherichia coli genome.

== Career ==
After graduating from Smith College with a chemistry degree in 1947, she studied Biochemistry at University of California Berkeley with Pardee. Her Ph.D. work, together with the PaJaMo experiment, ruled out ribosomes as carriers of information to synthesize protein, leading to the discovery of messenger RNA. After holding faculty positions at University of California Davis and Stony Brook University, she moved to the Marine Biological Laboratory in Woods Hole, staying there until age 80.

As a senior scientist at MBL she was one of the four founding faculty members of the Josephine Bay Paul Center for Comparative Molecular Biology and Evolution led by Mitchell Sogin. During this time, she co-founded the EcoCyc database of Escherichia coli metabolism, leading the curation of metabolic pathways and genome information for Escherichia coli for over a decade, and developed classification systems for genes and proteins (including MultiFun), which were forerunners of gene ontology.

== Selected publications ==
- Blattner, F. R. (1997-09-05). "The Complete Genome Sequence of Escherichia coli K-12". Science. 277 (5331): 1453–1462. doi:10.1126/science.277.5331.1453. PMID 9278503.
- Riley, M. (2006-01-08). "Escherichia coli K-12: a cooperatively developed annotation snapshot--2005". Nucleic Acids Research. 34 (1): 1–9. doi:10.1093/nar/gkj405. ISSN 0305-1048. PMC 1325200. PMID 16397293.
- Karp, P. D. (2002-01-01). "The EcoCyc Database". Nucleic Acids Research. 30 (1): 56–58. doi:10.1093/nar/30.1.56. PMC 99147. PMID 11752253.
- Riley, M (1993-12-01). "Functions of the gene products of Escherichia coli". Microbiological Reviews. 57 (4): 862–952. doi:10.1128/mr.57.4.862-952.1993. PMC 372942. PMID 7508076.
