= Monica Verduzco-Gutierrez =

American academic physiatrist

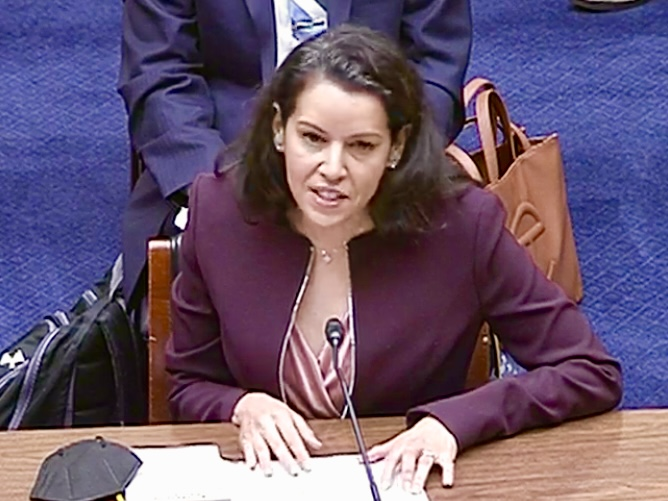
- Verduzco-Gutierrez testifying before Congress in 2022
- Born: 1979 (age 46–47) (Note: In 2017, Verduzco-Gutierrez was reported to be 38); Wharton, Texas, USA
- Spouse: Leonard Gutierrez (m. 2003)

Academic background
- Education: BA, 2001, Rice University; MD, 2005, Baylor College of Medicine

Academic work
- Institutions: Long School of Medicine; University of Texas Health Science Center at San Antonio

Monica Verduzco-Gutierrez (born 1979) is an American academic physiatrist and rehabilitative medicine physician. She is a professor and chair of the Department of Physical Medicine and Rehabilitation at the Long School of Medicine within the University of Texas Health Science Center at San Antonio. She previously served as the medical director of the Brain Injury and Stroke Program at TIRR Memorial Hermann.

== Early life and education ==
Verduzco-Gutierrez was born in Wharton, Texas to a Mexican-American family. Her father was a pipe fitter by profession but chose to move the family to Rio Grande Valley to return to college and complete a Bachelor's degree. She was raised in Rio Grande Valley and graduated from McAllen High School as valedictorian. During her high school years, she ran on their cross country and track teams.

Upon graduating high school, she moved to Houston, Texas to attend Rice University and earned her medical degree at Baylor College of Medicine. When reflecting on her childhood, Verduzco-Gutierrez said some of her early role models were her pediatrician and family physician, who were both Hispanic. While earning her medical degree, Verduzco-Gutierrez planned to return to her hometown and work as a pediatrician but she soon decided to pursue a different career after attending in a pre-clinical elective course in sports medicine. During her second year at Baylor, she became engaged to Leonard Gutierrez.

== Career ==
Upon earning her medical degree, Verduzco-Gutierrez completed her residency at between Baylor College of Medicine and the University of Texas Health Science Center at San Antonio (UT Health). In October 2009, she accepted an assistant professor position in UT Health's department of Physical Medicine and Rehabilitation. While serving in this role, she was admitted to the Program for Academic Leadership of the American Academy of Pediatrics, a three-year program aimed at developing the "academic leadership skills of early-career faculty." She also was appointed director of the Physical Medicine and Rehabilitation Consult service at Memorial Hermann–Texas Medical Center and medical director of the Brain Injury and Stroke Program at TIRR Memorial Hermann. As a result of her academic accomplishments, she was inducted into the UTHealth Academy of Master Educators in 2017.

As an associate professor, Verduzco-Gutierrez was chosen to be part of an interdisciplinary team to oversee the clinical trial of the first U.S. patient to participate in a global study of a stem cell therapy injected directly into the brain to treat stroke disability. During the COVID-19 pandemic in North America, Verduzco-Gutierrez was appointed Chair of the Department of Physical Medicine and Rehabilitation. In this role, she oversaw the opening of the post-COVID rehabilitation clinic in South Texas to help treat long-term effects including depression. In 2021, Verduzco-Gutierrez received the Distinguished Member Award from the American Academy of Physical Medicine and Rehabilitation for her efforts during the pandemic. In 2024, Verduzco-Gutierrez was a co-author on the National Academies of Sciences, Engineering, and Medicine's definition of Long COVID. As of 2026, she has an h-index of 27.
