= Monica Brown =

Monica Brown may refer to:

- Monica (singer) (Monica Denise Brown, born 1980), American singer
- Monica Lin Brown (born 1988), US soldier
- Monica Brown (author) (born 1969), Peruvian-American academic and author
