= Monica Shafaq =

British health advocate

- Education: Masters Degree
- Alma mater: Birmingham University & De Montfort University
- Occupation: British Mental Health advocate
- Organization: Chief Executive at Kaleidoscope Plus Group

Monica Shafaq is a British mental health advocate and chief executive at Kaleidoscope Plus Group.

== Education ==
Shafaq has a bachelor's degree in sociology from the University of Birmingham and a master's degree in housing from De Montfort University.

== Career ==
After her graduation from university, Shafaq undertook various roles including working as security personnel at Birningham International Convention Centre; in the departures lounge at Birmingham Airport and then a job as the manager of an Asian women's refuge. She then moved to the housing sector where she was a housing officer (at an organisation called Friendship Housing which no longer exists); she then secured a regional manager job at another housing association called Asra Midlands where she oversaw general needs and sheltered accommodation across the West Midlands.

Shafaq become housing services manager at Accord Housing Association. She became head of Neighbourhood Services overseeing all general needs accommodation as well as some specialist provision. This is where her interest in mental health developed. She then went to work as the CEO at Sandwell Mind, a small mental health charity that was affiliated to the national Mind network. It is under her leadership that Sandwell Mind was rebranded and became the Kaleidoscope Plus Group from 2014. She is the CEO at Gordon Moody. She is on the board of Manchester United F.C. Foundation.
