= Monica Ulmanu =

Romanian journalist and graphics editor

Monica Ulmanu is a Romanian journalist and visual editor. She has worked as a story editor for The New York Times since January 2025. Previously, she was a senior editor for visual storytelling for The Washington Post where she focused on climate and health-related topics.

She graduated from the University of Bucharest, and then received a Fulbright award in 2008. She completed her studies with a master's degree in visual communication at the Hussman School of Journalism and Media, University of North Carolina at Chapel Hill. She has also worked as a visual journalist for other media outlets such as The Guardian, Reuters, The Boston Globe, and The New York Times.

In 2020 she was part of the team who won a Pulitzer prize for the "2C: Beyond the Limit", covering the risk of temperature increase in planet earth. She has also won other design awards, such as the Malofiej Infographics Awards and the European Digital Media Awards, among others.
