= Monica Porter =

Hungarian-born British journalist

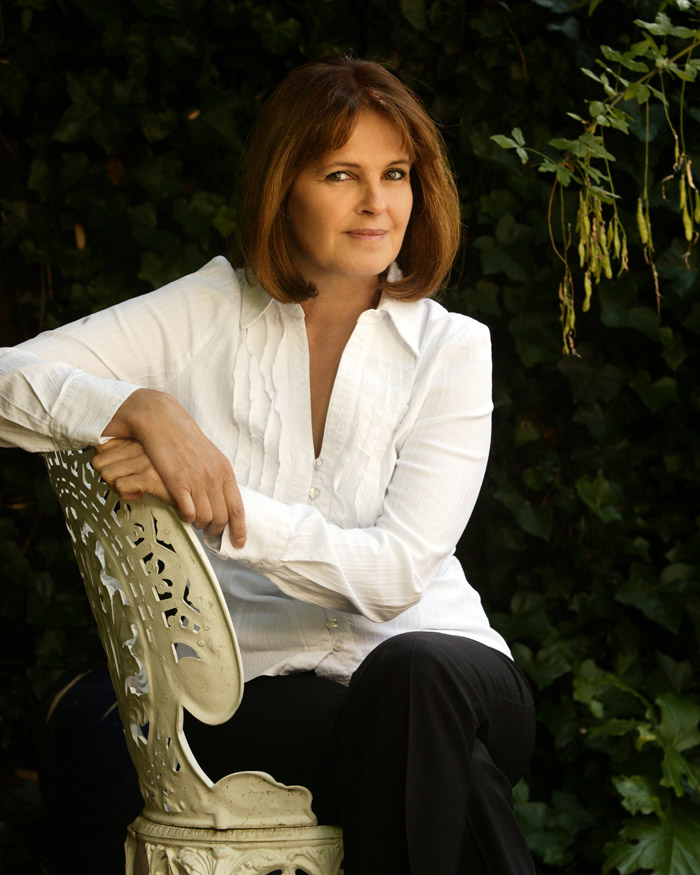
- Porter in 2009
- Born: Mónika Jolán Halász; 25 July 1952; Budapest, Hungary
- Occupations: Journalist and writer
- Spouse: Robin Porter (1974-1992)
- Children: 2
- Relatives: Vali Rácz (mother)
- Writing career
- Language: English
- Website: www.monicaporter.co.uk

Monica Porter (born Mónika Jolán Halász; 25 July 1952) is a London-based journalist whose writing frequently is centered on her Hungarian background.

== Early life and education ==
Porter was born in Budapest, Hungary. Her father, Péter Halász, was a writer and journalist, and her mother, Vali Rácz, was a singer. Her family fled from Hungary, in November 1956, when the Hungarian Revolution was suppressed by the Soviet Union. The Halasz family escaped to Austria and emigrated to the United States.

Monica Porter grew up first in the Bronx, New York City, and later in the suburb of Hartsdale, where she attended Woodlands High School from 1965 to 1970. In 1970 she moved to London, United Kingdom, in order to study acting at the Webber Douglas Academy of Dramatic Art. She left the academy after one year and began to write.

== Career ==
Porter's first published articles appeared in the weekly newspaper, The Stage. From 1974 to 1978 she worked as a staff writer on the Local Government Chronicle.

In the early 1970s, Porter also broadcast regularly for the Hungarian section of Radio Free Europe. In the early 1990s, she made a series of Personal View broadcasts for the English-language BBC World Service.

In 1981, Porter published her first book, The Paper Bridge: A Return to Budapest, a memoir of her return to Hungary at the beginning of the 1980s. It was re-printed in an expanded edition in 2009. Porter published her second book, Deadly Carousel: A Singer's Story of the Second World War, in 1990, and it was republished in 2006. Deadly Carousel tells the story of Porter's mother, Vali Rácz, who saved the lives of several Jewish people during the Nazi occupation of Hungary in 1944. Rácz was honored as a Righteous Gentile by Yad Vashem in 1992, as a result of Porter's book.

Throughout the 1990s Porter was a feature writer for the Daily Mail. In the 2000s and 2010, she worked as a freelance journalist, contributing to a number of British newspapers, including The Times, Sunday Times, Financial Times, The Guardian, Daily Telegraph, Daily Express, Evening Standard, Jewish Chronicle and Press Gazette, as well as magazines such as Good Housekeeping, Eve, Saga Magazine and Reader's Digest.

Porter's weekly Daily Mail column, Missing and Found, has been running since 1999. In 2010, Porter's book Long Lost, inspired by the column, was published.

== Bibliography ==
- The Paper Bridge: A Return to Budapest (1981)
- Deadly Carousel: A Singer's Story of the Second World War (1990)
- Dreams and Doorways: Turning Points in the Early Lives of Famous People (1993)
- Long Lost: The Story of the Newspaper Column That Started the Reunion Industry (1999)
- Raven: My Year of Dating Dangerously (2014)
- Children Against Hitler (2020)
- Benny and Bobby Versus Adolph (2022)
- A History of Europe in Twelve Cafes (upcoming release, April 2024)
