= Mónica López (politician) =

Mónica López is an Argentine politician. As of 2013 she was a provincial deputy in Buenos Aires Province. In October 2011, she was the candidate for the provincial vice-governorship on Francisco de Narváez's ticket as part of the Union for Social Development party (Unión para el Desarrollo Social). The elections resulted in the victory of incumbent governor Daniel Scioli.

López is recognized primarily in the political sphere of Buenos Aires Province. She is of Peronist extraction, and in addition to her post as provincial deputy, she heads a group of politically involved women called "United for the Province" (Unidas por la Provincia), which seeks to integrate active women politicians and representatives of social organizations.
