= John Rawlin =

English cricketer

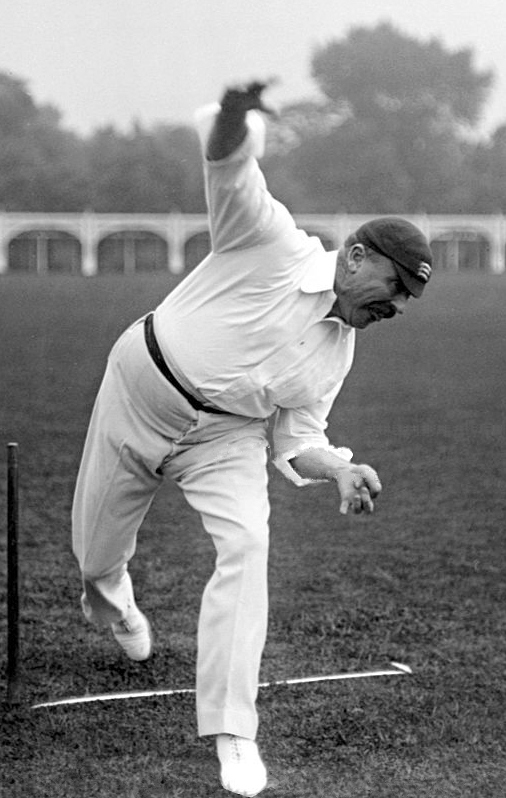

Personal information
- Full name: John Thomas Rawlin
- Born: 10 November 1856; Greasbrough, Rotherham, Yorkshire, England
- Died: 19 January 1924 (aged 67); Greasbrough, Rotherham, Yorkshire, England
- Batting: Right-handed
- Bowling: Right-arm fast-medium
- Relatives: Eric Rawlin (son)

Domestic team information
- Years: Team
- 1880–1885: Yorkshire
- 1887–1909: MCC
- 1889–1909: Middlesex

Career statistics
Competition	First-class
Matches	315
Runs scored	7,651
Batting average	17.04
100s/50s	2/31
Top score	122
Balls bowled	45,219
Wickets	811
Bowling average	20.57
5 wickets in innings	46
10 wickets in match	12
Best bowling	8/29
Catches/stumpings	201/–
- Source: CricketArchive, 25 June 2012

John Thomas Rawlin (10 November 1856 – 19 January 1924) was an English first-class cricketer, who played twenty seven matches for Yorkshire County Cricket Club between 1880 and 1885, and 229 matches for Middlesex between 1889 and 1909. He toured Australia with Vernon's team in 1887/89. He also played first-class games for the Marylebone Cricket Club (MCC) from 1887 to 1909.

Rawlin was born in Greasbrough, near Rotherham, Yorkshire, England. A right arm fast medium bowler and right-handed batsman, Rawlin played in 315 first-class matches. He took 811 wickets at an average of 20.57, with a best of 8 for 29 against Gloucestershire. He also took 8 for 50 against his old county Yorkshire. He took ten wickets in a match on twelve occasions, and five wickets in an innings 46 times. He scored 7,651 runs at 17.04, with a best score of 122 not out against W. G. Grace's London County Cricket Club. His other century came against Surrey, and he scored thirty one fifties. He also took 201 catches in the field.

He also played club cricket as a professional for Leek C.C. in Staffordshire from 1880 to 1882, and for Elsecar C.C. in 1883, before moving to Lincoln Lindholm C.C. He became a member of the MCC ground staff in 1887, and qualified for his new county by residence. He umpired at least two first-class matches – Middlesex versus Yorkshire at Lord's in 1890 (when he was still playing for Middlesex); and Oxford University v MCC in 1908. He became a coach, at Tonbridge School, after his retirement from the first-class game. His son, Eric Rawlin, also appeared briefly for Yorkshire County Cricket Club.

He played in other first-class games for A.J. Webbe's XI (1887–1899), North of England (1887), G.F. Vernon's XI (1887/88), Gentlemen of England (1888–1892), South of England (1892–1894), The Players (1892–1896), C.E. de Trafford's XI (1896), Wembley Park (1896) and H.D.G. Leveson-Gower's XI (1903)

Rawlin died in Greasbrough in January 1924.
