= Monica Reinagel =

American nutritionist

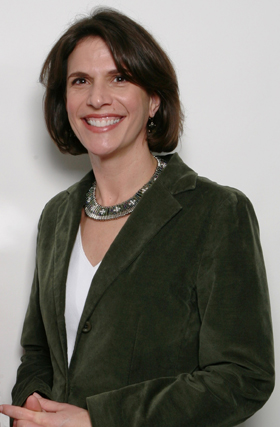
- Reinagel in 2012
- Born: November 25, 1964 (age 61); Buffalo, New York
- Occupations: Nutritionist, writer
- Writing career
- Language: English
- Genre: Health
- Notable works: Secrets of a Healthy Diet: What to Eat, What to Avoid and What to Stop Worrying About; Nutrition Diva and Change Academy podcasts; Nutrition GPA smartphone app
- Website: wellnessworkshere.com

Monica Reinagel is a licensed nutritionist based in Baltimore, United States.

== Early life ==
Reinagel was born in Buffalo, New York, on November 25, 1964. She was trained as a chef at Maryland's L'Academie de Cuisine, and earned a Master of Science in Human Nutrition from the University of Bridgeport.

== Career ==
=== Podcasts ===
Since 2008, Reinagel has been the nutrition contributor to the website Quick And Dirty Tips. She produces a weekly five-to-seven-minute podcast focused on food, nutrition and health. In November 2012, the podcast was one of iTunes' top 10 Health podcasts in the United States and Canada. In 2023, Nutrition Diva was noted by The New York Times as one of "12 Health Podcasts worth Listening To."

In 2020, Reinagel launched the Change Academy, a podcast focusing on behavior change.

=== Media ===
Reinagel has appeared on television on The Dr. Oz Show, CBS News, ABC Eyewitness News, Today and NY1, and in print and online publications including Chicago Tribune, Seattle Times and Washington Post. and U.S. News & World Report

Beginning in 2011, she was a regular contributor to the Huffington Post as a part of their "Healthy Living" section, advising readers on weight loss and healthy eating.

Between 2015 and 2020, Reinagel published a regular column on food and nutrition for Scientific American. She has also been a frequent contributor to Food & Nutrition magazine (a publication of the Academy of Nutrition and Dietetics), and produces a regular feature called Smart Nutrition for WYPR in Baltimore. She was the chief nutritionist for Conde Nast's NutritionData website from 2007 until 2010.

=== Professional Affiliations ===
Reinagel serves on the Expert Advisory Panel for U.S. News & World Report’s annual “Best Diets” rankings and on the Advisory Council of the True Health Initiative, a global coalition of health professionals advocating evidence-based lifestyle medicine

=== Nutrition GPA app ===
A novel smartphone app offers an alternative to diet tracking and promises to help you "upgrade your nutrition," by answering 10 yes-or-no questions about what you ate each day. The app assigns a grade for the day and then averages your daily grades to track your "nutrition grade point average." In 2018, the Nutrition GPA app was noted by The New York Times as one of four "Best Food-Tracking Apps for you."

=== Speaking ===
Reinagel has presented keynotes and workshops at a variety of national and international forums of wellness and health professionals, including the 2025 IDEA/ACSM Health and Fitness Summit, International Foundation of Employee Benefit Plans 2023 Health and Benefits Conference and Expo, the Association of Washington Cities 2023 Healthy Worksite Summit, and IDEA Health and Fitness Association's 2019 Nutrition and Behavioral Change Summit.

=== IF Rating ===
Systemic inflammation has been linked to an array of adverse health outcomes, and diet has a measurable effect on markers of inflammation as well as inflammation-related morbidities.

In 2006, Reinagel introduced the IF Ratings, a system that attempts to predict the inflammatory or anti-inflammatory potential of foods and mixed meals based on their nutrient composition. Reinagel cites peer-reviewed published research on the associations between various nutrients, food components, and dietary patterns on inflammatory markers such as C-reactive protein as the basis for the unpublished formula used to produce the ratings. No analyses of the statistical validity of the IF Ratings or results of any controlled interventions have been published.

Similar to other proponents of anti-inflammatory diets, such as Barry Sears, Nicholas Perricone, and Andrew Weil, Reinagel recommends incorporating more anti-inflammatory foods such as fish, nuts, olive oil, non-starchy vegetables and spices, and limiting refined grains, sugar, and saturated and hydrogenated fats.

=== Weighless.Life ===
The year-long program called Weighless which Monica created with Brock Armstrong, combines nutrition and exercise science, behaviour modification, professional guidance, and community support to help you lose weight and keep it off long-term. The program was created out of a desire to help people reset their relationship with food and movement, rather than simply to help them lose weight. The catchphrase of the program "stop dieting and start weighing less" really sums up the program. Reinagel believes that we won't solve the obesity epidemic by inventing yet another diet, we will solve it by realizing that diets don't work.

== Opera ==
A classically trained singer, Reinagel has performed as a soloist with the Baltimore Opera Company, Ohio Light Opera, the Smithsonian Institution and Opera Lafayette, among others.

== Awards ==
- 2019 Recognized by The Daily Record as one of that year's most "Influential Marylanders"
- 2011 Apex Award for Excellence in How-To Writing ("The Fun and Frugal Fashion of Home Canning" – ADA Times)
- 2012 Gold Hermes Creative Award for Feature Writing, Academy of Nutrition and Dietetics ("Not Your Mother's Spice Cabinet" – Food & Nutrition)
- 2012 Podcast Awards Nominee: Health/Fitness category
- 2012 Stitcher Awards Nominee: Best Health & Lifestyle Podcast

== Bibliography ==
=== Hardcovers and paperbacks ===
- Secrets of Evening Primrose Oil (2000, St. Martin's Paperbacks)
- The Life Extension Revolution: The New Science of Growing Older Without Aging (2005, Bantam Books) – with Philip Lee Miller
- The Inflammation-Free Diet Plan (2006, McGraw-Hill)
- Nutrition Diva's Secrets for a Healthy Diet: What to Eat, What to Avoid, and What to Stop Worrying About (2011, St. Martin's Griffin)

=== E-books and audio books ===
- Nutrition Diva's 5 Secrets for Aging Well (2011, Macmillan Audio)
- Nutrition Diva's Grocery Store Survival Guide (2011, St. Martin's Griffin)
- How to Win at Losing: 10 Diet Myths That Keep You From Succeeding (2012, St. Martin’s Griffin)
- Nutrition Zombies: 10 Nutrition Myths That Refuse to Die (2012, St. Martin’s Griffin)
- Quick and Dirty Tips for Life After College (2012, St. Martin’s Griffin)
