= Mónica Zetzsche =

Argentine engineer

- Born: Mónica
- Citizenship: Argentina
- Education: University of Buenos Aires
- Occupation: Engineer

Mónica Susana López de Zetzsche is an Argentine engineer.

== Biography ==
Zetzsche studied Engineering at the University of Buenos Aires.

Since 1992 she presides López Castro SRL.

She has been President of YWCA (2003-2007).
