= Monica Rodriguez (disambiguation) =

Monica Rodriguez is an American politician in California.

Monica Rodriguez or Mónica Rodríguez may also refer to:

- Mónica Rodríguez (Mónica Rodríguez Guzmán, born 1988), Mexican footballer
- Mónica Rodríguez (astrophysicist) (Mónica Rodríguez Guillén, born 1969), Spanish astrophysicist working in Mexico
- Mónica Olivia Rodríguez (Mónica Olivia Rodríguez Saavedra, born 1989), Mexican parathlete and middle-distance runner
- Mónica Rodríguez (singer), Venezuelan singer and winner of the 2010 Latin Grammy Award for Best Christian Album

== See also ==
- Monica Pimentel (Monica Fiorella Pimentel Rodriguez, born 1989), Aruban taekwondo competitor
