= Monica Cafferky =

British freelance journalist

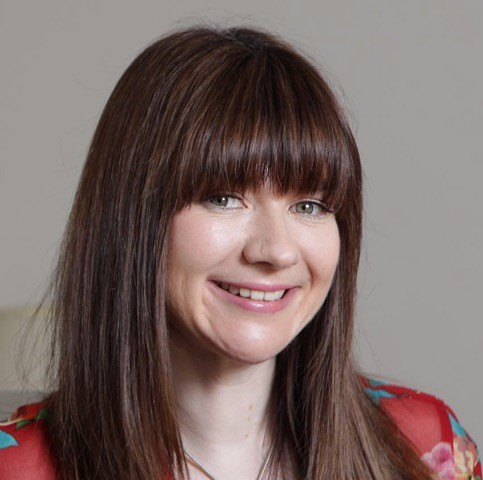
Monica Cafferky

Monica Cafferky is a British freelance journalist who has written for a number of publications including the Daily Mirror, Daily Mail, The Sun, Daily Express, The Guardian, News of the World, Star on Sunday, The Scotsman and Woman's Own.

== Career ==
Cafferky's first job was on a martial arts magazine followed by a two-year stint as a staff writer on Woman's Own. She went freelance in 2002, and had a weekly Mind, Body, Spirit page in "The Daily Mirror", which ran for three years.

Cafferky writes lifestyle articles for a number of publications.

Since 2014, she has been a Visiting Lecturer at The University of Huddersfield on the BA (Hons) Journalism course.

== Books ==
Cafferky's debut novel The Winter's Sleep was published in October 2019. Her social media accounts describe this as a spookily compelling tale of betrayal, fraud and ghosts.

Cafferky has co-authored three self-help books, which are published by Piatkus/Little Brown. The second book The Future Is Yours is an international best seller. All three books have been translated into several languages including: Japanese, Norwegian, Czech, Portuguese, Bulgarian, Slovak and Estonian. Instant Intuition (Piatkus, 2007, ISBN 978-0-7499-2757-8) The Future is Yours (Piatkus, 2007, ISBN 978-0-7499-2812-4) Cosmic Energy (Little Brown, 2009, ISBN 978-0-7499-0965-9).
