= Monica Jones =

Monica Jones may refer to:

- Monica Jones (activist), American transgender and sex work activist
- Monica Jones, lover of Philip Larkin
- Monica Moriarty (née Jones), Canadian curler
