= Monica Kraft =

American scientist, medical professor

- Education: University of California in San Francisco
- Occupations: Scientist, medical professor and researcher
- Known for: Asthma and airway disease cure
- Notable work: Research on the mechanisms of inflammation and innate immunity

Monica Kraft is an American scientist, medical professor and researcher. She is the System Chair of the Department of Medicine at the Icahn School of Medicine at Mount Sinai and Mount Sinai Health System. She is also the Murray M. Rosenberg Professor of Medicine.

Kraft is the recipient of Presidential Early Career Award for Scientists and Engineers 2000.

== Education ==
Kraft received her MD from the University of California in San Francisco, and completed her residency at Harbor-UCLA Medical Center.

== Career ==
At University of Arizona, Kraft was the Robert and Irene Flinn Endowed Professor and Chair of the Department of Medicine and Deputy Director of the Asthma and Airways Disease Research Center. At Duke University, she was former Chief of the Division of Pulmonary, Allergy, and Critical Care Medicine; the Charles Johnson Distinguished Professor; and Director of the Asthma, Allergy and Airway Center.

Kraft has also served as director of the Carl and Hazel Felt Laboratory in Adult Asthma Research and as medical director of the pulmonology physiology unit at the National Jewish Health in Denver.

Kraft has served as president of the American Thoracic Society in 2012 and 2013. As of 2022, Kraft is the System Chair of the Department of Medicine at Mount Sinai Health System and the Icahn School of Medicine at Mount Sinai.

== Research ==
Kraft specializes in translational asthma research. Her research centers around asthma, chronic obstructive pulmonary disease (COPD), and complex airway disease. The extensive studies done by her and her team on inflammation mechanisms and innate immunity has made contributions to the understanding of airway biology, the development of asthma treatment guidelines, and advancements in precision medicine. She has received a USD 7 million grant from National Institutes of Health for her research to gain understanding of the mediators responsible for regulating lung inflammation and to develop new therapies that can effectively mitigate severe asthma attacks.

== Publications ==
In addition to writing numerous journal articles, Kraft is an Associate Editor of the American Journal of Medicine, and a former Associate Editor of the European Respiratory Journal and the American Journal of Respiratory Cell and Molecular Biology.

== Awards and recognition ==
- Presidential Early Career Award for Scientists and Engineers
- The American Thoracic Society Distinguished Career Award
- The Elizabeth A. Rich Mentorship Award
- The American College of Chest Physicians Distinguished Educator Award
- Arizona Bioscience Researcher of the Year
