= Mónica Palacios =

Mónica Palacios may refer to:

- Mónica Palacios (politician), Ecuadorian politician
- Monica Palacios (playwright), Chicana lesbian American playwright and performer
