= Mónica González =

Mónica González may refer to:

- Mónica González (journalist) (1949), Chilean journalist
- Mónica González (dancer), Argentine theater dancer and vedette active in 2000s
- Mónica González (soccer) (1978), Mexican-American footballer
- Monica Gonzalez (boxer) (1988), Puerto Rican boxer
- Mónica Silvana González (1976), Spanish politician
