= Mónica Araya =

Costa Rican activist

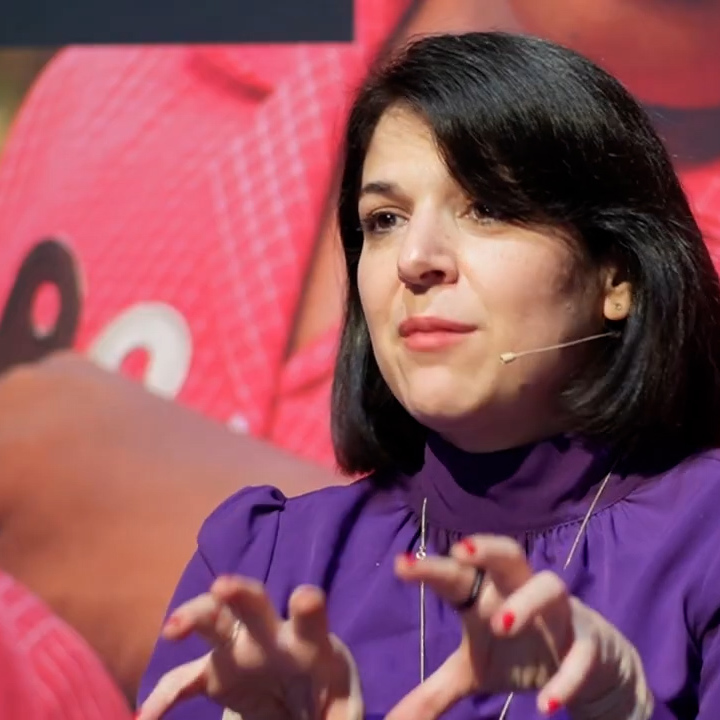
- in 2021 at COP26 (by Dave Malkoff)
- Born: Costa Rica
- Employer: European Climate Foundation
- Known for: Emissions-free transportation advocate

Mónica Araya is a Costa Rican emissions-free transportation advocate. She has been influential in making her country a leader in fossil free energy. She was considered one of the BBC's most influential and inspiring women in 2021.

== Life ==
Araya was born in Costa Rica. She has over twenty years experience as an advocate for sustainable living. She has a bachelor's and a master's degree in economic policy from the National University in Costa Rica and a master's and a doctorate in environmental management from Yale University.

Araya started for the thinktank E3G in 2009 and she was employed until 2011.

She writes and in "International Investment for Sustainable Development: Balancing Rights and Rewards" she explained in 2012 how foreign direct investment has been considered important in change in developed countries. However Araya considers that there was no evidence for this association. She considers how corporates, market forces and non governmental organisations can influence environmental change.

In 2016 she was a member of the largest group of women to visit the Antarctic. In that year she gave a TED talk about the energy situation in Costa Rica. Despite being a developing country they generate nearly all of their electricity from renewable sources. However, as a country 70% of their energy came from oil and this was mainly due to the power required for transport. That one video had 1.4m views in 2021.

Araya's TED talks include an interview by Chris Anderson. Her talk explains how transport can be moved to be electrically powered and about a global campaign named "Drive Electric". Araya founded the citizen organisation Costa Rica Limpia which has played a part in establishing Costa Rica as a leader in sustainability. During COP26 in Glasgow she was interviewed by Dave Malkoff of the Weather Channel.

In 2021 she was recognised as one of the BBC's 100 Women as a "defender of emission-free transport". The BBC recognised her in their science category as one of the years most "influential and inspiring" women.
