= Monica Tadros =

American plastic and reconstructive surgeon

- Born: 1974 (age 51–52)
- Education: Massachusetts Institute of Technology, Jefferson Medical College, Georgetown University Hospital.
- Occupations: Plastic and reconstructive surgeon
- Known for: Plastic surgery
- Website: www.drmonicatadros.com

Monica Tadros (born 1974) is an American plastic and reconstructive surgeon at the Center for Sinus Sleep & Facial Plastic Surgery in Manhattan and in Bergen County, New Jersey. She specializes in rhinoplasty, sinus surgery, plastic surgery and holds a dual board certification in Otolaryngology-Head & Neck Surgery and Facial plastic & Reconstructive surgery. Since 2006, she has been appointed Director of Facial Plastic & Reconstructive Surgery and Assistant Professor of Otolaryngology-Head & Neck Surgery at Columbia University.

== Education ==
Tadros attended college at the Massachusetts Institute of Technology (MIT) and Jefferson Medical College at Thomas Jefferson University in Philadelphia, Pennsylvania, where she received her medical degree in 2000. Then, she had a residency training in general surgery and Otolaryngology-Head & Neck Surgery at Georgetown University Medical Center in Washington, D.C. She received two fellowships: one in Facial Plastic & Reconstructive Surgery and another in cranial base surgery and neurosurgical reconstruction at St. Luke's–Roosevelt Hospital Center and Columbia University College of Physicians and Surgeons.

== Career ==
During her career, Tadros has been appointed member of the board of directors of the American Academy of Otolaryngology and several times at the American Association of Occupational Health Nurses (AAO-HNS), chair of young physicians section (2010-2013), Residents & Fellows Section (2004), and a Member at Large (2003). She was a founding member and member of the Board of Directors of the New York Head & Neck Institute (NYHNI) in 2010.

== Publications ==
The following is a list of Tadros's notable publications:

- Advances in Cranioplasty: A Simplified Algorithm to Guide Cranial Reconstruction of Acquired Defects. Facial Plastic Surgery. Vol. 1, No. 1, January 2008.
- Advanced Therapy in Facial Plastic and Reconstructive Surgery. Chapter: Contemporary Management of Frontal Sinus Fractures.
- Surgical Facial Rejuvenation. Chapter: Facial Aesthetics: Minimally-Invasive Office Procedures.
- Facial Plastic and Reconstructive Surgery. Chapter: Facial Plating Systems. 2006.

== Professional affiliation ==
Tadros is a fellow of the American College of Surgeons since 2009, the American Board of Otolaryngology, the American Academy of Otolaryngology-Head & Neck Surgery, the American Academy of Facial Plastic and Reconstructive Surgery, She is also affiliated with the New York Presbyterian, Columbia University Medical Center, St. Luke's-Roosevelt Hospital, New York, NY, the Holy Name Medical Center, Teaneck, New Jersey and Lenox Hill Hospital in New York City, New York.

== Awards and recognition ==
- 2013 - Honor award for outstanding leadership by the American Academy of Otolaryngology-Head & Neck Surgery.
- 2008 - AAFPRS Honors Dr. Tadros for her Pioneer Work in Aesthetic Facial Surgery.
- 2007 - Holt Leadership Award presented to Tadros by Academy of Otolaryngology.
