= Monica Caprini =

Italian women's international footballer

Personal information
- Date of birth: 15 May 1974 (age 52)
- Position: Defender

Senior career*
Years	Team	Apps	(Gls)
- Ruco Line Lazio

International career
- Italy
- * Club domestic league appearances and goals

Monica Caprini (born 15 May 1974) is an Italian women's international footballer who plays as a defender. She is a member of the Italy women's national football team. She was part of the team at the UEFA Women's Euro 2001. On club level she plays for Ruco Line Lazio in Italy.
