= Monica Rogati =

Romanian-American data scientist

- Born: Romania
- Education: B.S. in Computer Science; MS and PhD in Computer Science
- Alma mater: Tudor Vianu National College of Computer Science; University of New Mexico; Carnegie Mellon University
- Known for: data scientist Data Science Hierarchy of Needs
- Scientific career
- Fields: data science
- Workplaces: LinkedIn, Jawbone, Data Collective

Monica Rogati is a Romania-born data scientist, computer scientist and the former Vice President of Data at Jawbone. Before that, she was a senior data scientist at LinkedIn.

== Early life and education ==
Rogati was born in Romania, where she attended the Tudor Vianu National College of Computer Science. She earned a B.S. in Computer Science from the University of New Mexico, and went on to complete her MS and PhD in Computer Science at Carnegie Mellon University, where she focused on natural language processing and machine learning.

== Career ==
At LinkedIn, Rogati worked as a senior data scientist, where she developed the first machine learning models behind features like "People You May Know" and the job-matching system. In 2013, she joined Jawbone as Vice President of Data, where she led a team that used sensor data from wearable devices to develop health insights and behavior models.

Rogati is currently an equity partner at Data Collective (DCVC), a scientific advisor at CrowdFlower, and advises multiple startups as a fractional Chief Data Officer.

== Thought leadership ==
Rogati created the "Data Science Hierarchy of Needs," a framework that illustrates the foundational layers required for AI success, from raw data collection to deep learning. This model is widely referenced in the industry and in nonprofit technology strategy.

She is also a frequent speaker at conferences, known for advocating ethical data practices and practical machine learning implementations. Her writings and interviews have appeared in outlets like Medium, Forbes, and The New York Times.

== Media ==
Rogati has been featured in the New York Times, Recode, and Wired.

In 2014, she was named a "Big Data All-Star" by Fortune and one of the "100 Most Creative People in Business" by Fast Company. In 2013, she was named an "Enterprise Superstar" by VentureBeat.
