= IDEA Health and Fitness Association =

IDEA Health & Fitness Association is a membership association for fitness and wellness professionals. Since April 2022, its owner and CEO is Amy Boone Thompson. It was previously owned by Outside Inc., which had purchased it from Active Interest Media in 2020.

The association’s approximately 12,000 members hail from over 80 countries, with most members living and practicing their craft in North America. Members are personal fitness trainers, group fitness instructors, body-mind-spirit professionals (yoga, Pilates, etc.), and health club facility owners, managers and fitness program directors.

IDEA turns out 4 editions of its flagship digital magazine Digital Fitness Journal. Additionally, the association offers two free monthly digital information vehicles that reach approximately 70,000 people with each edition of IDEA Fit tips and IDEA Food & Nutrition Tips. IDEA also delivers a Member Insights newsletter every month keeping its members updated on the latest news, education and trends coming out of the in the fitness industry. In all, IDEA delivers 28 unique drops across all its digital information vehicles.

IDEA runs 2 live events and trade shows per year: IDEA World Fitness Convention; IDEA & ACSM Health & Fitness Summit. Cumulatively, an estimated 10,000 people travel to these 2 conferences from around the globe each year to amass research-based knowledge in their respective fitness and wellness specialty areas.
