= Mónica Astorga Cremona =

Argentine Carmelite

- Church: Monastery of Santa Cruz and San José de Neuquén
- Term ended: 2021

Personal details
- Born: Astorga Cremona; 1967 (age 58–59) Buenos Aires, Argentina
- Denomination: Roman Catholic

Mónica Astorga Cremona OCD (born Astorga Cremona in 1967) is an Argentine activist for transgender women and former Discalced Carmelite. She was the prioress of the Convent of Santa Cruz and San José de Neuquén, before being forced out of that role due to her work helping transgender women.

Cremona is the founder of Costa Limay Sustainable Complex for Transgender Women, an affordable housing community. She also runs programs to help transgender women find employment. Cremona has received recognition for her advocacy work from Pope Francis.

== Biography ==
Cremona was born in 1967 in Buenos Aires. She joined the Discalced Carmelites when she was twenty years old, and later served as the prioress of her convent. Upon joining the Carmelites, she began working with young drug and alcohol addicts and ministered to the region's incarcerated people.

Since 2006, Cremona has been active in working with members of the transgender community in Neuquén. She started programs to encourage transgender women who are struggling addiction to overcome it and has helped some who worked as prostitutes to leave the sex trade and find other employment by teaching them other trades. She received support from Bishop Marcelo Angiolo Melani and Bishop Virginio Domingo Bressanelli for her work.

In 2020, Cremona founded the Costa Limay Sustainable Complex for Transgender Women, an afforable housing project for impoverished transgender women. Costa Limay is the first permanent residence in the world to be dedicated to transgender people. The complex, which is a two-story building with twelve studio apartments, was formally inaugurated on 10 August 2020 in a ceremony attended by Governor Omar Gutiérrez and Mayor Mariano Gaido. It was built on land in the Confluencia neighborhood that was donated to Cremona's monastery by the local district and the project was funded by the local provincial government, having been built by the Provincial Institute of Housing and Urban Development and costing about around 27.6 million pesos (around $300,000). The complex includes a large park used as a vegetable garden and recreational space. The housing program allows the women to live in the complex for life without having to pay rent.

Cremona wrote to Pope Francis, with whom she was friends with during his tenure as Archbishop of Buenos Aires, to inform him about the inauguration of the new housing complex, to which the pope replied, "God, who did not go to the seminary or study theology, will repay you abundantly" and said "May Jesus bless you and the Holy Virgin guide you." The pope also told Cremona that he is praying for her and the transgender women she assists, and asked that she, "don't forget to pray for me". Cremona has been referred to as "the nun of the trans" due to her work within the community.

In July 2022, when interviewed by the Jesuit James J. Martin for Outreach, Cremona said: "Transgender people existed before any ideology. If it difficult to judge the foundational experiences [of trans people]. Yes, I can say from my experience that the best thing is to know their lives, their sufferings and their joy. My invitation is to love like Jesus, not to judge."

At the end of 2020, Bishop Fernando Croxatto of the Diocese of Neuquén visited the monastery for an investigation and in early 2021 gave the feedback that Cremona's work working with the trans women was not appropriate for her vocation, ultimately leading to her resigning. After transferring to a monastery in Córdoba, where she met similar discrimination because of her social work, she moved to Buenos Aires where she continues her work on supporting those in need. In 2024, the Vatican accepted her removal from the Order of the Discalced Carmelites.
