= Mónica Aguilar Bonilla =

Costa Rican archaeologist

- Born: July 11, 1980 (age 46); San Jose, Costa Rica

Academic background
- Education: University of Costa Rica

Academic work
- Discipline: Archaeology
- Sub-discipline: Pre-Columbian societies of Costa Rica
- Institutions: University of Costa Rica

Mónica Aguilar Bonilla (born 11 July 1980 in San Jose) is a Costa-Rican archaeologist. She is a Professor of Archaeology and Anthropology in the Faculty of Social Sciences at the University of Costa Rica. Her current works are mainly about Costa Rican heritage. She has worked on documenting archaeological artifacts, artifacts repatriation, and application for World Heritage Status.

== Education ==
Bonilla graduated in 2011 with an MA from the University of Costa Rica. Previously she had studied for and graduated from two undergraduate degrees in anthropology (2002) and archaeology (2007).

== Research ==
Bonilla is an expert in the pre-Columbian societies of Costa-Rica and Costa-Rican archaeology. She studies cultural law and heritage, in terms of both tangible and intangible assets. She has worked on producing a dictionary of Costa Rican archaeological artifacts, putting indigenous artistry into context from pre-Columbian times to today. There is a long history of Costa Rica's heritage being looted for commercial gain. Under this context, she has studied the potential for the repatriation of over 16,000 artifacts collected by Minor Cooper Keith from the late nineteenth to early twentieth centuries, including 5,000 artifacts acquired by the Brooklyn Museum in the 1930s. Bonilla has studied the assemblages of material from Las Mercedes, including material collected by Minor Keith, and published a study on how huaqueros and archaeologists can work together to preserve Costa Rica's heritage. She worked to produce the first digital repository of work on the Guayabo National Monument. She has investigated the site of Agua Caliente.

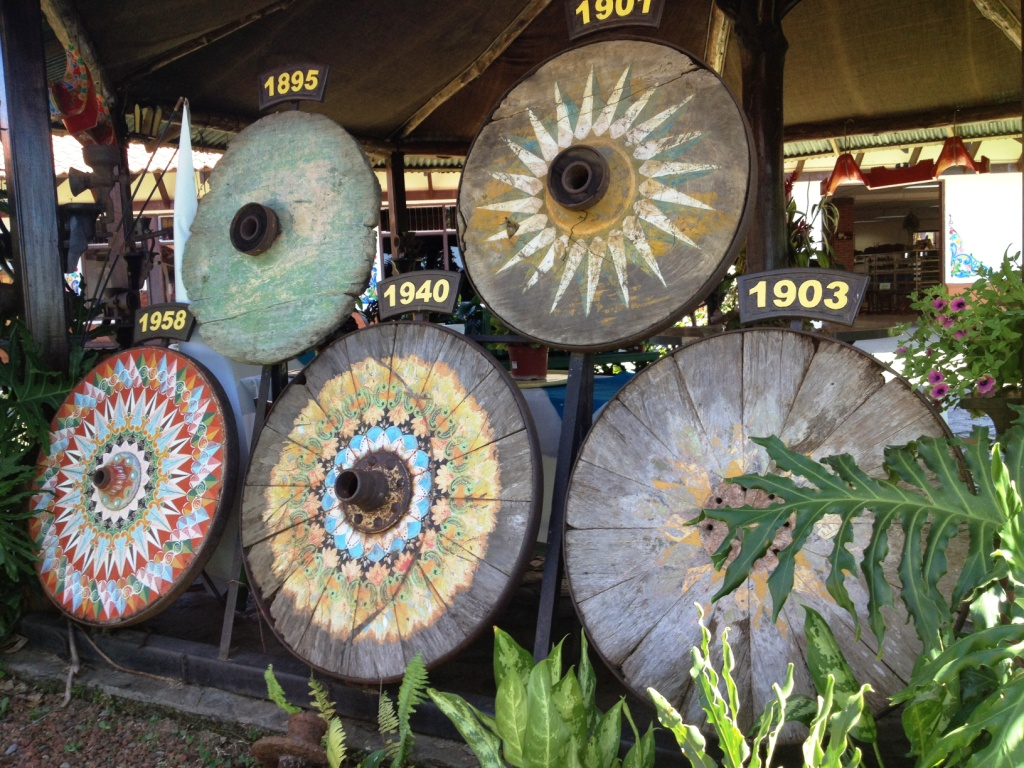
Examples of historic carreta wheels

In 2005, El Boyeo y la Carreta (the traditions of ox-herding and making ox-carts) were given UNESCO World Heritage Status (Intangible Heritage), based on a candidacy case prepared by Bonilla. The carreta (oxcart) is one of Costa Rica's most famous crafts, used to transport coffee beans, their wheels are a hybrid of Spanish spokes and Aztec disc design. The UNESCO listing has led to a cultural revival, which has increased tourism.

In 2018 Bonilla began a research project investigating the industrial heritage of Costa Rica for the first time. One of the first areas to be explored is Abangares in Guanacaste, where mineral extraction has been an important industry for two hundreds years and linked to global supply chains. Companies invested in the area whose artefacts are in the archaeological record, included: Cyanide Plant Supply Company, London, England and National Manufacturing Company, Dayton, Ohio, USA.

Her other academic interests include the paleo-environment of Central America, pre-Columbian musical instruments and digital heritage.

== Membership ==
Bonilla has been a member of ICOMOS Costa Rica since 2007.
