= Steffanie Strathdee =

Canadian epidemiologist (born 1966)

Steffanie A. Strathdee
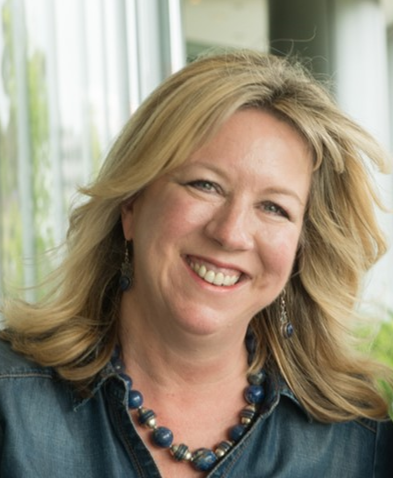
- Strathdee in 2017
- Born: Steffanie A. Strathdee; May 28, 1966 (age 60); Canada
- Education: University of Toronto
- Scientific career
- Fields: Infectious disease epidemiology
- Workplaces: University of California, San Diego; Johns Hopkins University

Steffanie A. Strathdee (born May 28, 1966) is the Harold Simon Distinguished Professor at the University of California San Diego School of Medicine and Co-Director at the Center for Innovative Phage Applications and Therapeutics. She is known for her work on HIV research and prevention programmes in Tijuana.

Strathdee was named one of the 50 Most Influential People in Health Care for 2018 by TIME magazine and in 2024, was listed 'Top Female Scientists' by Research.com (#304 in the U.S. and #499 in the world).

== Career ==
=== Early career ===
Strathdee is a Canadian-born infectious disease epidemiologist who has spent most of her career focusing on HIV prevention research in underserved, marginalized populations, including people who inject drugs, men who have sex with men, and people who engage in sex work. Her early research in Vancouver, Canada identified a major outbreak of HIV infection that occurred among people who inject drugs that occurred despite the presence of one of the largest needle exchange programs in North America; this led her and her colleagues to advocate for additional HIV prevention and treatment services in Vancouver from the provincial and federal governments.

In Vancouver, she founded the Vancouver Injection Drug Use study in 1996, and the Vanguard study of young men who have sex with men. Her work on these studies led her to identify social determinants as independent predictors of HIV risk taking. She received a Young Investigator's Award from the International AIDS Society in 1996 for this research. In 1998, she published a manuscript in JAMA which showed that only half of HIV+ people who inject drugs who were medically eligible for antiretroviral therapy in Vancouver were actually receiving it, which subsequently led to intensified efforts to expand access to HIV care. She was recruited to Johns Hopkins Bloomberg School of Public Health in 1998, where she was an Associate Professor until 2003, before being recruited to the University of California San Diego in 2004.

=== Leadership in global health ===
Between 2008 and 2024, Strathdee was Associate Dean of Global Health Sciences with responsibility for oversight of UC San Diego's campus-wide Global Health Institute (GHI), which facilitated research, education, private partnerships across diverse disciplines and addressed global health challenges in the 21st century. Together with her husband at the time, Thomas "Tom" Patterson, she led a large research and training program on the Mexico–U.S. border. She was chief of the Division of Global Public Health in UC San Diego's Department of Medicine until 2017.

=== Role in promoting phage therapy ===
In 2016, Strathdee enlisted the help of an international team of physicians and researchers to save the life of Tom Patterson, her husband at the time with bacteriophage (phage) therapy after he acquired a life-threatening infection with a 'superbug', Acinetobacter baumannii. Although phage therapy had been used for one hundred years in Eastern Europe, it was not licensed for clinical use in the United States or most of Western Europe. Her former husband, Tom Patterson, appears to be the first person in the U.S. to be successfully cured from a systemic multi-drug-resistant bacterial infection with cocktails of intravenous bacteriophages. After the case was published, it received considerable attention in top medical journals including JAMA and Lancet, as well as numerous reports in the international press, including a TEDx talk and a presentation at the LIFE ITSELF conference. The Guardian listed this case as one of the top science stories of 2017. Since Tom Patterson's release from hospital in 2016, Strathdee and her physician friend, Robert "Chip" Schooley, who was responsible for treating Tom, have been actively involved in helping other patients receive phage therapy and have launched the Center for Innovative Phage Applications and Therapeutics (IPATH), the first phage therapy center in North America, at UCSD which is assisting patients with life-threatening superbug infections obtain treatment. IPATH's goal is to conduct translational research and rigorous clinical trials to determine if phage therapy is efficacious to enable its licensure and widespread use. Patterson made a full recovery and returned to work in April 2017 before retiring in 2020. In 2019, Strathdee and Patterson published a memoir about their story called The Perfect Predator: A Scientist's Race to Save Her Husband from a Deadly Superbug, which was published by Hachette Book Group in 2019. As a result of the Patterson case, hundreds of other patients with multidrug resistant bacterial infections have been treated with intravenous phage therapy with the help of IPATH, including Joel Grimwood and Isabelle Carnell-Holdaway. Joel Grimwood was a patient who was ineligible for heart transplantation due to antimicrobial resistant infection. With phage and antibiotic infusions, Grimwood was able to become healthy enough to undergo a successful heart transplantation. Isabelle Carnell-Holdaway was a 15-year-old patient that underwent experimental treatment in which she was the first person in the world to be administered genetically modified phages to fight a multi-drug resistant infection following lung transplantation. IPATH is a clinical site in the first NIH-funded trial of intravenous phage therapy that launched in October 2022 and is engaged in several other phage therapy trials.
