= Mónica Fernández =

Mónica Fernández may refer to:

- Mónica Fernández-Aceytuno (born 1961), Spanish biologist and writer
- Mónica Fernández Balboa (born 1966), Mexican politician
- Mónica Fernández (gymnast), Argentine competitor at the 2003 Trampoline World Championships
- Toti Fernández (born 1968), Guatemalan athlete
