= Mónica Gutiérrez =

Argentine journalist (born 1955)

- Born: Clara Mónica Gutiérrez; 8 March 1955 (age 71); Rosario, Santa Fe, Argentina
- Education: National University of Rosario
- Occupations: Journalist, television presenter
- Spouse: Alejandro Gawianski

Clara Mónica Gutiérrez (born 8 March 1955), is an Argentine journalist.

== Career ==
Mónica Gutiérrez made her debut on Rosario television while still a teenager in the 1970s. She holds a degree in Social Communication Sciences. During Argentina's last military dictatorship, she was the presenter of the news shows 60 minutos and Informe Uno, both on ATC. With the advent of democracy she remained with ATC, hosting Veintiocho millones, Treinta millones, Noticiero nacional, and the talk show Veinte mujeres. On cable television she hosted Treinta y nueve semanas y media and Las manos en la masa. She is currently the presenter of América noticias segunda edición together with Guillermo Andino on América TV.

== Awards and nominations ==
Martín Fierro Awards
Year	Category	Nominated work	Result	Ref.
1998	Best Female Journalistic Work	América Noticias	Nominated	
1999	Best Female Journalistic Work	América Noticias	Nominated	
2000	Best Female Journalistic Work	América Noticias	Winner	
2002	Best Female Journalistic Work	América Noticias	Nominated	
2003	Best Female Journalistic Work	América Noticias	Winner	
2004	Best Female Journalistic Work	América Noticias	Winner	
2005	Best Female Journalistic Work	América Noticias	Nominated	
2006	Best Female Journalistic Work	América Noticias	Nominated	
2007	Best Female Journalistic Work	América Noticias	Winner	
2008	Best Female Journalistic Work	América Noticias	Winner	
2013	Best Female Journalistic Work	América Noticias	Winner	
2016	Best Female Journalistic Work	América Noticias	Nominated	

Martín Fierro Cable Awards
Year	Category	Nominated work	Result	Ref.
1995	Best Female Journalistic Work	Noticiero VCC	Nominated	
1997	Best Female Hosting	Las unas y los otros	Nominated	
2002	Best Female Journalistic Work	Las manos en la masa	Nominated	
2004	Best Female Journalistic Work	Las manos en la masa	Winner	
2005	Best Female Journalistic Work	Las manos en la masa	Winner	
2010	Best Female Journalistic Work	Las manos en la masa	Nominated	

- Distinción Alicia Moreau de Justo (1990)
- ATVC for Best Journalist (1993)
- Konex Award (1997)

== Honors ==
- Honorary citizen of the Italian Republic, on the part of comune Gagliato, Catanzaro, Calabria
- Order of Cavaliere della Repubblica Italiana, presidency of Francesco Cossiga
