= Monica Garza =

Mexican artist

- Born: 1988 (age 37–38); Alamogordo, New Mexico
- Occupation: painter

Monica Garza (born 1988) is an American artist, of Mexican and Korean ancestry, based in Atlanta, Georgia. She specializes in painting care-free, ethically and racially ambiguous women of color, of all body types. She is known for nude, contemporary portraits, contemporary figurative painting, sex and racial ethnicity, ceramic, text, and sculpture work.

== Biography ==
Born in 1988 in Alamogordo, New Mexico, Garza has a multi-cultural background with a Mexican father, and Korean mother. Garza resides in Atlanta, Georgia, where she focuses on her art after traveling on and off consistently. Her art work depicts women of different shades, doing different activities. Garza focuses on themes of sex positivity, self portraits, and modern day technology in her artwork. She emphasizes being unapologetically herself, when creating nude portraits of women doing the normal day-to-day functions. She creates her paintings based on her own cultural background and memories, which mainly exhibit women.

== Education ==
When Garza was 18 years old, she attended Syracruse University until she left to travel to Kibera, Kenya. Soon after, Garza attended California College of the Arts in San Francisco, where she earned a BFA in painting and drawing.

== Artworks ==
=== Bonjour De Monique, 2018 ===
This art piece by Garza consists of acrylic, wool, embroidery string, and oil pastel on canvas. It is held in the VI Gallery at the Mine II show. This piece displays a woman who appears to be enjoying her solitude in her own space. The color scheme is a soft pink, and a dark blue. The background displays a chaotic area with cups, utensils, and plants.

=== Desayuno 17, 2017 ===
This art piece by Garza consists of acrylic and oil pastel on canvas. It is held in the VI Gallery at the "Copenhagen V Show. This piece displays two racially ambiguous women very close to each other, sitting down on separate chairs. Their bodies are connecting through the palm of their hands.

=== Spf, 2016 ===
This art piece by Garza consists of acrylic and oil pastel on paper. This piece by Garza displays a woman, specifically a woman of color, laying on a red rectangular object. The woman in the painting is nude, with a blue rectangular object adjacent to the red object. Fruit is also displayed in the painting, above the woman.

== Exhibitions ==
=== Solo exhibitions ===
- 2019 Laredo, V1 Gallery V
- 2017 Monica Kim Garza: Jangalang, New Image Art, West Hollywood

=== Group shows ===
- 2019
  - One Thousand and One Nights, Artual Gallery, Beirut
- 2018
  - MINE II, V1 Gallery, Copenhagen V
  - Drawing Room, Over the Influence, Hong Kong
  - 'EXTRA, The Hole, New York
  - The Beyond: Georgia O'Keeffe and Contemporary Art, North Carolina Museum of Art, North Carolina
- 2017
  - Mine- Art, signed books, exhibition catalogues, artist books, collectibles, editions, posters, rarities, prints, and free stuff, V1 Gallery, Copenhagen V
  - Nude- Group exhibition, v1 Gallery, Copenhagen V
- 2016
  - Character, V1 Gallery, Copenhagen V
  - LIFEFORCE, The Untitled Space, New York

== Collections ==
Garza's work has been held at Crystal Bridges Museum in Bentonville, Arkansas, V1 Gallery in Copenhagen V, and New Image Art Gallery in West Hollywood, CA.
