= Monica Paulus =

Human rights activist from Papua New Guinea

- Born: Aregol, Chimbu Province, Papua New Guinea
- Occupation: Human rights worker
- Known for: Opposition to maltreatment of women for alleged "sorcery"
- Children: 3

Monica Paulus is a Papua New Guinean human rights activist from the Highlands of Papua New Guinea. She is a co-founder of the "Highlands Women Human Rights Defenders Network" and of "Stop Sorcery Violence" and concentrates her efforts on protecting women who have been accused of witchcraft or sorcery.

== Biography ==
Monica Paulus comes from the village of Aregol, in Simbu Province in the Highlands of Papua New Guinea. She is the mother of three children. As a young woman, she suffered considerable violence. In 2000 she joined a women's organization, Meri I Kirap Sapotim (Women Arise and Support). In the village, she began to put into practice what she learnt in order to defend women and children in village courts and mediations and to document cases. On occasion, she would report villagers, including her family, to the police. In March 2005, she and other women came together to form the Highlands Women Human Rights Defenders Network, with the help of Oxfam and the United Nations. They worked in small local groups to address, in particular, sorcery-related violence, but managed to make a change in the whole country with support from central government.

When her father died of a heart attack, her brother accused her of causing his death by witchcraft, in order to appropriate her share of the inheritance. Fearing for her life, she fled to the town of Goroka, after her family and the other people in the village had burnt her house down. The belief in black magic, sorcery, evil spirits and witches is widespread in Papua New Guinea and accusations of sorcery are common, particularly in the Highlands. Only in 2013 did the government repeal a law that criminalised sorcery and allowed accusations of witchcraft as a defence in murder cases. Sorcery is believed to account for sudden or unexplained death or illness, and women are six times more likely to be accused of sorcery than men. Sorcery accusations all too often become a form of family violence, with abusive husbands threatening or using such accusations to silence and control women. When the accused try to take shelter with relatives, their families often reject them as their "bride price" would have to be returned if the bride left the husband's home.

Every year, thousands of suspected "witches" and "sorcerers" are attacked in PNG. Few cases are prosecuted. Since her own experience, Paulus has provided assistance to people accused of witchcraft, giving them a place to hide, medical care, food, and contact with other people in a similar situation. Women are often accompanied by their babies, because according to the traditions of the country, if a woman is a witch, so are her children. Paulus assists women to go to the police and, if necessary, she helps them to relocate out of their communities. As one who had no one to help her when she was accused of sorcery, she feels strongly that someone must be available to support the accused women.

The work of Paulus has placed her and her children at risk from the police, the community and also the families of the perpetrators of violence. She had had her house broken into and everything taken and received death threats. Moving from place to place has become normal. She requested funds from the charity, Front Line Defenders, and moved to another province. Later, she had to move again. Paulus has worked with the "Kup Women for Peace", sponsored by Oxfam, which aims to put an end to inter-tribal warfare and ensure violence-free elections in part of Simbu. She has also worked with the YWCA and has been an interpreter for two UN Special Rapporteurs.

== Honours and awards ==
- In 2016, Paulus was part of the Protective Fellowship Scheme at the Centre for Applied Human Rights of the University of York in the United Kingdom. The fellowship allowed her to compare the PNG national action plan on sorcery and witchcraft-related violence and its activities, and incorporate the Highlands Women Human Rights Defenders' activities into that plan.
- In 2015, Paulus was one of 47 "Women of Achievement" celebrated by UN Women on the 20th anniversary of the Beijing Declaration, which had been issued at the World Conference on Women, 1995.
- In 2015, Paulus was a recipient of one of the Papua New Guinea Awards for Women, for her bravery and courage.
- In 2014, Amnesty International Australia described her as one of the bravest women in the world during its International Women's Day celebration.
- In 2021, she was recognized as one of the BBC's 100 women.
