= Monica Mya Maung =

Archivist active in Burma

Monica Mya Maung (née Sales; June 5, 1914 – 2008) was an English-born woman of colonial Burma who was known as the savior of Burmese history. In 1979, she was a recipient of the MBE.

== Early life ==
Monica Sales was born in England, June 5, 1914. There, she married Percy Mya Maung (d. 1987), a Burmese law graduate whose father was a judge.

She arrived in Rangoon in 1937 with her Burmese husband. She lived through World War II and Japanese occupation while working as a hospital nurse. It was when the war ended that she was appointed to the British Council's library staff. Since 2011, when the British Council reopened after an upgrade, it has been thriving as the only public library free of censorship in a country of 60 million population.

== Contributions ==
=== Preservation of Burmese scholarly literature ===
She worked as a deputy librarian of the British Council, which was located by Strand Road in Rangoon. In 1962, the Burmese military dictator and his troops overran the library and ordered to have the books sold off. Monica hastily hid 200 books in the British Embassy to save them from the coup which General Ne Win orchestrated. Her intervention had contributed to the preservation of Burmese scholarly literature which made her a recipient of the 1979 MBE.

Today, the books she protected are compiled and named after her as 'Mrs Monica Mya Maung Collection' in the British Council Library in Myanmar.

=== English tuition legacy ===
The local Burmese addressed her as "Auntie Monica" out of affection because she was also offering private tutoring sessions in 1950s. It was the beginning of the English tuition legacy which is widely prevalent in modern Yangon. Auntie Monica taught English part-time all the way through her 90s, even past her retirement after working at the British Council and the British Embassy for a total of 38 years.

== Personal life ==
Monica was married to Percy Mya Maung, who was a law graduate from St. John's College, Cambridge and son of a judge. He died in 1987. The couple had adopted children but did not have any of their own.

She died in Rangoon in 2008, at the age of 91.
