= Giuseppe Buonfiglio =

Italian soldier and historian

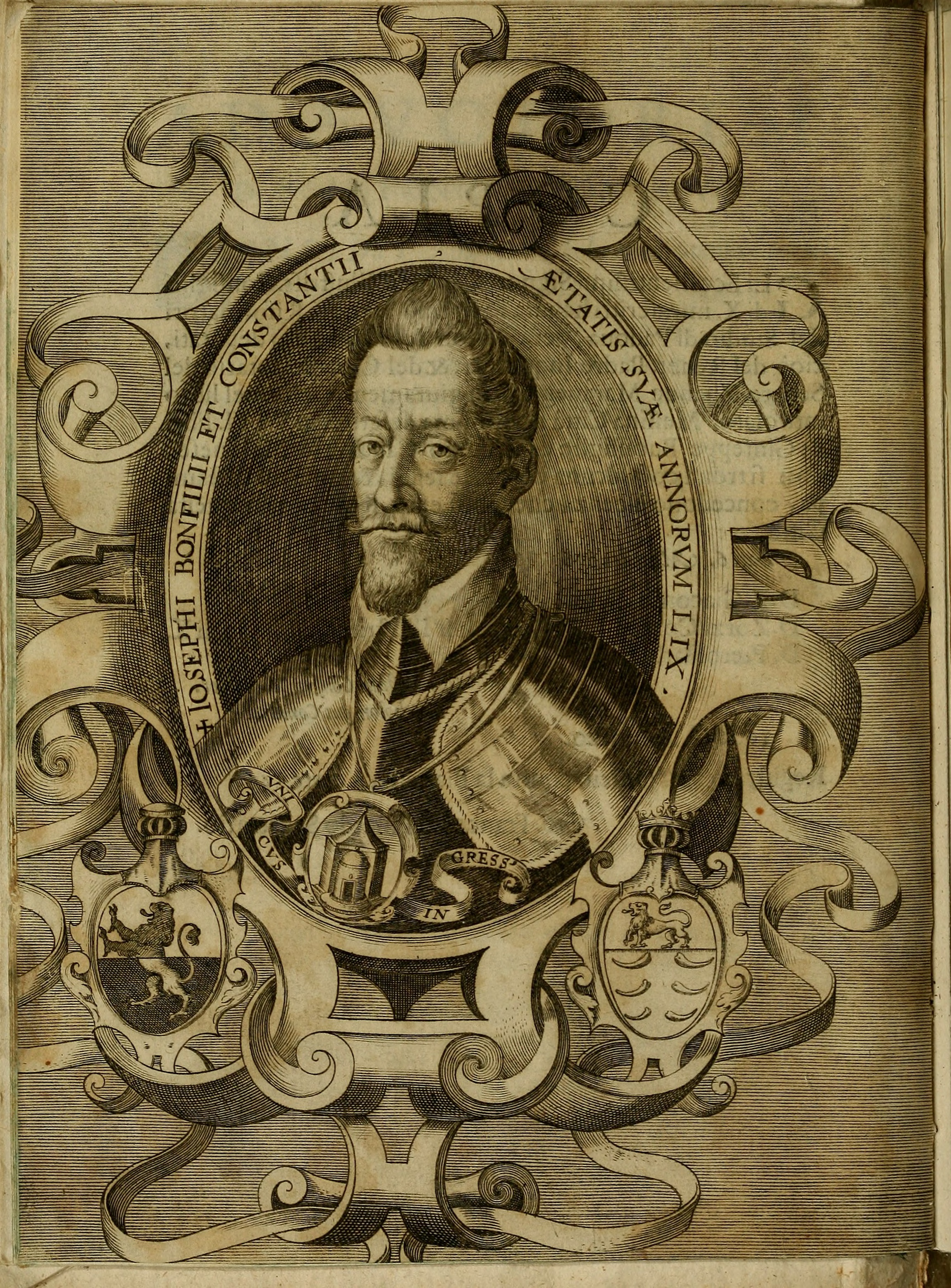
- Giuseppe Costanzo Buonfiglio
- Born: Giuseppe Costanzo Buonfiglio; 1547; Messina, Kingdom of Sicily
- Died: 21 December 1622 (aged 74–75); Messina, Kingdom of Sicily
- Occupations: Historian; Officer
- Father: Giovanni Artale

Academic work
- Discipline: History
- Sub-discipline: History of Sicily
- Notable works: Historia siciliana; Messina città nobilissima

Giuseppe Costanzo Buonfiglio (Messina, 1547 – Messina, 21 December 1622) was an Italian soldier and historian.

== Biography ==
Born in Messina in 1545, or according to other sources in 1547, by Giovanni Artale, baron of Casale and Trisino, he was at the service of the Duke of Alba during the Eighty Years' War.

On his return to Sicily, he wrote the Sicilian Historia, published in Venice in 1604, imbued "with a municipal pride that almost always prevents him from having a serene vision of the past." In 1595, when the Ottoman fleet, commanded by Sinan Pasha, threatened Messina, he was entrusted with the command of 600 arquebusiers and a company of horsemen. He died in Messina on 21 December 1622.

In 1721, Johann Lorenz von Mosheim translated into Latin and included in the Thesaurus antiquitatum et historiarum nobilissimarum insularum Siciliae (IX, coll. 1-120) by Johann Georg Graevius and Pieter Burman the work of Buonfiglio, with the title Messanae urbis nobilissimae descriptio, octo libris comprehensa.

== Main works ==
- Dell'historia siciliana: nella quale si contiene la descrittione antica et moderna di Sicilia ... dalla sua origine per sino alla morte del catolico re don Filippo II, raccolta per Gioseppe Buonfiglio Costanzo, In Venetia: appresso Bonifacio Ciero ; then in Messina: nella stampa di Pietro Brea, 1604-1613.
- Messina città nobilissima. Venice: Presso Gio. Antonio & Giacomo de' Franceschi. 1606.
- Anti apologia di Gioseppe Bonfiglio Costanzo caualier messinese. Contro gli apologisti, alleganti, e consulenti, e di qualunque altro nome nomar si possano. Contra la città di Messina; & suoi priuilegi, 1621.

== Bibliography ==
- Natale, Francesco (1959). Avviamento allo studio del Medio Evo siciliano. Florence: Le Monnier. pp. 67–70.
- Dizionario dei Siciliani illustri. Palermo: F. Ciuni, libraio editore. 1939. pp. 84, 156.

== Bibliography ==
- Tramontana, Salvatore (1972). "BUONFIGLIO, Costanzo Giuseppe". Dizionario Biografico degli Italiani (in Italian). Vol. 15: Buffoli–Caccianemici. Rome: Istituto dell'Enciclopedia Italiana. ISBN 978-88-12-00032-6.
