= Monica Buonfiglio =

Brazilian writer

Monica Buonfiglio is a Brazilian writer. She has written more than 60 books, which have been published in Brazil and abroad.

Many of Buonfiglio's books have been best-sellers. During 1995 and 1996 she sold six million copies, more books than any other author in Brazil, and had at least on book on the best seller list for 35 consecutive weeks. Buonfiglio's best-known books are Kabbalistic Angels and Heavenly Creatures which were also launched in the United States, Uruguay, Portugal, Venezuela, Argentina, Chile and Colombia. In 1996, three of the ten best selling books in Brazil, as listed by "VEJA Magazine", were written by Buonfiglio.

Buonfiglio was host of the daily context program "Abracadabra" on Rede Bandeirantes Television from 1989 to 1996. In 1997 Buonfiglio was a guest of the BBC in London for a special discussing her books with Michael Voss, Latin America correspondent. She was the subject of "Special Buonfiglio Monica on" Program SBT Reporter - Brazilian Television System, presented by Marilia Gabriela Herman in an interview with Henning. She was Presenter of the television program Table "Protection" on Network CNT/Gazette in 1997.

In 1998 she was a guest in the program "Besides," the network SIC Television - Portugal, with host William Thereza, on the subject of Angels. In 1999 she was interviewed on the CBS Television Network - USA by journalist Leila Cordeiro about her career and editorial releases in the country.

Buonfiglio also conducts conferences on topics such as Angels, Soul Mates, Life after death, Kabbalah, Regression memory, Numerology, and other spiritual topics. In 2014 she is a columnist for Terra, participating channel Esoteric. Her introductory teachings about Angelology (study of the Guardian Angels) have been presented in Brazil, Portugal, the United States and Colombia. She was a columnist for Destination Magazine 1n 1990, Headline in 1996, Predicciones-Buenos Aires, Argentina in 1997/1998.

Buonfiglio is a member of Equality Now - New York, a worldwide movement in defense of women's rights.

== Awards ==
In 1996 Buonfiglio was unanimously elected as "the most prominent writer in Brazil" by the Swiss Government, which installed a commemorative plaque "Monica Buonfiglio at the opening of the Library of the House Switzerland, in the city of New Fribourg/Rio de Janeiro".

Buonfiglio was presented with a "Professional Medal of Merit" by the Brazilian Academy of Art and Cultural History in 1996. She was listed among "The 100 Hits of The Decade" in 1999 by Marie Claire Magazine for her contributions to improving the lives of Brazilian people in general and women in particular. That year she received the "Homage of Merit" from the city of Curitiba in Paraná, for her contribution to cultural and philanthropic venues in Brazil.

Buonfiglio was presented with a "Votes of Praise," diploma by the city of Sorocaba, São Paulo, for cultural work on her program Monica Buonfiglio, aired on TV Sorocaba - SBT in 2002. In 2003 Buonfiglio was presented with the "Venus Award" on International Women's Day, by the "Integrated Center for Women" in Sorocaba, São Paulo.

== Personal ==
Buonfiglio has one son named Victor Buonfiglio.
