= Monica Rawlins =

British poster designer and artist

- Born: 1903
- Died: 1990 (aged 86–87)
- Occupations: designer and artist
- Known for: painting

Monica Rawlins (1903–1990) was a British poster designer and artist.

Rawlins studied at the Central School of Arts and Crafts in London from 1925 to 1928. She created numerous poster designs for London transport, including for London County Council Tramways, in the 1920s. A portrait of her daughter, painted in 1946, was part of the exhibition Writing the Century: The View from the Windows. She died in 1990. The Victoria and Albert Museum in London holds examples of her work.
