= Eliava =

Eliava is a surname. Notable people with the surname include:

- Akaki Eliava, Georgian military officer
- George Eliava
- Lia Eliava, Georgian actress
- Shalva Eliava
- Zaali Eliava, Georgian footballer

== See also ==
- George Eliava Institute
