= Roseophage =

Roseobacter-family bacteriophage

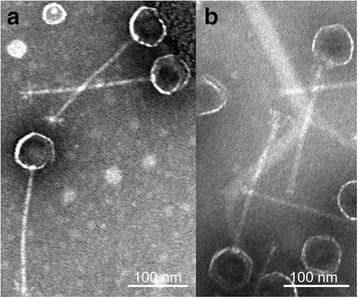
Electron micrographs of roseophage (a) vB_ThpS-P1 and (b) vB_PeaS-P1 particles.

A roseophage is a type of bacteriophage, a virus that replicates within bacteria and archaea. It specifically infects bacteria from the Roseobacter family (also called Rhodobacteraceae), which are one of the major groups of bacteria found in the marine environment. Roseophages have narrow host ranges, which can be seen in the list of known phages, and are a virus mainly found in marine ecosystems like pelagic, estuaries and coastal regions, at various depths.

== History ==
Roseophages were first identified during studies examining microbial dynamics in ocean ecosystems. The initial discovery occurred in 1989, when researchers investigating marine bacterioplankton isolated a phage named Roseophage SIO1 from the coastal waters of California. Using filtration and electron microscopy, researchers revealed that this phage shared genetic similarities with some non-marine bacteriophages. In 2000, SIO1 was sequenced and was found to have significant similarities to well-known non-marine bacteriophages such as coliphage T7 and Yersinia phage ΦA1122. Since then there have been multiple isolated strains from SIO1 that have been explored. The study marked the beginning of a broader scientific effort to characterize roseophages in marine environments, particularly in regions where Roseobacter species dominate microbial communities.

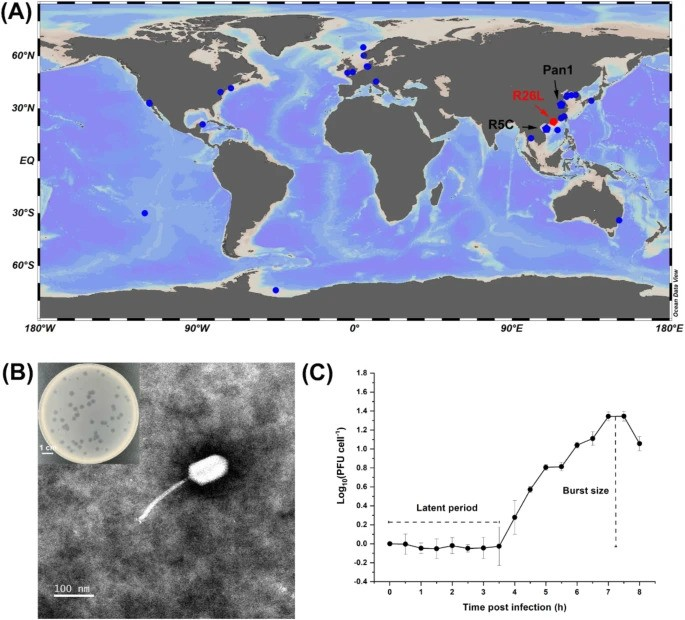
(A) Sampling site for R26L in Pearl River Estuary (red). (B) TEM of R26L roseophage (C) Growth curve of R26L, showing the latent period and burst size.

Subsequent research led to the identification of more roseophages in the Northern Hemisphere, including the isolation of Roseophage RDJLΦ2 from Roseobacter denitrificans OCh114 in coastal Chinese waters. Achieved through plaque assays, genome sequencing, and electron microscopy, this discovery expanded the understanding of roseophage diversity. Since then, roseophages have frequently been isolated from temperate, nutrient-rich coastal environments, where they play a key role in regulating microbial populations.

Roseophages are particularly abundant in coastal areas of the Northern Hemisphere. Their presence correlates with favourable environmental conditions such as optimal salinity, temperature, and organic matter availability which support Roseobacter populations. Advances in techniques like metagenomics and phylogenetic analysis have further enabled the detection of roseophages in marine environments worldwide.

== Lifestyles ==
Roseophages, such as other bacteriophages, have two different life cycles that they use to reproduce in host cells after injecting DNA into bacteria: the lysogenic cycle and the lytic cycle. Through the lysogenic cycle, the viruses can integrate into the genome of their host, while through the lytic cycle, the viruses take control of the host cell to specifically reproduce then lyse the host bacteria.

Roseophages can also be split into two lifestyles: temperate and virulent.

1. Temperate lifestyle viruses, such as pCB2047-A/C, can reproduce using either the lysogenic cycle or the lytic cycle. The ring morphology of this specific roseophage is an indicator of a temperate lifestyle, as well as the presence of integrase and repressor genes in both phage genomes.
2. Virulent lifestyle viruses, such as R4C, can only reproduce using the lytic cycle, thus they are more restricted in their reproduction. There are more roseophages that have virulent lifestyles rather than temperate lifestyles.

== Genome Structure ==
The genome structure of roseophages is highly diverse and reflects their adaptation to specific ecological niches. One defining feature is the presence of auxiliary metabolic genes (AMGs). These genes help enhance the metabolic abilities of Roseobacter hosts during infection, boosting processes such as photosynthesis and nitrogen cycling to support host productivity before cell lysis occurs. Analyzing roseophage AMGs distribution can determine whether a roseophage has a temperate or virulent lifestyle, as well as determine the host range as it correlates with AMG prevalence.

Their genomes often display high GC content and include conserved core genes that regulate crucial viral functions like lysis, replication, and DNA packaging. Comparative genomic studies of phages infecting Roseobacter pomeroyi DSS-3 and other related species have revealed both conserved elements and unique adaptations across different strains. The genome of roseophage SIO1 shares homology with both marine and non-marine phages. These genomic features have practical implications as they influence roseophage infectivity, life cycle regulation, and host specificity.

Notably, some globally distributed lytic roseophages contain unusual deoxythymidine-to-deoxyuridine substitutions in their DNA. This is a rare and distinctive trait that is thought to be an evolutionary adaptation to marine environments. Additionally, horizontal gene transfer appears to be a common feature among roseophages, enabling them to exchange genes with other marine viruses and contribute to microbial evolution in the ocean.

== Classification ==
Since the discovery of Roseophage SIO1, there have been increasing amounts of roseophages that have been isolated and studied over the years. As seen in the table below, most roseophages are from families of the Caudoviricetes class such as Podoviridae, Autographiviridae, Siphoviridae, however, there are several that also come from the Microviridae family.

=== List of Known Marine Roseophages ===
Phage Name	Family	Host	Isolation site (if provided)
CRP-1	Podoviridae	Planktomarina temperata FZCC0023	Osaka Bay, Japan
CRP-2	Podoviridae	Planktomarina temperata FZCC0023	Taiwan Strait
CRP-3	Podoviridae	Planktomarina temperata FZCC0040	Bohai Sea
CRP-4	Podoviridae	Planktomarina temperata FZCC0023	Bohai Sea
CRP-5	Podoviridae	Planktomarina temperata FZCC0040	Taiwan Strait
CRP-6	Podoviridae	Planktomarina temperata FZCC0042	Taiwan Strait
CRP-7	Podoviridae	Planktomarina temperata FZCC0042	Bohai Sea
CRP-9		Roseobacter FZCC0023	Pattaya Beach
CRP-13		Roseobacter FZCC0023	North Sea
CRP-114	Autographiviridae	Roseobacter FZCC0023	Bohai Sea
CRP-113	Autographiviridae	Roseobacter FZCC0023	East China Sea
CRP-118	Autographiviridae	Roseobacter FZCC0023	East China Sea
CRP-171	Autographiviridae	Roseobacter FZCC0023	East China Sea
CRP-143	Autographiviridae	Roseobacter FZCC0023	East China Sea
CRP-125	Autographiviridae	Roseobacter FZCC0023	East China Sea
CRP-227	Autographiviridae	Roseobacter FZCC0040	Bohai Sea
CRP-361	Autographiviridae	Roseobacter FZCC0042	Bohai Sea
CRP-403	Autographiviridae	Roseobacter FZCC0037	Indian Ocean
CRP-804	Autographiviridae	Roseobacter FZCC0196	Yellow Sea
CRP-810	Autographiviridae	Roseobacter FZCC0198	Yellow Sea
CRP-901	Caudociricetes class	CHAB-I-5 strain FZCC0083	North Sea
CRP-902	Caudociricetes class	CHAB-I-5 strain FZCC0083	Yellow Sea
CRPss-151	Microviridae	Roseobacter FZCC0023	North Sea
CRPss-152	Microviridae	Roseobacter FZCC0023	Yantai coast, Bohai Sea
CRPss-153	Microviridae	Roseobacter FZCC0023	Yantai coast, Bohai Sea
CRPss-154	Microviridae	Roseobacter FZCC0023	Yantai coast, Bohai Sea
CRPss-155	Microviridae	Roseobacter FZCC0023	Yantai coast, Bohai Sea
CRPss-251	Microviridae	Roseobacter FZCC0040	Pattaya Beach, Thailand
RPP1	Podoviridae	Roseobacter nubinhibens	L4 sampling station, English Channel
RLP1	Podoviridae	Roseovarius sp.217	Langstone Harbor,English Channel
RDJLΦ1	Siphoviridae	Roseobacter dinitrificans OCh114	South China Sea
RDJLΦ2	Siphoviridae	Roseobacter dinitrificans OCh114	Wuyuan Bay, Xiamen
DSS3Φ1	Siphoviridae	Ruegeria pomeroyi DSS3	Baltimore Inner Harbor, USA
DSS3Φ2	Podoviridae	Ruegeria pomeroyi DSS3	Baltimore Inner Harbor, USA
DSS3Φ22	Microviridae	Ruegeria pomeroyi DSS3	
DSS3_VP1	Podoviridae	Ruegeria pomeroyi DSS3	Venice, Italy
DSS3_PM1	Podoviridae	Ruegeria pomeroyi DSS3	Puerto Morelos, Mexico
DSS3Φ8	Siphoviridae	Ruegeria pomeroyi DSS3	Baltimore Inner Harbor, USA
EE36Φ1	Podoviridae	Sulfitobacter sp. EE36	Baltimore Inner Harbor, USA
vB_RpoMi-V15	Microviridae	Ruegeria pomeroyi DSS3	Baltimore Inner Harbor, USA
vB_RpoMi-Mini	Microviridae	Ruegeria pomeroyi DSS3	Baltimore Inner Harbor, USA
vB_PeaS-P1	Siphoviridae	Pelagibaca abyssi JLT2014	Southeastern Pacific Ocean
vB_ThpS-P1	Siphoviridae	Thiobacinimonas profunda JLT2016	Southeastern Pacific Ocean
pCB2051-A	Siphoviridae	Loktanella sp. CB2051	Norwegian Sea, Arctic
NYA-2014a	Podoviridae	Sulfitobacter strain 2047	
ΦCB2047-A	Podoviridae	Sulfitobacter strain 2047	Raunefjorden, Norway
ΦCB2047-B	Podoviridae	Sulfitobacter strain 2047	Norway
ΦCB2047-C	Podoviridae	Sulfitobacter strain 2047	Raunefjorden, Norway
vB_RpoS-V7	Siphoviridae	Ruegeria pomeroyi DSS3	Baltimore Inner Harbor, USA
vB_RpoS-V10	Siphoviridae	Ruegeria pomeroyi DSS3	Baltimore Inner Harbor, USA
vB_RpoS-V11	Siphoviridae	Ruegeria pomeroyi DSS3	Baltimore Inner Harbor, USA
vB_RpoS-V16	Siphoviridae	Ruegeria pomeroyi DSS3	Baltimore Inner Harbor, USA
vB_RpoS-V18	Siphoviridae	Ruegeria pomeroyi DSS3	Baltimore Inner Harbor, USA
vB_RpoP-V12	Podoviridae	Ruegeria pomeroyi DSS3	Baltimore Inner Harbor, USA
vB_RpoP-V13	Podoviridae	Ruegeria pomeroyi DSS3	Baltimore Inner Harbor, USA
vB_RpoP-V14	Podoviridae	Ruegeria pomeroyi DSS3	Baltimore Inner Harbor, USA
vB_RpoP-V17	Podoviridae	Ruegeria pomeroyi DSS3	Baltimore Inner Harbor, USA
vB_RpoP-V21	Podoviridae	Ruegeria pomeroyi DSS3	Baltimore Inner Harbor, USA
DS-1410Ws-06	Podoviridae	Dinoroseobacter shibae DFL12 and Roseobacter dinitrificans OCh114	Sanya Bay, Northern South China Sea
RD-1410W1-01	Podoviridae	Dinoroseobacter shibae DFL12, Roseobacter dinitrificans OCh114	Sanya Bay, Northern South China Sea
RD-1410Ws-07	Podoviridae	Roseobacter dinitrificans OCh114	Sanya Bay, Northern South China Sea
P12053L	Podoviridae	Celeribacter sp. strain IMCC12053	Yellow Sea
LenP_VB1	Podoviridae	Lentibacter sp. SH36	
LenP_VB2	Podoviridae	Lentibacter sp. SH36	
LenP_VB3	Podoviridae	Lentibacter sp. SH36	
SIO1-1989	Podoviridae	Roseobacter SIO67	Scripps Pier, California
SIO1-2001	Podoviridae	Roseobacter SIO67	Scripps Pier, California
OS-2001	Podoviridae	Roseobacter SIO67	Oceanside, California
SBRSIO67-2001	Podoviridae	Roseobacter SIO67, Roseobacter GAI-101	Solana Beach, California
MB-2001	Podoviridae	Roseobacter SIO67	Mission Bay, California
R26L	Siphoviridae-like	Dinoroseobacter shibae DFL12T	Pearl River Estuary, China
ICBM1	Podoviridae	Lentibacter sp. SH36	Southern North Sea
ICBM2	Podoviridae	Lentibacter sp. SH36	Southern North Sea
Tedan	Siphoviridae	Ruegeria pomeroyi AU67	Botany Bay
vB_DshP-R1	Podoviridae	Dinoroseobacter shibae DFL12	Baicheng Harbor, Xiamen
vB_DshP-R2C	Podoviridae	Dinoroseobacter shibae DFL12	Huangcuo station, Xiamen
vB_DshS-R4C	Siphoviridae	Dinoroseobacter shibae DFL12T	coastal waters of Xiamen
vB_DshS-R5C	Siphoviridae	Dinoroseobacter shibae DFL12	South China Sea

== Ecology ==
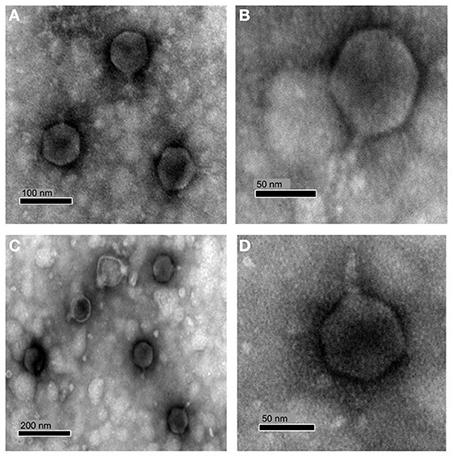
Roseophages RLP1 (A, B) and RPP1 (C, D). Magnification: (A) x120,000, (B) x300,000 (C) x75,000 and (D) x200,000.

Unable to replicate on their own, viruses must rely on bacteria in a symbiotic relationship. Roseophages have shown to boost DNA synthesis within Roseobacteria due to 4 AMGs: vB_DshP-R7L_gp29 (dcd) encoding dCMP deaminase, vB_DshP-R7L_gp32 (thyX) encoding thymidylate synthase, vB_DshP-R7L_gp43 (trx) encoding thioredoxin, vB_DshP-R7L_gp55 (rnr) encoding ribonucleotide reductase. DCMP deaminase (Dcd gene) converts deoxycytidine monophosphate (dCMP) to deoxyuridine monophosphate (dUMP). Thioredoxin reductase (trx gene) acts as a proton donor transferring protons from nicotinamide adenine dinucleotide phosphate (NADPH) to ribonucleotide reductase (rnr gene) reducing ribonucleoside diphosphate (rNDP) to deoxyribonucleoside diphosphate (dNDP). Thymidylate synthase (thyX gene) aids in pyrimidine synthesis converting dUMP to deoxythymidine monophosphate (dTMP). In all the prior metabolic pathways, roseophage AMGs provide genes that encode for proteins necessary for DNA synthesis for the host Roseobacteria.

In a process known as viral shunt, roseophages prevent the uptake of carbon and nutrients from higher trophic levels in the form of particulate organic matter (POM) and recycle matter as dissolved organic matter (DOM). As an integral part of the microbial loop, the lysis of Roseobacteria by roseophages recycles nutrients and organic matter back into the surrounding environment. This can optimize the effects of the biological pump in carbon sequestration producing larger primary producers like phytoplankton which can absorb more atmospheric carbon and sequester it into the deep ocean.

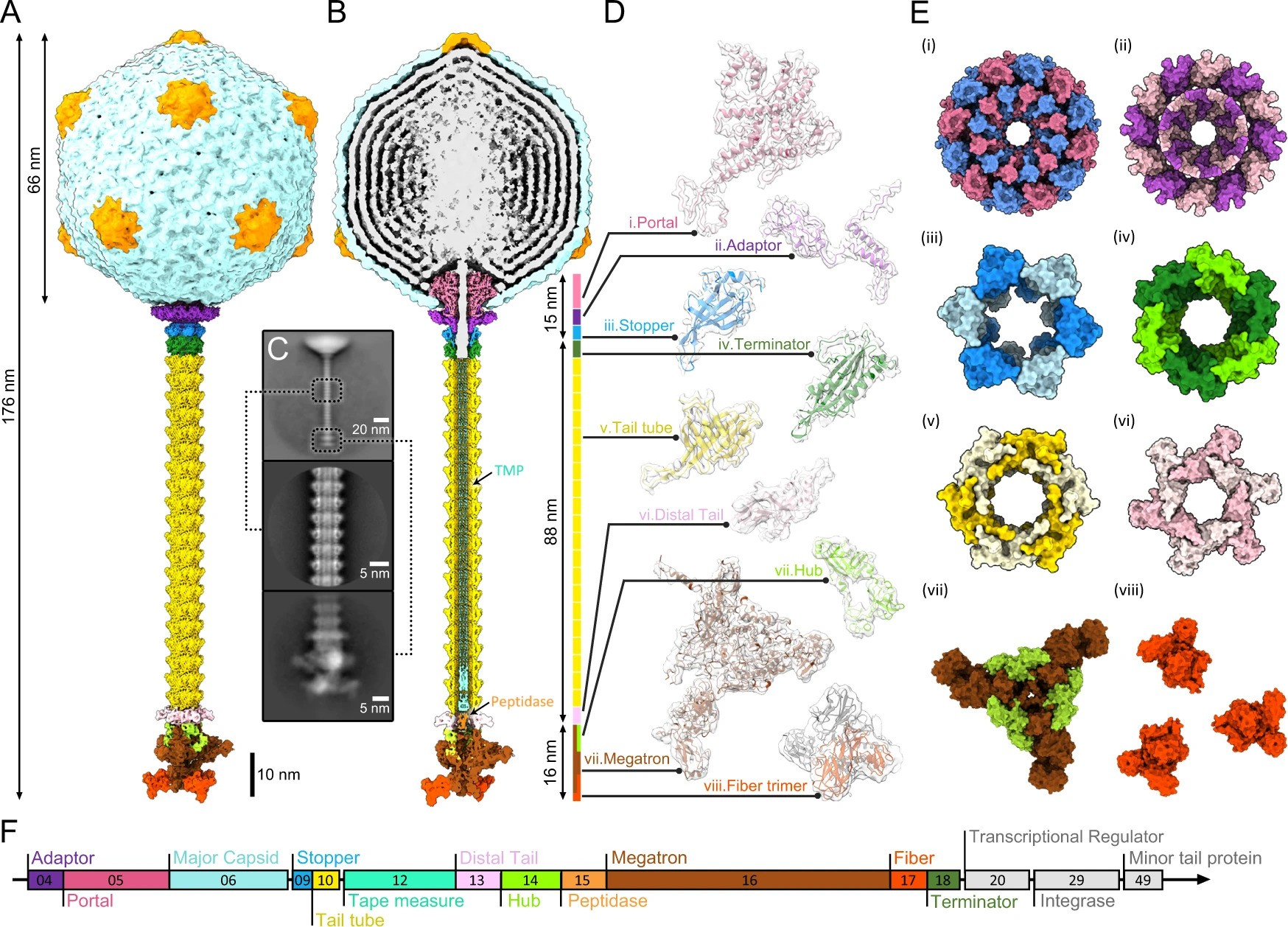
Overall architecture of the phage R4C with in-situ structure of the tail apparatus

Roseophages have shown potential to improve utilization of carbon and nitrogen sources in estuaries through the specific auxiliary metabolic gene vB_DshP-R7L_gp40 (nanS) which codes for Sialate O-acetylesterase. Sialic acids are sources of carbon and nitrogen however cannot be metabolized in their acetylated form. Sialate O-acetylesterase hydrolyze acetyl groups from sialic acids which can be readily taken up and metabolized by other microbes. Indirectly, roseophages could increase microbial uptake of nitrogen and carbon in estuaries enhancing productivity of metabolic functions which aid in the removal or degradation of pathogens or pollutants. As estuaries are an important aspect to nourish aquaculture and improve water for recreational use, applications of roseophages in estuaries as a waste water treatment technique could improve current water treatment strategies and further improve the quality of water in areas abundant in roseophages.
