= Diversity-generating retroelement =

Diversity-generating retroelements (DGRs) are a family of retroelements that were first found in Bordetella phage (BPP-1), and since been found in bacteria (e.g.Treponema denticola and Legionella pneumophila), Archaea, Archaean viruses (e.g. ANMV-1), temperate phages (e.g. Hankyphage and CrAss-like phage), and lytic phages. DGRs benefit their host by mutating particular regions of specific target proteins, for instance, phage tail fiber in BPP-1, lipoprotein in legionella pneumophila ( the pathogen behind Legionnaires disease), and TvpA in Treponema denticola (oral-associated periopathogen). An error-prone reverse transcriptase is responsible for generating these hypervariable regions in target proteins (Mutagenic retrohoming). In mutagenic retrohoming, a mutagenized cDNA (containing substantial A to N mutations) is reverse transcribed from a template region (TR), and is replaced with a segment similar to the template region called variable region (VR). Accessory variability determinant (Avd) protein is another component of DGRs, and its complex formation with the error-prone RT is of importance to mutagenic rehoming.

DGRs are beneficial to the evolution and survival of their host. A large fraction of Faecalibacterium prausnitzii phages contain DGRs that are believed to have a role in phage adaptability to the digestive system, as patients with inflammatory bowel disease (IBD), have more phages, but less F.prausnitzii in their stool samples compared to healthy individuals, suggesting that these phages activate during the illness, and that they may trigger F.prausnitzii depletion. Several tools have been implemented to identify DGRs, such as DiGReF, DGRscan, MetaCSST, and myDGR

== See also ==
- Retron
