= DGR =

DGR can stand for:

== Science and technology ==
- Dangerous Goods Regulations, for transport of hazardous substances
- Deep geological repository, a hazardous waste storage method
- Diversity-generating retroelement, in microbes

== Other uses ==
- Dante Gabriel Rossetti, Victorian painter and poet who co-founded the Pre-Raphaelite Brotherhood
- Dargaville Aerodrome, New Zealand, IATA code
- David Gilliland Racing, a North American motorsports team
- Deep Green Resistance, a ecofascist group
- Distinguished Gentleman's Ride, a worldwide motorcycle event for prostate cancer research
