= Affinity magnetic separation =

Laboratory tool that isolates bacterial cells

Affinitymagnetic separation (AMS) is a laboratory tool that can efficiently isolate bacterial cells out of body fluid or cultured cells. It can also be used as a method of quantifying the pathogenicity of food, blood or feces. Another laboratory separation tool is the immunomagnetic separation (IMS), which is more suitable for the isolation of eucaryotic cells.

== Technique ==
Host recognition of bacteriophages occur via bacteria-binding proteins that have strong binding affinities to specific protein or carbohydrate structures on the surface of the bacterial host. Bacteria-binding proteins derived from bacteriophage coating paramagnetic beads will bind to specific cell components present on the surface of host thus capturing the cells and facilitate the concentration of these bead-attached cells. The concentration process is created by a magnet placed on the side of the test tube bringing the beads to it. Due to the phage-ligand technology, AMS is superior to the antibody based immunomagnetic separation (IMS) on sorting bacterial cells.
