= Vladimir Balabanov =

Soviet and Georgian mathematician (1932–2021)

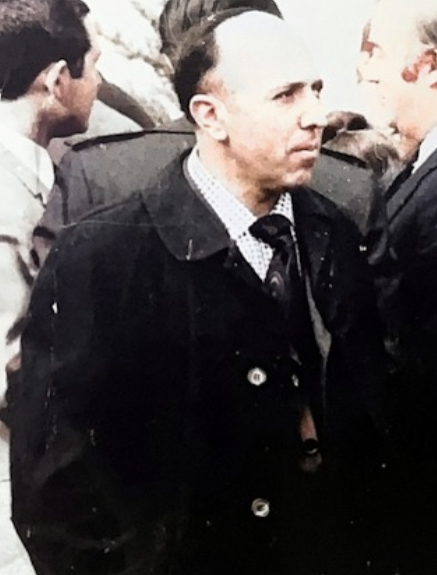
- Born: Vladimir Anastasovich Balabanov; 2 December 1932; Avranlo, Tsalka Municipality, Georgian Soviet Socialist Republic
- Died: 28 August 2021 (aged 88); Thessaloniki, Greece
- Citizenship: Soviet Union→Georgia Greece
- Education: Tbilisi Pedagogical University (Ph.D.)
- Scientific career
- Fields: Functional analysis
- Doctoral advisor: Elibzar Tsitlanadze

Vladimir Anastasovich Balabanov (Russian: Влади́мир Анаста́сович Балаба́нов, 2 December 1932, Avranlo, Georgian SSR — 28 August 2021, Thessaloniki, Greece) was a Soviet and Georgian mathematician of Greek origin, a Doctor of Physics and Mathematics and a professor.

== Biography ==
Vladimir Balabanov was born on 2 December 1932 in the Greek village called Avranlo in the Georgian SSR.

His father, Anastas Isidorovich Balabanov, worked in Soviet government organizations, while his mother, Sofia Stefanovna Karibova, originates from a family of educators.

In 1950, he graduated from the Bolnisi Secondary School with a gold medal. In 1954, he graduated with honors from the Faculty of Physics and Mathematics at the Tbilisi Pedagogical Sulkhan-Saba Orbeliani University.

In 1960, he defended his candidate thesis on the topic Some Issues of Stability of Solutions of Nonlinear Functional Equations.

In 1990, he defended his doctoral thesis on the topic Some Issues of Nonlinear Functional Analysis and Their Applications.

In 1991, he was conferred the academic degree of Doctor of Physical and Mathematical Sciences and the title of professor.

Balabanov taught mathematics at several higher-education institutions. He lectured at the Faculty of Physics of Tbilisi State University, the Tbilisi branch of the Russian University of Cooperation, the Tbilisi Institute for Teacher Enhancement, the Tbilisi Institute of Economics and Pedagogy, the Aristotle University of Thessaloniki, and the Tbilisi University of Economic Relations.

While living and working in Georgia, Vladimir Balabanov was a member of the Qualification Board of Professors for the Award of Academic Titles and a member of the Board of the Union of Mathematicians of Georgia. By the decree of the President of Georgia Eduard Shevardnadze, he was awarded the Order of Honor. He was also elected an academician of the Greek-Georgian International Humanitarian Academy.

Since 2007, he lived with his family in Thessaloniki, Greece.

He was married and had two children.

== Scientific work ==
His primary works were in the field of nonlinear functional analysis and its applications in calculus of variations, the theory of differential equations, and approximation theory. Some of his research focused on the stability of solutions and bifurcations of solutions of nonlinear operator equations.

He authored more than 70 scientific papers and monographs.

=== Key scientific publications ===
- Vladimir Balabanov. Some Issues of Nonlinear Functional Analysis and Their Applications. Tbilisi: Metznpereba Publishing, 1982.
- Vladimir Balabanov. On the Conditional Minimum of a Functional in Topological Vector Spaces // Proceedings of the Tbilisi Mathematical Institute. 1969. No. 36. pp. 5–28.
- Vladimir Balabanov. On Differential Equations in Locally Convex Spaces // Proceedings of Pedagogical Institutes. Georgian SSR Series: Physics and Mathematics. 1978. No. 4. pp. 36–45.
- Vladimir Balabanov. On the Dependence of Solutions of Differential Equations on Perturbations of Initial Conditions and the Right-Hand Side // Proceedings of Pedagogical Institutes. Georgian SSR Series: Physics and Mathematics. 1980. No. 8;
- Vladimir Balabanov. Filter Structures and Differentiation Operations // Proceedings of the Tbilisi State Pedagogical University named after S. S. Orbeliani. 1997. No. 1. pp. 198–207.
- Vladimir Balabanov. On Topologies Generated by Filter Systems // Proceedings of the Tbilisi State Pedagogical University named after S. S. Orbeliani. 1999. 5. pp. 225–230.
- Vladimir Balabanov. Differentiation of Mappings in Infinite-Dimensional Vector Spaces // Moscow: URSS: KomKniga, 2006. - ISBN 5-484-00384-9

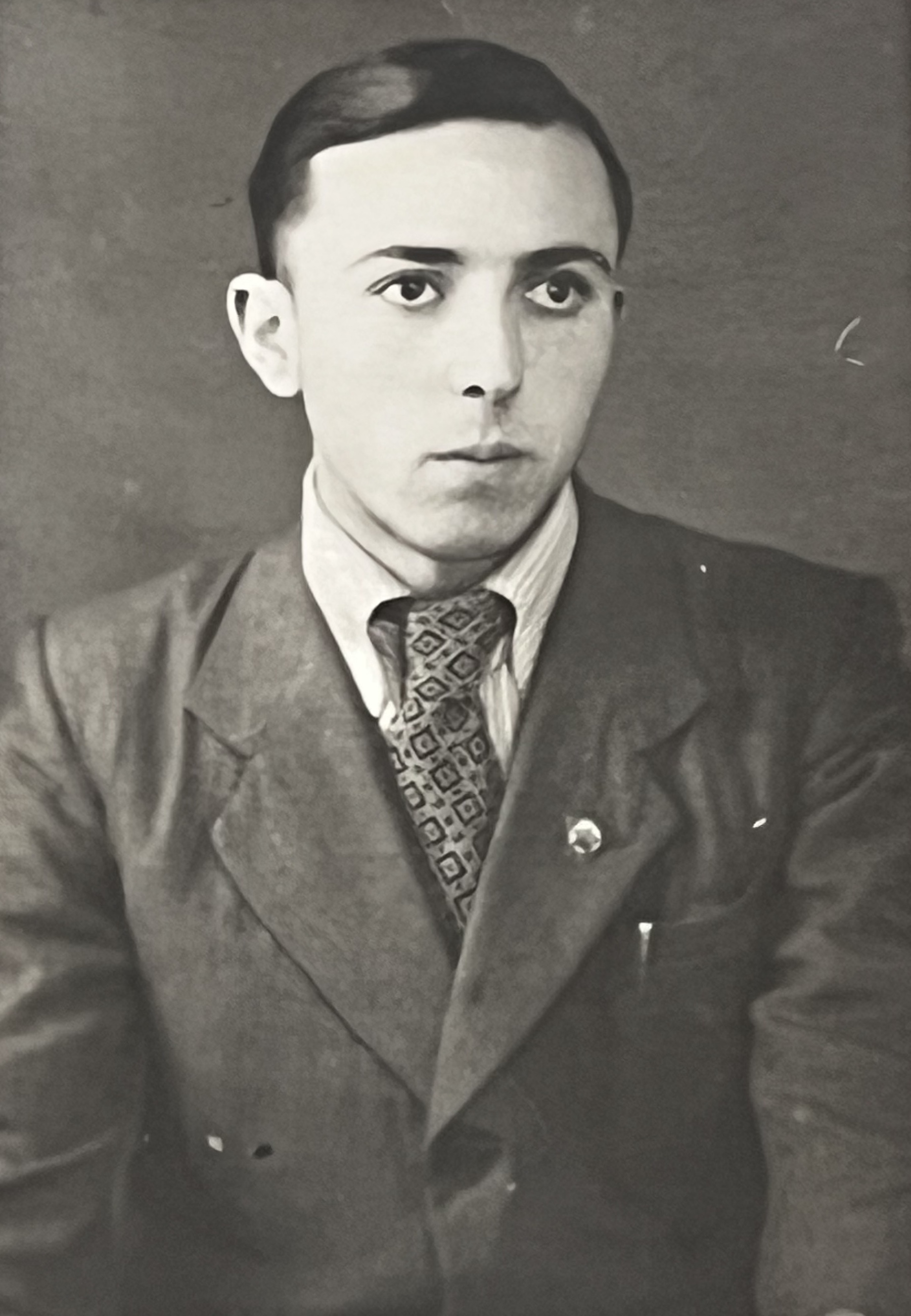
Vladimir Balabanov in his youth

Scientific achievements were highly appreciated by prominent Soviet scientists of the 20th century, such as Anatoly Skorokhod, Vladilen Trenogin, and Boris Pshenichny.
