= RT RNA motifs =

Biotechnology category

RT RNA motifs refers to conserved RNA motifs discovered by bioinformatics and that are usually or always located nearby to genes predicted to encode reverse transcriptase (RT genes). Known RNAs located nearby to RT genes include self-splicing introns, retrons and diversity-generating retroelements (DGR), and RT RNA motifs could function as part of such elements.

Nineteen RT RNA motifs found and named RT-1 through RT-19. The RT-10 RNA motif occurs in a known DGR in Bordetella phage BPP-1. However, the function of these RNAs and their role in the DGR remains unknown. Most RT RNA motifs to date appear too small to be likely to function as self-splicing RNAs.
