= Seth Shipman =

American scientist (born 1983)

Seth Shipman (born 1983) is an American scientist. Shipman is an assistant professor at the Gladstone Institutes and the University of California, San Francisco, where he researches synthetic biology, genetics, and neuroscience.

== Education ==
He holds a B.A. in neuroscience from Wesleyan University, and a PhD in neuroscience from UCSF. After receiving his PhD, Shipman branched out from neuroscience to learn techniques from the fields of genetics and biotechnology, completing his postdoctoral studies at Harvard Medical School in the lab of geneticist George Church.

== Career ==
Shipman opened his lab at UCSF and the Gladstone Institutes in 2019 with a focus on building new molecular technology to help study and treat human disease. Shipman is affiliated with the Bioengineering graduate program at UCSF and UC Berkeley, as well as the Neuroscience and Biomedical Sciences graduate programs at UCSF.

== Research ==
Shipman is best known for his work on the "molecular recorder," a system that he created along with colleague Jeff Nivala that uses CRISPR integrases inside cells to record the timing of molecular events by writing data onto DNA, which can then be read out through sequencing. In an article published in Nature, Shipman and Nivala demonstrated the fidelity of this system to record chronological events over time by encoding within a cell a GIF of one of the first movies ever created, Eadweard Muybridge's 1878 The Horse in Motion. After sequencing, Shipman and Nivala were able to play the GIF of the horse back. This work was featured in The New York Times, the Los Angeles Times, The Guardian, and The Atlantic. The New York Times described this work as "perhaps [the] most astonishing example of the genome's potential as a vast storage device." The molecular recording work has also been featured as part of an art gallery installation and in a film about Muybridge.

In a pre-print published in 2021, Shipman built on the molecular recording technology work and showed that by incorporating a biological element known as a retron, the system can be used to record the timing of transcriptional events. His lab also uses retrons to precisely edit bacterial, fungal, and mammalian genomes.

Shipman's neuroscience work focused primarily on neuroligin, a cell adhesion protein that plays a role in synaptic formation.

== Most cited articles ==
- Shipman SL, Nivala J, Macklis JD, Church GM. CRISPR–Cas encoding of a digital movie into the genomes of a population of living bacteria. Nature. 2017 Jul;547(7663):345-9. (Cited 2599 times, according to Google Scholar)
- Shipman SL, Nivala J, Macklis JD, Church GM. Molecular recordings by directed CRISPR spacer acquisition. Science. 2016 Jul 29;353(6298).(Cited 170 times, according to Google Scholar.)
- Busskamp V, Lewis NE, Guye P, Ng AH, Shipman SL, Byrne SM, Sanjana NE, Murn J, Li Y, Li S, Stadler M. Rapid neurogenesis through transcriptional activation in human stem cells. Molecular systems biology. 2014 Nov;10(11):760.(Cited 166 times, according to Google Scholar.)
- Bemben MA, Shipman SL, Nicoll RA, Roche KW. The cellular and molecular landscape of neuroligins. Trends in neurosciences. 2015 Aug 1;38(8):496-505. (Cited 122 times, according to Google Scholar.)

== Awards ==
Shipman received the NIH Director's New Innovator Award in 2020, the Pew Scholars award in 2020, and the SFARI Bridge to Independence Award in 2017. As a postdoc, Shipman was a Shurl and Kay Curci Fellow of the Life Science Research Foundation.
