= Phageome =

Collection of bacteriophages found in a particular environment

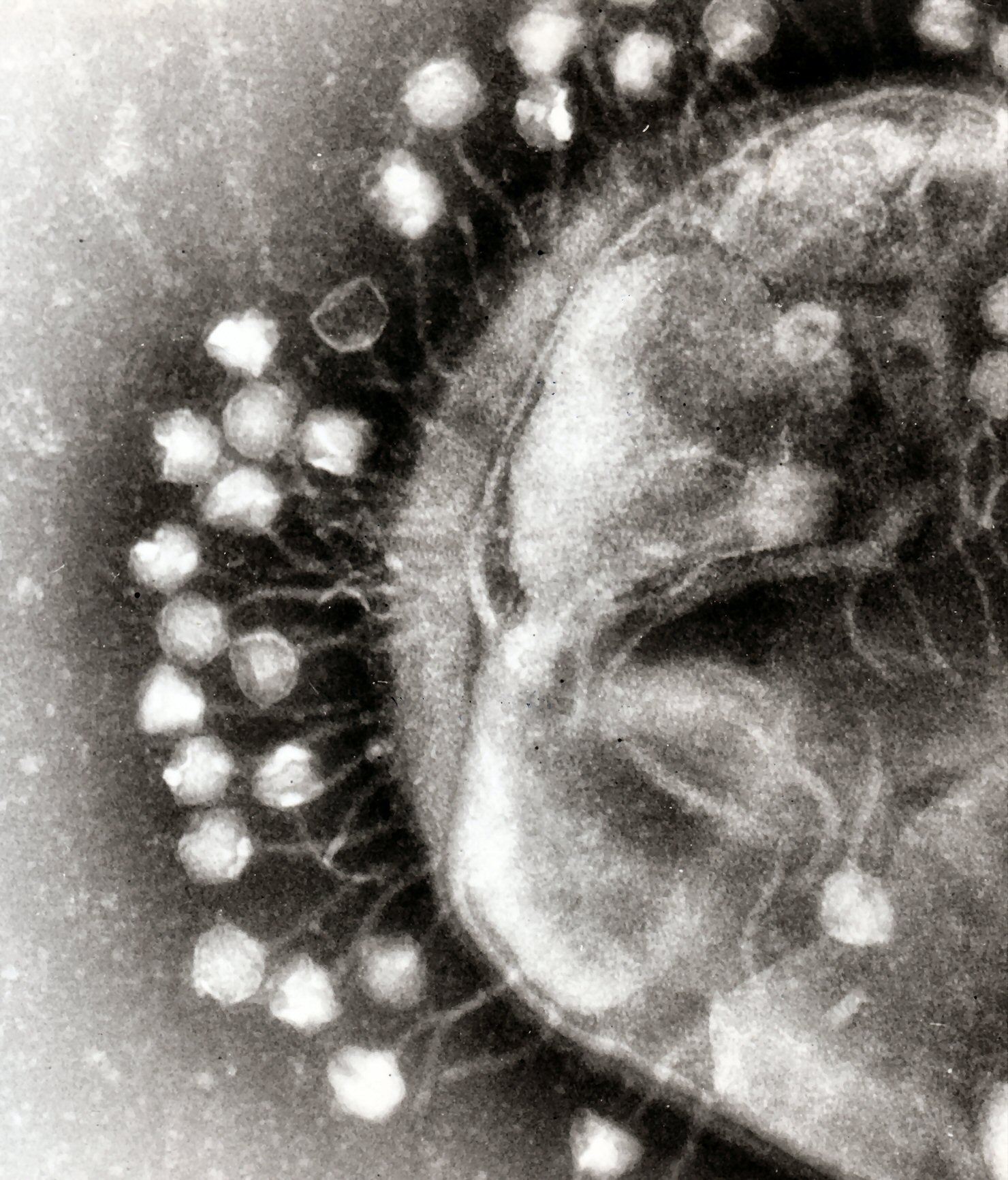
Transmission electron micrograph of multiple bacteriophages attached to a bacterial cell wall

A phageome is a community of bacteriophages and their metagenomes localized in a particular environment, similar to a microbiome. Phageome is a subcategory of virome, which is all of the viruses that are associated with a host or environment. The term was first used in an article by Modi et al. in 2013 and has continued to be used in scientific articles that relate to bacteriophages and their metagenomes. A bacteriophage, or phage for short, is a virus that can infect bacteria and archaea, and can replicate inside of them. Phages make up the majority of most viromes and are currently understood as being the most abundant organism. Oftentimes scientists will look only at a phageome instead of a virome while conducting research. Variations due to many factors have also been explored such as diet, age, and geography. The phageome has been studied in humans in connection with a wide range of disorders of the human body, including IBD, IBS, and colorectal cancer.

== In humans ==
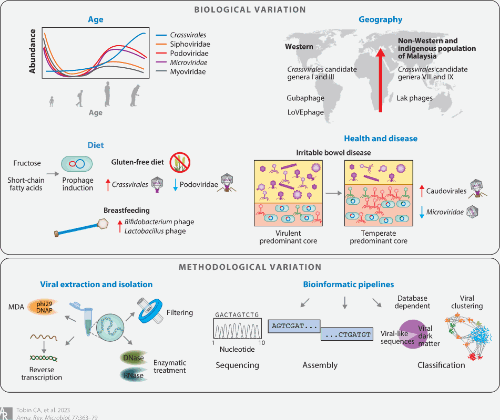
Chart demonstrating variations in the phageome as seen due to age, disease, diet and methodological choices in research.

Although bacteriophages cannot infect human cells, they are found in abundance in the human virome. Phageome research in humans has largely focused on the gut, however it is also being investigated in other areas like the skin, blood, and mouth. The composition of phages that make up a healthy human gut phageome is currently debated, since different methods of research can lead to different results. At birth, the human phageome, and the overall virome in general, is almost non-existent. The human phageome is thought to be brought about in newborns through prophage induction of bacteria passed on from the mother vaginally during birth. However, phages can be introduced through breastfeeding, made evident through studies finding near-exact matches of crAssphage sequences between mother and child. Variations in the human gut phageome continue across the lifespan. Siphoviridae and Myoviridae are the most abundant in infants, and their numbers wane into childhood, whereas Crassvirales dominate in adults. The phageome can also experience changes as a result of diet, which can introduce new phages present in our foods. For example, in those with gluten-free diets, crAssphage were noted in higher abundance along with decreases in the families of Podoviridae. Global geographical differences in phageome composition have been noted, with further variation found within individuals living in rural and urban locations. For instance, residents in Hong Kong, China, were found to have less phages associated with targeting pathogenic bacteria in comparison to those in Yunnan province. Furthermore, residing for longer periods of time in urban regions correlated with increases of Lactobacillus and Lactococcus phages.

=== In disease ===
Changes in the phageome have been seen in various disorders affecting the human body. In the gut, unique changes in the phageome have been described in both inflammatory bowel disease and irritable bowel syndrome. Even further specific changes exist in subtypes of the two disorders. IBS subtypes of IBS-D and IBS-C saw increases in different species belonging to Microviridae and Myoviridae. In Ulcerative colitis and Crohn's disease, which are subtypes of IBD, differences in levels of Caudovirales richness and species have been found. Furthermore, phages that target Acinetobacter have been found in the blood of patients with Crohn's disease. This is thought to occur due to the compromised, inflamed gut barrier allowing for bacteriophage transfer. In the mouth, periodontitis has been associated with Myoviridae residing under the gums along with a currently unspecified bacteriophage in the Siphoviridae family. Phageome changes have also been described in metabolic disorders including type-1 diabetes, type-2 diabetes and metabolic syndrome. In type-1 diabetes, overall shifts have been seen in Myoviridae and Podoviridae. The genome of bacteriophages residing in the gut in Type-2 diabetes patients have been shown to contain numerous genes implicated in disease development. Total phage representation in the virome is higher in individuals with Cardiovascular disease than healthy controls, totaling 63% and 18% respectively. Lastly, researchers studying Colorectal cancer have observed increased richness in a variety of phage genera, with the most notable differences seen in Inovirus and Tunalikevirus.

== See also ==
- Virosphere
