= 186 =

186 may also refer to:

- 186 (number)
- AD 186
- 186 BC
- 186 (New Jersey bus)
- 186 Celuta
- UFC 186
- Kosmos 186
- Intel 186
- Bundesstraße 186
- Escherichia virus 186
- Lectionary 186
- Radical 186

== See also ==
- 186th (disambiguation)
