= Viriome =

Complete assemblage of viruses in a given place and time

The viriome of a habitat or environment is the total virus content within it. A viriome may relate to the viruses that inhabit a multicellular organism as well as the phages that are residing inside bacteria and archaea.

This term exists in contrast to the virome, which more commonly refers to the collection of nucleic acids contained by viruses in a microbiome.

== See also ==
- Human virome
- Non-cellular life
- Microbiology
- Metagenomics
