= Micreos =

Micreos BV
- Industry: Biotechnology
- Founded: 2005
- Founders: Mark Offerhaus & Hans-Poul Veldhuyzen van Zanten
- Headquarters: Netherlands
- Products: Listex; Salmonelex; Staphefekt Products
- Number of employees: 50-200

Micreos BV is a Netherlands-based phage- and endolysin technology development company. The company is the developer of Staphefekt, an endolysin that selectively kills Staphylococcus aureus bacteria. The substance is an ingredient in the firm's skincare brand Gladskin which targets inflammatory skin conditions.

Micreos BV has developed phage- and endolysin-based products against specific bacteria such as Listeria, Salmonella and MRSA. Listex is their antimicrobial processing aid used to prevent Listeria in food products including meat, fish and cheese. The USDA, Health Canada, and FSANZ have approved these uses. Salmonelex, aimed at prevention of cross contamination and the killing of undesirable Salmonella bacteria on food during processing - has been approved as a GRAS processing aid by the FDA.
