= Escherichia virus G4 =

Bacteriophage G4

Virus classification
- (unranked): Virus
- Realm: Monodnaviria
- Kingdom: Sangervirae
- Phylum: Phixviricota
- Class: Malgrandaviricetes
- Order: Petitvirales
- Family: Microviridae
- Genus: Gequatrovirus
- Species: Gequatrovirus G4

Species of virus

Escherichia virus G4 is a bacteriophage that infects E. coli. First isolated in 1973, the phage was originally isolated from samples of raw sewage and has 5,577 nucleotides. Its isometric capsid contains a single-stranded circular genome of about 5.5 kbp. Phage G4 bears high genetic and structural similarity to the phage ΦX174, though the two phage genomes are up to 39 percent different by sequence.

== Synthetic G4 ==
Synthetic G4 (syn-G4) has the appearance of an icosahedral protein shell and is 50 nm in diameter. has been synthesized through Polymerase Chain Reaction (PCR) assembly of short oligonucleotides. The synthetic phage G4 genomes were effective in E. coli.

== Phage Therapy ==
Urinary Tract Infections (UTIs) are mainly caused by uropathogenic E. coli, and bacteriophage G4 can be used to treat it. The bacteriophage inject their DNA into the bacteria, releasing many new bacteriophages. This process has many benefits:

1. The bacteriophage do not attack animal or human cells, only E. coli bacteria.
2. The bacteriophage reproduce exponentially, so only a small amount is needed.
3. After the bacteriophage have attached and killed all the bacteria, they disperse throughout the body and are harmless.
