= Félix d'Hérelle =

French microbiologist

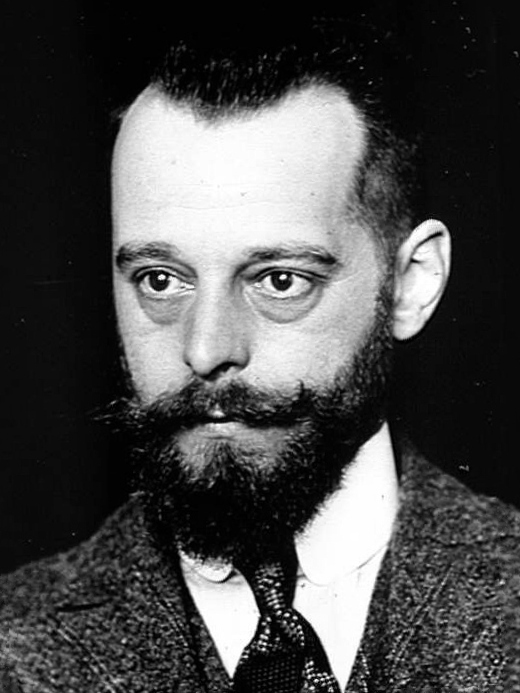
- Born: 25 April 1873; Paris, France
- Died: 22 February 1949 (aged 75); Paris, France
- Education: Lycée Condorcet, Lycée Louis-le-Grand, University of Bonn
- Known for: Discovery of bacteriophages and phage therapy.
- Spouse: Marie Caire
- Father: Hubert Augustin Félix Haerens d'Herelle
- Awards: Honorary doctorate, University of Leiden; Leeuwenhoek Medal (1925)
- Scientific career
- Fields: Microbiology
- Workplaces: General Hospital, Guatemala City; University of Leiden; Pasteur Institute, Paris; Yale University; Tbilisi Institute

Félix d'Hérelle (25 April 1873 – 22 February 1949) was a French microbiologist. He was co-discoverer of bacteriophages (viruses that infect bacteria) and experimented with the possibility of phage therapy. D'Hérelle has also been credited for his contributions to the larger concept of applied microbiology.

d'Hérelle was a self-taught microbiologist. In 1917 he discovered that "an invisible antagonist", when added to bacteria on agar, would produce areas of dead bacteria. The antagonist, now known to be a bacteriophage, could pass through a Chamberland filter. He accurately diluted a suspension of these viruses and discovered that the highest dilutions (lowest virus concentrations), rather than killing all the bacteria, formed discrete areas of dead organisms. Counting these areas and multiplying by the dilution factor allowed him to calculate the number of viruses in the original suspension. He realised that he had discovered a new form of virus and later coined the term "bacteriophage". Between 1918 and 1921 d'Hérelle discovered different types of bacteriophages that could infect several other species of bacteria including Vibrio cholerae. Bacteriophages were heralded as a potential treatment for diseases such as typhoid and cholera, but their promise was forgotten with the development of penicillin. Since the early 1970s, bacteria have continued to develop resistance to antibiotics such as penicillin, and this has led to a renewed interest in the use of bacteriophages to treat serious infections.

== Biography ==
=== Early years ===
Félix d'Hérelle's place of birth has been debated, but current research has concluded that he was born in France. Félix d'Hérelle's father, Hubert Augustin Félix Haerens d'Herelle, died at the age of 30 when Félix was six years old. From 7 to 17 years of age, d'Hérelle attended school in Paris, including the Lycée Condorcet and Lycée Louis-le-Grand high schools. In the fall of 1891, d'Hérelle traveled to Bonn, Germany where he attended lectures at the University of Bonn for several months. Between the ages of 16 and 24, d'Hérelle traveled extensively via money given by his mother. At 16, he started to travel through western Europe by bike. At 17, after finishing school, he traveled through South America. Afterwards, he continued his travels through Europe, including Turkey, where he, at 20, met his wife, Marie Caire.

At 24, now the father of a daughter, d'Hérelle and his family moved to Canada. He built a home laboratory and studied microbiology from books and his own experiments. Through the influence of a friend of his late father, he earned a commission from the Canadian government to study the fermentation and distillation of maple syrup to schnapps. His father's friend pointed out that Pasteur "made a good beginning by studying fermentations, so it might be interesting to you, too." He also worked as a medic for a geological expedition, even though he had no medical degree or real experience. Together with his brother, he invested almost all his money in a chocolate factory, which soon went bankrupt. During this period, d'Hérelle published his first scientific paper, "De la formation du carbone par les végétaux" in the May 1901 issue of Le Naturaliste Canadien. d'Hérelle contended in the paper that the results of his experiments indicated that carbon was a compound, not an element.

=== Guatemala and Mexico ===
With his money almost gone and his second daughter born, he took a contract with the government of Guatemala as a bacteriologist at the General Hospital in Guatemala City. Some of his work included organizing defenses against the dread diseases of the time: malaria and yellow fever. He also studied a local fungal infection of coffee plants, and discovered that acidifying the soil could serve as an effective treatment. As a side job, he was asked to find a way to make whiskey from bananas. Life in the rough and dangerous environment of the country was hard on his family, but d'Hérelle, always adventurer at heart, rather enjoyed working close to "real life", compared to the sterile environments of a "civilized" clinic. He later stated that his scientific path began on this occasion.

In 1907, he took an offer from the Mexican government to continue his studies on fermentation. He and his family moved to a sisal plantation near Mérida, Yucatán. Disease struck at him and his family, but in 1909, he had successfully established a method to produce sisal schnapps.

=== Return to France ===
Machines for mass production of sisal schnapps were ordered in Paris, where he oversaw the machines' construction. Meanwhile, in his spare time, he worked for free in a laboratory at the Pasteur Institute. He was soon offered the job of running the new Mexican plant, but declined, considering it "too boring". He did, however, take the time to attempt stopping a locust plague at the plantation using their own diseases. He extracted bacteria pathogenic to locusts from their guts. This innovative approach to locust plagues anticipated modern biological pest control using Bacillus thuringiensis also known as Bt.

D'Hérelle and his family finally moved to Paris in early 1911, where he worked again as an unpaid assistant in a lab at the Pasteur Institute. He got attention in the scientific community the same year, when the results of his successful attempt to counter the Mexican locust plague with Coccobacillus were published.

=== Argentina ===
At the end of the year, restless d'Hérelle was again on the road, this time in Argentina, where he was offered a chance to test these results on a much larger scale. Thus, in 1912 and 1913, he fought the Argentinian locust plagues with coccobacillus experiments. Even though Argentina claimed his success was inconsistent, he himself declared it a full success, and was subsequently invited to other countries to demonstrate the method.

=== France and phages ===
During World War I, d'Hérelle and assistants (his wife and daughters among them) produced over 12 million doses of medication for the allied military. At this point in history, medical treatments were primitive, compared to today's standards. The smallpox vaccine, developed by Edward Jenner, was one of the few vaccines available. The primary antibiotic was the arsenic-based salvarsan against syphilis, with severe side effects. Common treatments were based mercury, strychnine, and cocaine. As a result, in 1900, the average life span was 45 years, and World War I did not change that to the better.

In 1915, British bacteriologist Frederick W. Twort discovered a small agent that infects and kills bacteria, but did not pursue the issue further. Independently, the discovery of "an invisible, antagonistic microbe of the dysentery bacillus" by d'Hérelle was announced on 3 September 1917. The isolation of phages by d'Herelle works like this:

1. Nutritional medium is infected with bacteria; the medium turns opaque.
2. The bacteria are infected with phages and die, producing new phages; the medium clears.
3. The medium is filtered through porcelain filter, holding back bacteria and larger objects; only the smaller phages pass through.

In early 1919, d'Hérelle isolated phages from chicken feces, successfully treating a plague of chicken typhoid with them. After this successful experiment on chicken, he felt ready for the first trial on humans. The first patient was healed of dysentery using phage therapy in August 1919. Many more followed.

At the time, none, not even d'Hérelle, knew exactly what a phage was. D'Hérelle claimed that it was a biological organism that reproduces, somehow feeding off bacteria. Others, the Nobelist Jules Bordet chief among them, theorized that phages were inanimate chemicals, enzymes specifically, that were already present in bacteria, and only trigger the release of similar proteins, killing the bacteria in the process. Due to this uncertainty, and d'Hérelle using phages without much hesitation on humans, his work was under constant attack from many other scientists. It was not until the first phage was observed under an electron microscope by Helmut Ruska in 1939 that its true nature was established.

In 1920, d'Hérelle travelled to Indochina, pursuing studies of cholera and the plague, from where he returned at the end of the year. D'Hérelle, officially still an unpaid assistant, found himself without a lab; d'Hérelle later claimed this was a result of a quarrel with the assistant director of the Pasteur Institute, Albert Calmette. The biologist Edouard Pozerski had mercy on d'Hérelle and lent him a stool (literally) in his laboratory. In 1921, he managed to publish a monograph, The Bacteriophage: Its Role in Immunity about his works as an official Institute publication, by tricking Calmette. During the following year, doctors and scientists across western Europe took a heightened interest in phage therapy, successfully testing it against a variety of diseases. Since bacteria become resistant against a single phage, d'Herelle suggested using "phage cocktails" containing different phage strains.

Phage therapy soon became a boom, and a great hope in medicine. In 1924, 25 January, d'Hérelle received the honorary doctorate of the University of Leiden, as well as the Leeuwenhoek medal, which is only awarded once every ten years. The latter was especially important to him, as his idol Louis Pasteur received the same medal in 1895. The next year, he was nominated eight times for the Nobel Prize, though he was never awarded one.

=== Egypt ===
After holding a temporary position at the University of Leiden, d'Hérelle got a position with the Conseil Sanitaire, Maritime et Quarantenaire d'Egypte in Alexandria. The Conseil was put in place to prevent plague and cholera spreading to Europe, with special emphasis on the sanitary concerns about muslim pilgrim groups returning from Mecca and Medina.

=== India ===
D'Hérelle then used phages he collected from plague-infected rats during his 1920 visit to Indochina on human plague patients, with claimed success. The British Empire initiated a vast campaign against plague based on his results.

In 1926, the British government in India requested anti-plague phages for trials at the Haffkine Institute. The Institute had trouble maintaining the phages. D'Hérelle took unpaid leave from the Quarantine board of Egypt and went to Bombay at his own expense.

The Haffkine Institute had not used Martin's medium, which included macerated pig stomach and beef muscle that would offend Muslims and Hindus. The institute's medium used a hydrochloric acid digest of goat tissue. D'Hérelle solved the problem by digestion with papaya juice (a source of papain).

Thereafter Lt Col J. Morison, acting director of the Haffkine Institute, became convinced of the effectiveness of phages. Morison wrote to the Government of India to invite d'Hérelle noting that he was "a consummate technician, and a "most inspiring worker."

D'Hérelle returned to India to work on cholera. He collaborated with the assistant director of the Haffkine Institute, Major Reginald Malone and M.N. Lahiri, who conducted experiments at the Campbell Hospital in Calcutta. The Campbell Hospital team also worked with Russian bacteriologist Igor Nicholas Asheshov (1891–1961), who was working in Patna. Experiments were conducted both in hospitals and in the field.

D'Hérelle and co-workers added phages to wells near camps crowded with many pilgrims. Cases of cholera in the camps were subsequently much lower. The phages were distributed to village head men in Assam and Bengal along with instructions.

However, this was a period when Gandhi's Satyagraha was leading to non-cooperation by Indians. Many of the head men did not collaborate and fewer still reported back on the effectiveness. As a result, the experiment was disbanded in 1937.

=== United States and commercial failures ===
D'Hérelle refused a request the following year by the British government to work in India, as he had been offered a professorship at Yale University, which he accepted. Meanwhile, European and US pharmaceutical companies had taken up the production of their own phage medicine, and were promising impossible benefits.

To counteract this trend, d'Hérelle agreed to co-found a French phage-producing company, piping the money back into phage research. All of the companies suffered from production problems, as results from commercial phage medicine were erratic.

Production problems were most likely due to the attempt to mass-produce phages when they were barely understood. The phages may have been damaged and/or too low in concentration. Another possibility is that incorrect diagnoses led to the use of the irrelevant types of phages that were not adapted to the host bacteria of interest. Many studies on the proposed healing effects of phages were also poorly designed and conducted.

This situation led to many influential members of the scientific community turning against d'Hérelle. The problems may have been compounded by d'Hérelle's reputed bad temper, which was said to have made enemies of several other scientists.

=== Soviet Union ===
In about 1934, d'Hérelle went to Tbilisi, Georgia. He was welcomed to the Soviet Union as a hero, bringing knowledge of salvation from diseases ravaging the eastern states. He was even awarded with an honorary doctorate from Tbilisi State University in 1934.

D'Hérelle may have accepted Stalin's invitation for two reasons. Firstly, he was said to be enamored with communism. Secondly, d'Hérelle was happy to be working with his friend, Professor George Eliava, founder of the Tbilisi Institute, in 1923. Eliava had become friendly with d'Hérelle during a visit to the Pasteur Institute in Paris in 1926, and had used that occasion to learn about phages.

D'Hérelle worked at the Tbilisi Institute off and on for about a year. He even dedicated one of his books to Comrade Stalin: "The Bacteriophage and the Phenomenon of Recovery," written and published in Tbilisi in 1935. Indeed, d'Hérelle may have planned to take up permanent residence in Tbilisi, as he had started to build a cottage on the grounds of the institute. The same building would later house the Georgian headquarters of the NKVD.

Fortunes turned abruptly for d'Hérelle when Eliava fell in love with the same woman as Lavrenty Beria, head of the secret police. Eliava was executed and denounced as an enemy of the people during one of Stalin's purges. As a result, d'Hérelle fled Tbilisi, never to return. His book was banned from distribution.

The Georgian period in d'Hérelle's career has been investigated by author and medical scientist David Shrayer-Petrov.

=== Final return to France ===
Phage therapy boomed, despite all problems, driven by the military on both sides in an effort to keep the troops safe, at least from infections. D'Hérelle could not really enjoy this development; he was kept under house arrest by the German "Wehrmacht" in Vichy, France. He used the time to write his book "The Value of Experiment", as well as his memoirs, the latter being 800 pages in length.

After D-Day, the new antibiotic drug penicillin became public knowledge and found its way into the hospitals in the west. As it was more reliable and easier to use than phage therapy, it soon became the method of choice, despite side effects and problems with resistant bacteria. Phage therapy remained a common treatment in the states of the Soviet Union, though, until its deconstruction.

Félix d'Hérelle was stricken with pancreatic cancer and died a forgotten man in Paris in 1949. He was buried in Saint-Mards-en-Othe in the department of the Aube in France.

In the 1960s Félix d'Hérelle's name appeared on a list published by the Nobel Foundation of scientists who had been worthy of receiving the Nobel Prize but did not, for one reason or another. D'Herelle was nominated for the prize ten times.

== Legacy ==
D'Hérelle became widely known for his imaginative approaches to important problems in theoretical, as well as applied, microbiology. At the same time, he was widely reviled for his self-advertisement, his exaggerated claims of success and his sharp financial practices. He also had a talent for making enemies among powerful senior scientists.

D'Hérelle's main legacy lies in the use of phage in the molecular revolution in biology. Max Delbrück and the "phage group" used bacteriophages to make the discoveries that led to the origins of molecular biology. Much of the initial work on the nature of genetic expression and its regulation was performed with bacteriophages by Francois Jacob, Andre Lwoff and Jacques Monod. In fact, immediately before his studies of the structure of DNA, James Watson had earned his Ph.D. by working on a bacteriophage-related project in Salvador Luria's laboratory. A more detailed account of the use of phage in major biological discoveries can be found on the page, bacteriophage.

As one of the earliest applied microbiologists, d'Hérelle's microbe-centered worldview has been noted for its prescience, since microbes are playing increasingly important roles in bioremediation, microbial fuel cells, gene therapy, and other areas with relevance to human well-being.

== Namesakes ==
The family Herelleviridae, a group of bacteriophages in order Caudovirales, was named in honor of Félix d'Hérelle.

There is an avenue that bears his name in the 16th arrondissement in Paris.

== Literary note ==
The novel Arrowsmith written by Sinclair Lewis with scientific help from Paul de Kruif was based to a certain extent on the life of d'Hérelle. The novel The French Cottage (Russ. Frantsuzskii kottedzh) by David Shrayer-Petrov deals at length with d'Hérelle's experience in Soviet Georgia.

== Books ==
- 1946. L'étude d'une maladie: Le Choléra. French. F. Rouge & Cie S. A., Lausanne. OCLC 11221115
- 1938. Le Phénomène de la Guérison dans les Maladies Infectieuses. Masson et cie, Paris. OCLC 5784382
  - Russian translation with G. Eliava. 1935. Bakteriofag i fenomen vyzdorovlenija Tiflis Gos. Univ. (Tbilisi National University, Tbilisi, Georgia). OCLC 163085972
  - Georgian translation with G. Eliava. 1935. (cf Summers WC, 1999, page 165)
- 1933. Le Bactériophage et ses Applications Thérapeutiques. Doin, Paris. OCLC 14749145
  - English translation. with G. H. Smith. 1930. The Bacteriophage and its Clinical Application. p. 165–243. Charles C. Thomas, Publisher, Springfield, Illinois. OCLC 347451
- 1929. Études sur le Choléra. Impr. A. Serafini, Alexandrie. OCLC 15864352
  - English translation, with R. H. Malone, and M. N. Lahiri. 1930. Studies on Asiatic Cholera. Thacker, Spink & Co., Calcutta. OCLC 25936856
- 1926. Le Bactériophage et son Comportement. Masson et Cie, Paris. OCLC 11981307
  - English translation, with G. H. Smith. 1926. The Bacteriophage and Its Behavior. The Williams &Wilkins Co., Baltimore. OCLC 2394374
- with G. H. Smith. 1924. Immunity in Natural Infectious Disease. Williams & Wilkins Co., Baltimore. OCLC 586303
- 1923. Les Défenses de l'Organisme. Flammarion, Paris. OCLC 11127665
- 1921. Le bactériophage: Son rôle dans l'immunité. Masson et cie, Paris. OCLC 14794182, Internet Archive
  - German translation, 1922. Der Bakteriophage und seine Bedeutung für die Immunität. F. Vieweg & Sohn, Braunschweig. OCLC 36920828
  - English translation, 1922 The Bacteriophage: Its Role in Immunity. Williams and Wilkins Co./Waverly Press, Baltimore. OCLC 14789160

== Bibliography ==
- Ireland T (29 June 2023). The Good Virus. Hodder & Stoughton. ISBN 978-1-5293-6524-5.
