= Phage-ligand technology =

The Phage-ligand technology is a technology to detect, bind, and remove bacteria and bacterial toxins by using highly specific bacteriophage-derived proteins.

== Origins ==
The host recognition of bacteriophages occurs via bacteria-binding proteins that have strong binding affinities to specific protein or carbohydrate structures on the surface of the bacterial host. At the end of the infection life cycle, the bacteria-lysing Endolysin is synthesized and degrades the bacterial peptidoglycan cell wall, resulting in lysis (and therefore killing) of the bacterial cell.

== Applications ==
Bacteriophage-derived proteins are used for the detection and removal of bacteria and bacterial components (especially endotoxin contaminations) in pharmaceutical and biological products, human diagnostics, food, and decolonization of bacteria causing nosocomial infections (e.g., MRSA). Protein modifications allow the biotechnological adaptation to specific requirements.

== See also ==
- Affinity magnetic separation
