= Immunomagnetic separation =

Immunomagnetic separation (IMS) is a laboratory tool that can efficiently isolate cells out of body fluid or cultured cells. It can also be used as a method of quantifying the pathogenicity of food, blood or feces. DNA analysis have supported the combined use of both this technique and Polymerase Chain Reaction (PCR). Another laboratory separation tool is the affinity magnetic separation (AMS), which is more suitable for the isolation of prokaryotic cells.

IMS deals with the isolation of cells, proteins, and nucleic acids through the specific capture of biomolecules through the attachment of small-magnetized particles, beads, containing antibodies and lectins. These beads are coated to bind to targeted biomolecules, gently separated and goes through multiple cycles of washing to obtain targeted molecules bound to these super paramagnetic beads, which can differentiate based on strength of magnetic field and targeted molecules, are then eluted to collect supernatant and then are able to determine the concentration of specifically targeted biomolecules. IMS obtains certain concentrations of specific molecules within targeted bacteria.

A mixture of cell population will be put into a magnetic field where cells then are attached to super paramagnetic beads, specific example are Dynabeads (4.5-μm), will remain once excess substrate is removed binding to targeted antigen. Dynabeads consists of iron-containing cores, which is covered by a thin layer of a polymer shell allowing the absorption of biomolecules. The beads are coated with primary antibodies, specific-specific antibodies, lectins, enzymes, or streptavidin; the linkage between magnetized beads coated materials are cleavable DNA linker cell separation from the beads when the culturing of cells is more desirable.

Many of these beads have the same principles of separation; however, the presence and different strength s of magnetic fields requires certain sizes of beads, based on the ramifications of the separation of the cell population. The larger sized beads (>2μm) are the most commonly used range that was produced by Dynal (Dynal [UK] Ltd., Wirral, Merseyside, UK; Dynal, Inc., Lake Success, NY). Where as smaller beads (<100 nm) are mostly used for MACS system that was produced by Miltenyi Biotech (Miltenyi Biotech Ltd., Bisley, Surrey, UK; Miltenyi Biotech Inc., Auburn, CA).

Immunomagnetic separation is used in a variety of scientific fields including molecular biology, microbiology, and immunology. (3) This technique of separation does not only consist of separation of cells within the blood, but can also be used for techniques of separation from primary tumors and in metastases research, through separation into component parts, creating a singular-cell delay, then allowing the suitable antibody to label the cell. In metastasis research this separation technique may become necessary to separate when given a cell population and wanting to isolate tumors cells in tumors, peripheral blood, and bone marrow.

== Technique ==
Antibodies coating paramagnetic beads will bind to antigens present on the surface of cells thus capturing the cells and facilitate the concentration of these bead-attached cells. The concentration process is created by a magnet placed on the side of the test tube bringing the beads to it. MACS systems (Magnetic Cell Separation system):

Through the usage of smaller super paramagnetic beads (<100 nm), which requires a stronger magnetic field to separate cells. Cells are labeled with primary antibodies and then MACS beads are coated with specific- specific antibodies. These labeled cell suspension is then put into a separation column in a strong magnetic field. The labeled cells are contained, magnetized, while in the magnetic field and the unlabeled cells are suspended, un-magnetized, to be collected. Once removed from magnetic field positive cells are eluted. These MACS beads are then incorporated by the cells allowing them to remain in the column because they do not intrude with the cell attachment to the culture surface to cell-cell interactions. A bead removal reagent is then applied to have an enzymatically release of the MACS beads allowing those cells to become relabeled with some other marker, which then is sorted.
