= Staphefekt =

Proprietary enzyme used to treat skin infections

Staphefekt is a proprietary enzyme (an endolysin) intended to treat Staphylococcus aureus skin infections in humans. It is developed and produced by the Dutch biotechnology company Micreos. It became the first commercially available endolysin and is marketed in Gladskin products.

The enzyme has been shown to be effective in killing S. aureus strains resistant to antibiotics such as MRSA. The enzyme has successfully been used for treatment of S. aureus-related dermatosis.
