= Escherichia virus 186 =

Virus classification
- (unranked): Virus
- Realm: Duplodnaviria
- Kingdom: Heunggongvirae
- Phylum: Uroviricota
- Class: Caudoviricetes
- Family: Peduoviridae
- Genus: Eganvirus
- Species: Escherichia virus 186

Species of virus

Escherichia virus 186 is a virus of the family Myoviridae, genus Eganvirus.

As a member of the group I of the Baltimore classification, Escherichia virus 186 is a dsDNA virus. According to its family, Myoviridae, its morphology is nonenveloped and consist of a head and a tail separated by a neck and its genome is linear. The propagation of the virions includes the attaching to a host cell (a bacterium, as Escherichia virus 186 is a bacteriophage) and the injection of the double stranded DNA; the host transcribes and translates it to manufacture new particles. To replicate its genetic content requires host cell DNA polymerases and, hence, the process is highly dependent on the cell cycle.

== Use as a model system ==
Bacteriophage 186 has been studied as a model system for biological switches. The phage can enter two developmental lifecycles called the lytic cycle and lysogeny and knowledge into how the decision between the two developmental routes may extend to other biological systems.

Bacteriophage 186 is often compared to the more extensively studied lambda phage as both their prophages respond to DNA damage in the host, more commonly known as the SOS response, even though the two bacteriophages are evolutionarily distinct.
