= George Eliava =

Georgian microbiologist

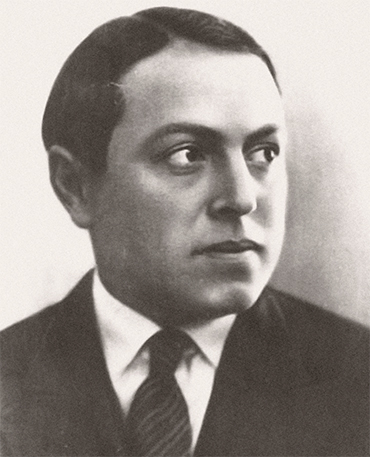
- Born: 13 January 1892; Sachkhere, Kutais Governorate, Russian Empire
- Died: 10 July 1937 (aged 45); Tbilisi, Georgian SSR, Soviet Union
- Education: Novorossiysk University, Geneva, Moscow University
- Known for: Bacteriophages, Phage therapy
- Scientific career
- Fields: Microbiology
- Workplaces: Bacteriological laboratories in Trabzon and Tbilisi, Pasteur Institute

George Eliava (Georgian: გიორგი ელიავა; 13 January 1892 – 10 July 1937) was a Georgian-Soviet microbiologist who worked with bacteriophages (viruses that infect bacteria).

Eliava was born in Sachkhere. From 1909 to 1912 he studied medicine, at Novorossiysk University, continued his studies in Geneva until 1914, and graduated at Moscow University in 1916. The same year, he became head of the bacteriological laboratory in Trabzon, in 1917 he headed the bacteriological laboratory in Tbilisi. In 1918–1921, and again in 1926–1927, he worked at the Pasteur Institute in Paris, where he met Félix d'Hérelle, the co-discoverer of bacteriophages. Eliava got excited about the potential of bacteriophages in medical applications, and brought the research (and, eventually, d'Hérelle), to Tbilisi.

In 1923, Eliava founded a bacteriological institute in Tbilisi on the basis of the laboratory he headed since 1921, to research and promote phage therapy. After his death, the institute was renamed George Eliava Institute in 1988. Since 1927, Eliava held the chair for hygiene at the medical faculty of Tbilisi, and since 1929 the chair for microbiology. In 1934, the Tbilisi Black Death Centre was founded and headed by Eliava.

In 1937, Eliava was arrested and (together with his wife) executed as a "People's Enemy", either for being an intellectual or for competing for a woman with Lavrenti Beria, chief of the secret police to Joseph Stalin.
