= George Eliava Institute =

Phage therapy center in Tbilisi, Georgia

Coordinates: 41°44′03″N 44°46′19″E

George Eliava Institute of Bacteriophage, Microbiology and Virology
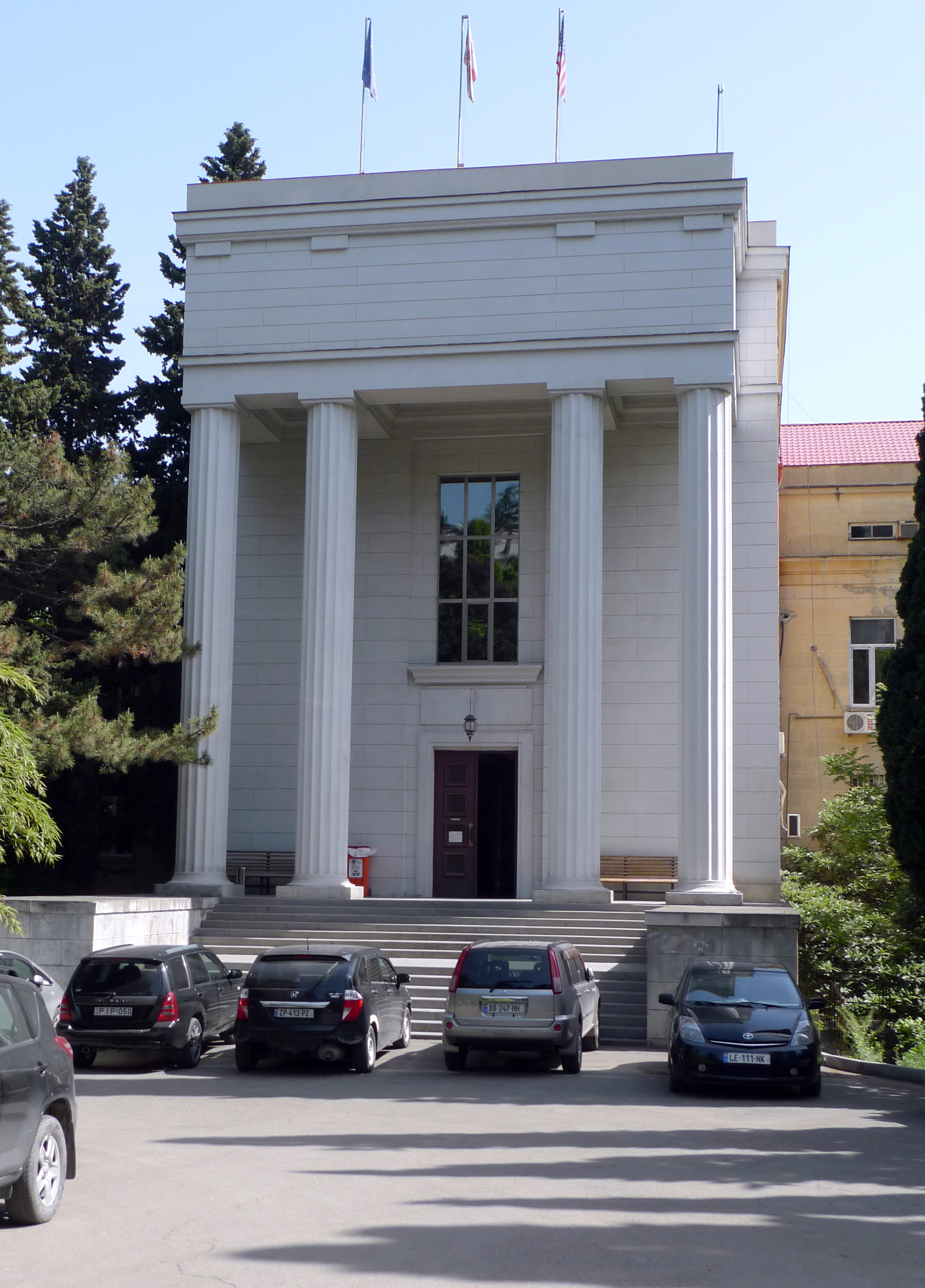
- Frontview of the George Eliava Institute, Tbilisi
- Established: 1916
- Director: Mzia Kutateladze
- Location: Eliava IBMV, 3, Gotua str., Tbilisi, Georgia
- Website: www.eliava-institute.org

The George Eliava Institute of Bacteriophage, Microbiology and Virology (aka Tbilisi Institute) has been active since the 1930s in the field of phage therapy, which is used to combat microbial infection (cf. antibiotic-resistant strains).

== History ==
The institute was opened in Tbilisi, Georgia in 1923, and was a bacteriology laboratory. Its founder, Prof. George Eliava, was not aware of bacteriophages until 1919–1921. In those years he met Felix d'Herelle during a visit to the Pasteur Institute in Paris. There, Eliava was enthusiastic about the potential of phages in the curing of bacterial disease, and invited d'Herelle to visit his laboratory in Georgia.

D'Herelle visited Tbilisi twice in 1933–34, and agreed to work with Prof. Eliava. It has been suggested that d'Herelle became enamored of the communist idea. In 1934, Joseph Stalin invited d'Herelle to the institute in Tbilisi; he accepted and worked there for about 18 months. D'Herelle dedicated one of his books to Stalin, The Bacteriophage and the Phenomenon of Cure, written and published in Tbilisi in 1935.

However, the collaboration between the two scientists was not to be. Around the time d'Herelle was to take up residence, in 1937 George Eliava was executed and denounced as an enemy of the people. D'Herelle returned to France. He never was allowed to come back to Georgia by the Soviets. D'Herelle's book was also banned from distribution.

In spite of this development, the institute did not change its practical specialization, and continued its activity in the field of bacteriophage research. In 1938, the Institute of Bacteriophage Research and the Institute of Microbiology & Epidemiology (founded separately in 1936) merged, and the Institute of Microbiology, Epidemiology and Bacteriophage was formed. It existed until 1951 and was authorized by the People's Commissary of Health of Georgia. After 1951, it came under the auspices of the All-Union Ministry of Health and was renamed The Institute of Vaccine and Sera.

Since its inception, the institute was composed of a combination of industrial and scientific (research) departments. In 1988 the institute was rearranged again and emerged as the Scientific Industrial Union "Bacteriophage" (SIU "Bacteriophage"). Around that time, its scientific portion was renamed the George Eliava Research Institute of Bacteriophage.

Based on the original intentions of D'Herelle and Eliava, the Bacteriophage Institute retained its leadership among other institutes of similar profile over the years. Teimuraz Chanishvili was the leader of the scientific part of the institute for over 30 years, until his death in August 2007.

== The institute behind the Iron Curtain ==
The institute in Tbilisi became a general Soviet institute for the development and production of bacteriophage drugs. Patients with serious infectious diseases came from all over the Soviet Union to receive treatments there. Bacteriophages became a routine part of treatment in clinics and hospitals. Ointments for the skin, and pills, drops, and rinses consisting of phages were sold and are still sold at pharmacies throughout Eastern Europe at low prices.

After the Republic of Georgia declined to join the Russian Federation and the Georgian Civil War broke out in 1991, the Tbilisi facility was essentially ruined. The Eliava Institute's facilities were damaged and decades of research on bacteriophage nearly went down the drain. Thousands of bacteriophage samples identified over the years and catalogued in huge, refrigerated "libraries" suffered irreversible damage due to frequent electrical outages. Apparently, the Russians transferred some of the equipment to their territory and built plants for the production of bacteriophages in other locations. Clearly, they recognized the importance of the research and also that of continued bacteriophage therapy. The situation at the Eliava Institute continued to deteriorate until it was on the verge of closure.

However, in 1997, a report on the institute was broadcast by the BBC, sparking a flurry of media interest in the West. The headlines drew doctors and scientists to Tbilisi - and also, most importantly, energetic entrepreneurs from around the world who were determined to help save the institute and its stocks and fully explore the potential of this "new" and highly effective therapy. Georgian scientists whose names were connected in some way to the institute saw great opportunity, and some of them emigrated to the West to be part of joint projects. Some of the institute's projects with the rest of the world can be seen on the website of the Georgian Academy of Sciences, the umbrella entity which now includes the Eliava Institute.

Mzia Kutateladze is a present director of the Eliava Institute.

== Laboratories ==
The Institute includes the following laboratories: Laboratory of Physiology of Microorganisms, Laboratory of Biochemistry, Laboratory of Morphology of Bacteriophages, Laboratory of Immunology (includes the group of Virology), Laboratory of Standardization and Deposing of Bacteriophages (includes the group of Brucella and Anaerobic Bacteriophages), Laboratory of Biotechnology and Gene Engineering (includes the group of Selection and Taxonomy of Bacteriophages), Laboratory of Microbial Ecology, and Laboratory for Genetics of Microorganisms and Bacteriophages.
