= Sialate O-acetylesterase =

Class of enzymes

sialate O-acetylesterase

Identifiers
- EC no.: 3.1.1.53
- CAS no.: 89400-31-7

Databases
- IntEnz: IntEnz view
- BRENDA: BRENDA entry
- ExPASy: NiceZyme view
- KEGG: KEGG entry
- MetaCyc: metabolic pathway
- PRIAM: profile
- PDB structures: RCSB PDB PDBe PDBsum
- Gene Ontology: AmiGO / QuickGO
Search
- PMC: articles
- PubMed: articles
- NCBI: proteins

The enzyme sialate O-acetylesterase (EC 3.1.1.53) catalyzes the reaction

N-acetyl-O-acetylneuraminate + H_{2}O = N-acetylneuraminate + acetate

In human it is encoded by the SIAE gene located on chromosome 11.

This enzyme belongs to the family of hydrolases, specifically those acting on carboxylic ester bonds. The systematic name of this enzyme class is N-acyl-O-acetylneuraminate O-acetylhydrolase. Other names in common use include N-acetylneuraminate acetyltransferase, sialate 9(4)-O-acetylesterase, and sialidase.

== Function ==
SIAE activity negatively regulates B lymphocyte antigen receptor signalling and is required for the maintenance of immunological tolerance. It down-regulates B lymphocyte antigen receptor signaling (involving CD22), and is required for immunological tolerance e.g. in mice.

== Structure ==
The SIAE gene contains 15 exons and expresses a protein that is approximately 56 kDa in size. It is known to be expressed in the adult testis.

== Clinical Significance ==
Genetic defects in SIAE have been associated with multiple autoimmune diseases. Loss of function mutations in SIAE are much more frequently found in humans with autoimmune diseases especially rheumatoid arthritis and type 1 diabetes.

Genetic variants and polymorphisms associated with the SIAE gene have been implicated in susceptibility to Autoimmune Disease 6 (AIS6). Individuals susceptible to AIS6 may suffer from rheumatoid arthritis, multiple sclerosis, lupus erythematosus, type 1 diabetes, and other autoimmune diseases. Individuals harboring rare heterozygous loss-of-function variants or homozygous defective polymorphic variants commonly produced enzymes that functioned in a dominant negative manner, leading to lack of SIAE enzymatic activities.

Missense single-nucleotide polymorphism in the SIAE gene has also been associated with the anti-PIT-1 antibody syndrome, a novel clinical entity related to autoimmune polyglandular syndrome (APS). Individuals with defective SIAE are characterized by the presence of circulating autoimmune antibodies against the pituitary-specific transcriptional factor-1 (PIT-1).

Rare variants for SIAE have also been implicated in autoimmune Addison's disease, but their pathogenic roles are inconclusive.
