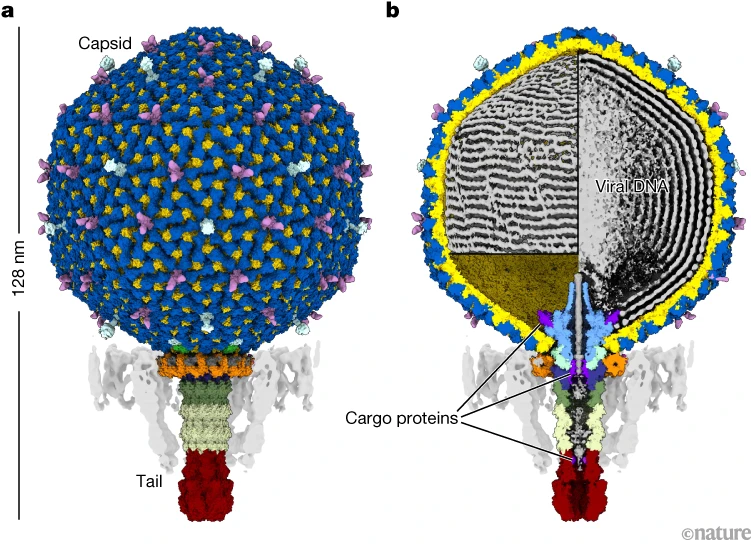
- 3D structure of the ΦcrAss001 virus particle. a, Molecular surface of the viral particle (virion), viewed from the outside. b, Cross-section through the virion. Proteins making up the capsid (protein shell) are shown in yellow and blue; cargo proteins are in purple; pink and pale-blue proteins on the capsid are head-fibre proteins; proteins making up the tail barrel are shown in different colours; and tail-fibre proteins are shown in grey. Credit: Bayfield, O. W. et al./Nature (CC BY 4.0).

Virus classification
- (unranked): Virus
- Realm: Duplodnaviria
- Kingdom: Heunggongvirae
- Phylum: Uroviricota
- Class: Caudoviricetes
- Order: Crassvirales

Families
- Crevaviridae; Darmviridae; Intestiviridae; Steigviridae; Suoliviridae

= CrAssphage =

crAss-like phage (crassvirus)

Order of viruses

CrAss-like phages (crassviruses) are an order of bacterial viruses (bacteriophages) that represent the most abundant viruses in the human gut, discovered in 2014 by cross assembling reads in human fecal metagenomes. In silico comparative genomics and taxonomic analysis have found that crAss-like phages represent a highly abundant and diverse family of viruses. CrAss-like phages were predicted to infect bacteria of the Bacteroidota phylum and the prediction was later confirmed when the first crAss-like phage (crAss001) was isolated on a Bacteroidota host (Bacteroides intestinalis) in 2018. Crassviruses used to be part of the abolished family of podoviruses, possessing short non-contractile tails and icosahedral capsids. The first 3D structure of a crassvirus was determined by cryo-EM in 2023. While the presence of crAss-like phage in the human gut is not yet associated with any specific health condition, they are generally associated with a healthy gut microbiome and likely impact significantly on the gut Bacteroidota.

== Discovery ==
The crAss (cross-assembly) software used to discover the first crAss-like phage, p-crAssphage (prototypical-crAssphage), relies on cross assembling reads from multiple metagenomes obtained from the same environment. The goal of cross-assembly is that unknown reads from one metagenome align with known reads, or reads that have similarity to known reads, in another metagenome, thereby increasing the total number of usable reads in each metagenome. The crAss software is an analysis tool for cross-assemblies which specializes in reference-independent comparative metagenomics. CrAss assumes that a contig(s) made up of reads from differing metagenomes (cross-contig) is representative of a biological entity present in each of the differing metagenomes. P-crAssphage was discovered when crAss was used to analyze the cross-assembly of twelve human fecal metagenomes. Several cross-contigs consisting of unknown reads were identified in all twelve individuals and through re-assembly techniques, the p-crAssphage genome was re-constructed. P-crAssphage has a ~97kbp circular DNA genome which contains 80 predicted open reading frames. Using co-occurrence analysis and CRISPR spacer similarities, the phage was predicted to infect Bacteroidota bacteria which are dominant members of the gut microbiome in most individuals.

== Taxonomy ==
Crassviruses constitute the order Crassvirales, which contains the following families:

- Crevaviridae
- Darmviridae
- Intestiviridae
- Steigviridae
- Suoliviridae

== Morphology ==
Crassviruses are podoviruses, possessing short non-contractile tails and icosahedral capsids.

== Replication ==
Based on initial sequence-based studies of crAss-like phage, the bacteriophage family was predicted to consist of phage with a diversity of lifestyles including lytic, lysogenic, and temperate. Despite the genetic evidence of certain lifestyles, in vitro studies of crAss-like phage replication strategies have yielded inconclusive results.

=== crAss001 and B. intestinalis ===
CrAss001 and its host, B. intestinalis, demonstrate a unique relationship in which the host and phage are able to stably co-exist and co-replicate in liquid culture, yet the phage efficiently lyses its host on solid agar substrates. Co-existence of a phage and its host would typically be indicative of a lysogenic lifestyle, but the crAss001 genome contains none of the genes needed for lysogeny. It was hypothesized that crAss001 uses a lesser-known replication strategy like pseudolysogeny or a carrier state, but a recent study has found evidence that the host is at least partially responsible for the stable co-existence through phase variation. It's now thought that B. intestinalis can modulate infection of crAss001 by modifying its capsular polysaccharides (an example of phase variation), some of which the phage uses for host-recognition. With phase variation, B. intestinalis can maintain subpopulations both resistant and susceptible to phage infection, thereby generating a unique environment in which crAss001 has consistent access to hosts (susceptible subpopulation) and B. intestinalis can replicate uninhibited by phage (resistant subpopulation). CrAss001 is still thought to infect the susceptible subpopulation using a pseudolysogenic or carrier state infection approach, both of which can be associated with a slow-release of phage from living bacterial hosts. The combination of host phase-variation and phage infection strategy yield a relationship in which the phage and host can exist in a stable equilibrium.

=== crAss002 and B. xylanisolvens ===
CrAss002 also exhibits an unusual relationship with its host, B. xylanisolvens. When crAss002 is inoculated into a culture of B. xylanisolvens, the phage takes several days of co-culturing to begin propagating after which it maintains a stable and relatively high titer. When isolated colonies of the co-cultured B. xylanisolvens were used to start new phage propagations, the colonies demonstrated varying responses to phage infection. Some cultures immediately supported phage propagation while others took several days. The differing responses of B. xylanisolvens indicated that the bacterial population was mixed and consisted of cells both susceptible and resistant to phage infection, similar to the subpopulations of susceptible and resistant hosts in the crAss001 and B. intestinalis phage-host relationship. Similar to crAss001, crAss002 does not possess the genes needed for lysogeny.

=== crAss001 and crAss002 in a bacterial community ===
In an attempt to see how crAss-like phage behaved in bacterial communities, crAss001 and crAss002 were inoculated into bioreactors containing a defined bacterial community representative of the human gut microbiota. The bacterial community included B. intestinalis and B. xylanisolvens, the respective hosts of crAss001 and crAss002. Despite the crAss001 and crAss002 titers increasing after infection, the cell counts of the bacterial community members were seemingly unaffected by the phage presence. The phage and bacterial community maintained stable population levels throughout the experiment, mimicking the behavior of crAss001 and crAss002 in pure-cultures. It's hypothesized that crAss-like phage and their hosts use unique mechanisms or combinations of mechanisms to maintain their stable equilibrium.

== Humans and crAss-like phage ==
CrAss-like phage have been identified as a highly abundant and near-universal member of the human gut microbiome. CrAss-like phage seem to be more prevalent in those that consume a western diet which favors the phages' host bacterial phylum, Bacteroidota. An evolutionary study of crAss-like phage and humans suggests that crAss-like phage prevalence amongst human populations expanded during industrialization and subsequent urbanization when a western diet become more common than a traditional hunter-gatherer diet. Another study, however, found evidence that the relationship between crAss-like phage and humans may extend back to the evolution of the human origin.

Due to the abundance and ubiquity of crAss-like phage in human populations, crAss-like phage have been tested as a method for detecting human feces. The virus may outperform indicator bacteria as a marker for human fecal contamination.

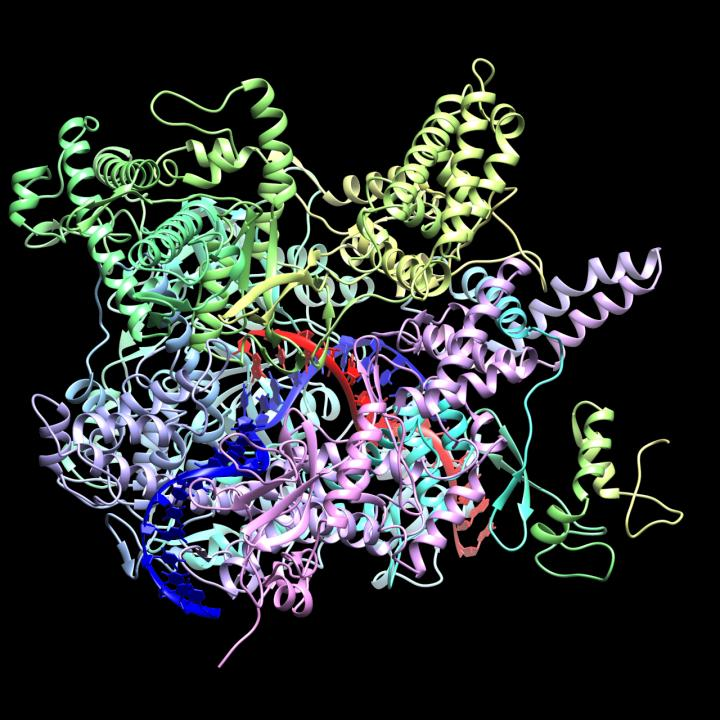
crAssphage RNA polymerase

The presence of crAss-like phage in human gut microbiomes has not yet been associated with variables relating to lifestyle or health and it is widely considered that crAss-like phage are benign inhabitants of many people's gut microbiome. While the presence of crAss-like phage does not seem to be a good indicator of health status, it is possible that the absence of crAss-like phage from the gut microbiome may be indicative of certain health conditions, like metabolic syndrome.

CrAss-like phage are thought to be vertically transmitted from mother to offspring, despite the crAss-like phage abundance at birth being low to undetectable. During the first year of life, crAss-like phage abundance and diversity within the gut microbiome significantly increases. Additionally, there is strong evidence that specific crAss-like phage can be transmitted between humans via fecal microbial transplants (FMTs).

The RNA polymerase of crAss-like phage phi14:2 shares structural homology to RNA polymerases used to catalyze RNA interference in humans and animals. Phi14:2 is thought to deliver its RNA polymerase into the host cell upon infection where it can begin transcription of phi14:2 genes. Because of the delivery mechanism and the similarity of eukaryotic RNA interference polymerases and the phi14:2 RNA polymerase, it's hypothesized that eukaryotic RNA interference polymerases may have originated from phage.

Gubaphages have been identified as another highly abundant phage group in the human gut microbiome. The characteristics of the gubaphages are reminiscent to those of p-crAssphage.

== crAss-like phage environments ==
Based on a sequence similarity screen of p-crAssphage protein sequences to protein sequences in public sequence databases and metagenomes, it was concluded that the crAss-like phage family may consist of a wide diversity of bacteriophage members which can be found in a range of environments including human guts and termite guts, terrestrial/groundwater environments, soda lake (hypersaline brine), marine sediment, and plant root environments.
