= Retron =

Retron msr RNA
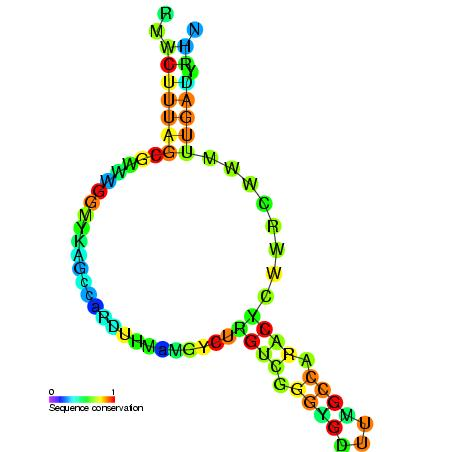
- Predicted secondary structure and sequence conservation of msr

Identifiers
- Symbol: msr
- Rfam: RF00170

Other data
- RNA type: Gene
- Domain: Bacteria
- SO: SO:0000233
- PDB structures: PDBe

A retron is a distinct DNA sequence found in the genome of many bacteria species that codes for reverse transcriptase and a unique single-stranded DNA/RNA hybrid called multicopy single-stranded DNA (msDNA). Retron msr RNA is the non-coding RNA produced by retron elements and is the immediate precursor to the synthesis of msDNA. The retron msr RNA folds into a characteristic secondary structure that contains a conserved guanosine residue at the end of a stem loop. Synthesis of DNA by the retron-encoded reverse transcriptase (RT) results in a DNA/RNA chimera which is composed of small single-stranded DNA linked to small single-stranded RNA. The RNA strand is joined to the 5′ end of the DNA chain via a 2′–5′ phosphodiester linkage that occurs from the 2′ position of the conserved internal guanosine residue.

== Sequence and structure ==
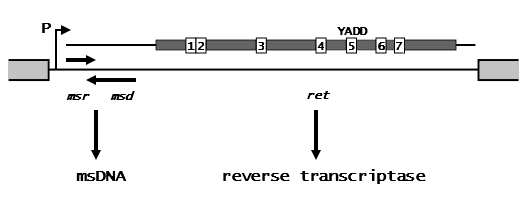
The retron operon carries a promoter sequence P that controls the synthesis of an RNA transcript carrying three loci: msr, msd, and ret. The ret gene product, a reverse transcriptase, processes the msd/msr portion of the RNA transcript into msDNA.

Retron elements are about 2 kb long. They contain a single operon controlling the synthesis of an RNA transcript carrying three loci, msr, msd, and ret, that are involved in msDNA synthesis. The DNA portion of msDNA is encoded by the msd gene, the RNA portion is encoded by the msr gene, while the product of the ret gene is a reverse transcriptase similar to the RTs produced by retroviruses and other types of retroelements. Like other reverse transcriptases, the retron RT contains seven regions of conserved amino acids (labeled 1–7 in the figure), including a highly conserved tyr-ala-asp-asp (YADD) sequence associated with the catalytic core. The ret gene product is responsible for processing the msd/msr portion of the RNA transcript into msDNA.

== Classification and occurrence ==
For many years after their discovery in animal viruses, reverse transcriptases were believed to be absent from prokaryotes. Currently, however, RT-encoding elements, i.e. retroelements, have been found in a wide variety of different bacteria:

- Retrons were the first family of retroelement discovered in bacteria; the other two families of known bacterial retroelements are:
- group II introns: Group II introns are the best characterized bacterial retroelement and the only type known to exhibit autonomous mobility; they consist of an RT encoded within a catalytic, self-splicing RNA structure. Group II intron mobility is mediated by a ribonucleoprotein comprising an intron lariat bound to two intron-coded proteins.
- diversity-generating retroelements (DGRs). The DGRs are not mobile, but function to diversify DNA sequences. For example, DGRs mediate the switch between pathogenic and free-living phases of Bordetella.

== Function ==
Since retrons are not mobile, their appearance in diverse bacterial species is not a "selfish DNA" phenomenon. Rather, bacterial retrons confer some protection from phage infection to bacterial hosts. Several retrons are located in DNA regions next to certain protein effector-coding genes. When their expression is activated, most of these effectors and their associated retrons function together to block phage infection.

== Retrons in genetic engineering ==
Retrons have emerged as powerful tools in genetic engineering due to their unique ability to produce single-stranded DNA (ssDNA) inside cells. Here are some of the key ways retrons have been used:

=== In Situ DNA Production for Genome Editing ===
Retrons generate ssDNA through reverse transcription of a noncoding RNA. This ssDNA can serve as a donor template for genome editing, for example in recombineering and CRISPR-based systems. This approach allows for precise, targeted mutations without the need to introduce external DNA.

=== Retron Library Recombineering (RLR) ===
RLR is a technique that enables massively parallel genome editing. It uses retrons to generate millions of unique mutations simultaneously, each tagged with a molecular "barcode." This allows researchers to:

- Perform high-throughput genetic screens
- Simultaneously modify multiple sites on a single genome
- Study genotype-phenotype relationships
- Track mutations across large populations of cells

=== Biological Recording ===
Retrons have been engineered to act as molecular recorders, capturing information about cellular events by integrating specific DNA sequences into the genome. This could be used to monitor gene expression or environmental changes over time.

=== Reduced Toxicity Compared to CRISPR ===
Unlike CRISPR-Cas9, which introduces double-stranded breaks (DSBs) that can be toxic or may lead to off-target effects, retron-based editing avoids DSBs, making it a reduced toxicity alternative for certain applications.

=== Synthetic Biology and Evolutionary Engineering ===
Retrons are being explored for continuous evolution of synthetic genomes, enabling iterative cycles of mutation and selection to evolve new traits or functions in microbes.
