= Rotem Sorek =

Israeli scientist

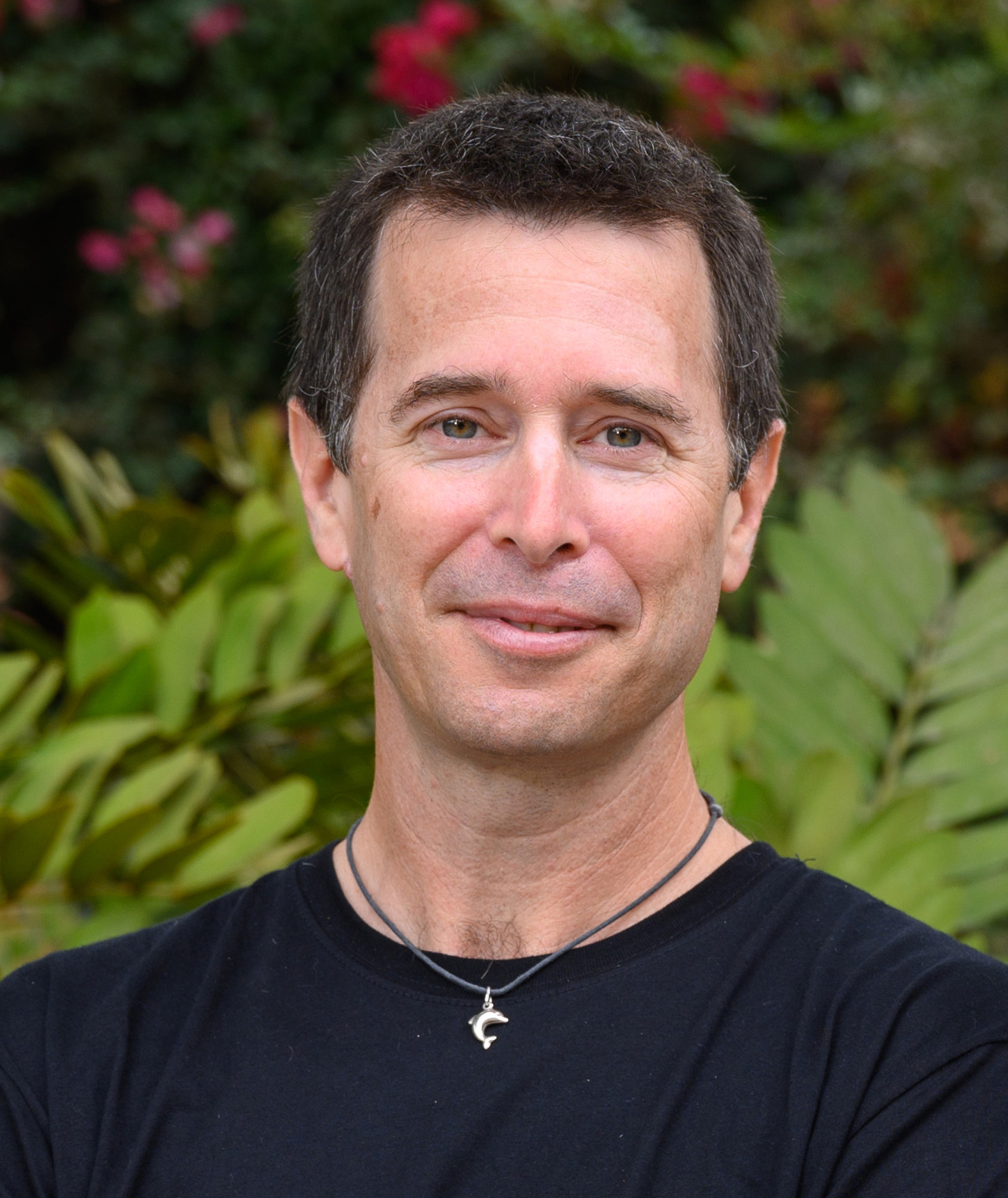
- Born: March 16, 1975 (age 51)
- Education: Tel Aviv University; Lawrence Berkeley National Laboratory
- Known for: The bacterial immune system Origin of human innate immunity Communication between viruses
- Awards: HFSP Nakasone Award (2023); Max Planck-Humboldt Research Award (2023); Rothschild Prize (2024); Selman A. Waksman Award in Microbiology (2025); Gruber Prize in Genetics (2025); Robert Koch Prize (2025)
- Scientific career
- Fields: Microbiology; Immunology; Genomics
- Workplaces: Weizmann Institute of Science
- Website: www.weizmann.ac.il/molgen/Sorek/

Rotem Sorek (Hebrew: רותם שורק; born March 16, 1975) is an Israeli scientist known for his discoveries on the bacterial immune system and for his works on the evolutionary origin of human innate immunity. Sorek is also known for his discovery that viruses can use small molecules to communicate and coordinate their infection dynamics.

Sorek is a Professor of molecular genetics at the Weizmann Institute of Science, where he heads the laboratory of microbial genomics and systems biology. He is an elected member of the German National Academy of Sciences Leopoldina and the US National Academy of Sciences.

== Academic career ==
Sorek earned a PhD in human genetics from Tel Aviv University in 2007, advised by Gil Ast and Ron Shamir. After conducting postdoctoral studies at the Lawrence Berkeley National Laboratory in Berkeley, CA, he joined the Weizmann Institute of Science in 2008. Since 2014 Sorek is a Professor at the Weizmann Institute's department of Molecular Genetics.

== Research ==
=== Early research ===
In his PhD studies, Sorek worked to show how new exons (pieces of genes in the human genome) are generated during evolution. During his postdoctoral studies he developed a computational method to assess toxicity of gene cloning into bacteria, and studied aspects of barriers to horizontal gene transfer. As an assistant professor Sorek studied RNA-mediated regulation in bacteria, and discovered how the CRISPR-Cas system acquires new immune memories.

=== The bacterial immune system ===
Sorek developed a large-scale functional genomics methodology to understand how bacteria protect themselves against viral (phage) infection. In a series of studies starting from 2015, he revealed dozens of previously unknown, sophisticated immunity mechanisms employed by bacteria to defend against phages.

Sorek's discoveries led to the understanding that many components of the human innate immune system evolved from defense systems that protect bacteria from phage infection, and showed that the cGAS-STING antiviral pathway, originally discovered in animals, is also widespread in bacteria and protects them against phage infection. In addition, he found that genes with Toll-interleukin receptor (TIR) domains are involved in bacterial defense against phages, providing evidence for a common, ancient ancestry of innate immunity components shared between animals, plants, and bacteria. Sorek also reported that a human inflammatory process called Pyroptosis also originated in bacteria. His studies explained how the human innate immune system evolved, and helped characterize new immune mechanisms in humans, plants and other eukaryotes.

In parallel, Sorek's studies revealed new kinds of small molecules used by both bacteria and eukaryotes for intracellular immune signaling, as well as discovered that reverse-transcribed non-coding RNAs called retrons mediate defense against phage. His studies also showed that some bacteria produce new types of anti-viral molecules as part of their immune mechanisms against phages. Sorek's research also aimed to reveal how viruses overcome bacterial defenses.

=== Communication between viruses ===
In 2017, Rotem Sorek discovered that viruses can use small-molecule communication to coordinate their infection dynamics. His studies were the first to show that phages can make group decisions via small-molecule communication. The communication molecule he discovered, called "Arbitrium", helps viruses to decide between the lytic and the lysogenic cycles, i.e., whether to replicate and lyse their host or to lysogenize and keep the host viable. Sorek and his team found that the Arbitrium molecule is a 6-aminoacid long peptide, which is produced by the phage and released to the medium during infection. In subsequent infections, progeny phages measure the concentration of this peptide and lysogenize if the concentration is sufficiently high. Sorek further found that the arbitrium system is encoded by hundreds of phages that infect soil bacteria, and comprises three phage genes that produce and perceive the molecule. His studies contributed to a scientific field called "Sociovirology".

== Awards and honors ==
- 2015 Elected member of the European Academy of Microbiology
- 2018 Elected member of the European Molecular Biology Organization (EMBO)
- 2021 Rappaport Prize for Excellence in Biomedical Research
- 2022 Landau Prize
- 2022 The Michael Bruno Memorial Award
- 2022 Elected member of the German National Academy of Sciences Leopoldina
- 2023 HFSP Nakasone Award
- 2023 Max Planck-Humboldt Research Award, by Max Planck Society
- 2024 Rothschild Prize in Life Sciences
- 2025 Selman A. Waksman Award in Microbiology
- 2025 Elected international member of the United States National Academy of Sciences
- 2025 Gruber Prize in Genetics
- 2025 Robert Koch Prize
