= Arbitrium =

Viral protein in bacteriophages

Arbitrium is a viral peptide produced by bacteriophages to communicate with each other and decide host cell fate. It is six amino acids(aa) long, and so is also referred to as a hexapeptide. It is produced when a phage infects a bacterial host and signals to other phages that the host has been infected.

== Discovery ==
Arbitrium was first observed by a team led by Rotem Sorek, a microbial geneticist at the Weizmann Institute of Science in Israel. They were studying communication in Bacillus subtilis bacteria - in particular, how bacteria infected with phages warn nearby uninfected bacteria about the presence of these viruses. They found that the phages (strain phi3T) communicated with each other to co-ordinate their infection. Additionally, they found similarities between the human innate immune system and the bacterial defense system against phages. It appears that components of the immune system originated from the bacterial defense system.

== Mechanism ==
When a temperate phage infects a bacterium, it may enter either the lytic or the lysogenic pathway. The lytic pathway causes the host to produce and release progeny virions, usually killing it in the process. The lysogenic pathway involves the virus inserting itself into the bacterium's chromosome. At a later stage, the viral genome is activated, and it continues along the lytic pathway of producing and releasing progeny virions.

Arbitrium is used by at least some phages to judge how common fresh hosts are. Each infection causes the production of some arbitrium, and the remaining phages gauge the concentration of arbitrium around them. If the arbitrium concentration is too high, it may indicate that uninfected hosts are running out. The viruses then switch from lysis to lysogeny, so as to not deplete all available hosts.

According to a team led by Alberto Marina at the Biomedical Institute of Valencia in Spain, also studying the Bacillus subtilis/ SPbeta phage system, arbitrium (AimP) binds to the AimX transcription factor AimR, and suppresses the activity of AimX, a negative regulator of lysogeny. Marina has also shown in the same system that the virus's arbitrium receptor interacts not only with bacterial genes that help it reproduce, but also with several other stretches of DNA. He has suggested that arbitrium signals may be able to alter the activity of important bacterial genes.

More recently, another team at the Sorek lab, headed by Avigail Stokar-Avihail and Nitzan Tal, has shown similar systems in other species of Bacillus bacteria, the pathogenic species Bacillus anthracis, Bacillus cereus, and Bacillus thuringiensis. They speculate that "the occurrence of peptide-based communication systems among phages more broadly remains to be explored."

== Regulation ==
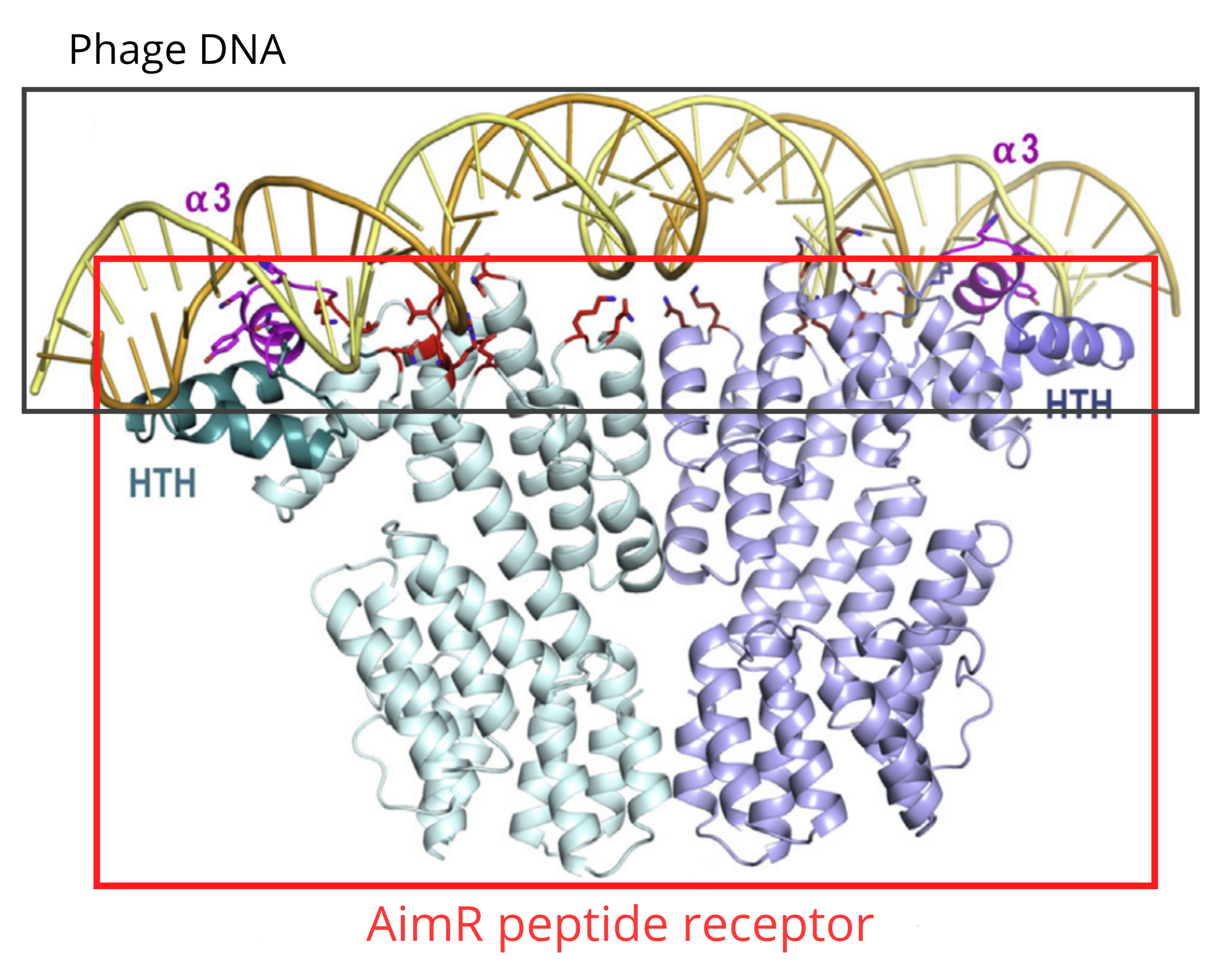
Arbitrium peptide

The arbitrium system comprises three genes: aimP, responsible for encoding the arbitrium peptide, aimR, responsible for encoding transcription factors that bind to aimP, and aimX, which produces non-coding RNA that suppresses lysogeny. The structure of aimR complex is still unknown. As a result lysis is induced by a mechanism that we still are unaware of. The aimP gene codes for a 43 amino acid (aa) peptide, which matures into a 6 amino acid (aa) active form. The mature protein is transported to neighboring bacteria using the oligopeptide permease (OPP) transporter channel. The OPP transport channel is capable of transporting peptides inside the bacteria cell with no specific size, composition, charge, or sequence. Once inside, the mature AimP binds to the AimR receptor and regulates its activity. As a result, AimR loses its DNA-binding ability. AimX, whose expression is promoted by AimR, is also thus suppressed.

In the early stages of infection the number of active phages is quite low. At this point, the arbitrium peptide is not yet present and AimR activates aimX expression. This would then promote the lytic cycle of the phage. Once the phage has replicated multiple times, AimP builds up in the medium. The concentration of the mature AimP peptide increases until it reaches the threshold level required to bind to the AimR receptor. If and when this occurs, AimR stops activating aimX expression, causing the stimulation of the lysogenic cycle as well as the integration of the prophage into the bacterial chromosome. This then keeps eradication of the bacterial population by the phage from occurring. The arbitrium communication system thus allows infecting phages to decide the cell fate.

== Applications ==
Sorek has suggested that since human viruses like HIV and herpes simplex can cause active and latent infections, they might be using an arbitrium-like system to communicate. In this case, that analogue could be used to suppress infections by making the viruses completely latent. Prof. Martha Clokie, of the University of Leicester, has hailed the discovery of viral communication as 'transformative'.

== See also ==
- Quorum sensing - the corresponding phenomenon in bacteria
