= Harry L.T. Mobley =

American microbiologist and professor

- Born: Harry Lee Thompson Mobley; July 17, 1953 (age 73); Rock Hill, South Carolina
- Education: Emory University
- Scientific career
- Fields: microbiology
- Workplaces: University of Michigan Medical School
- Doctoral advisor: Ronald J. Doyle

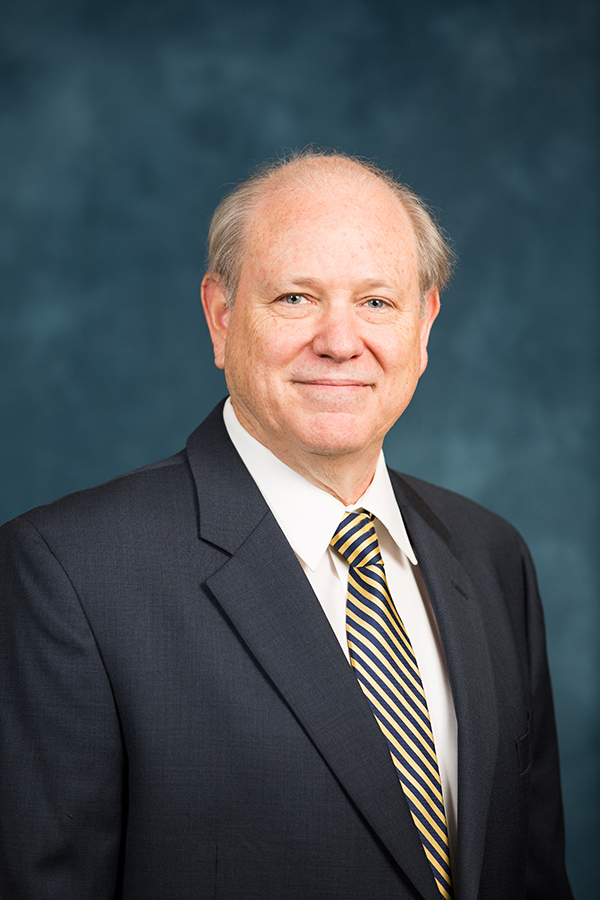
Harry L.T. Mobley, PhD

Harry Lee Thompson Mobley, Ph.D, is the Frederick G. Novy Distinguished University Professor of Microbiology and Immunology at the University of Michigan Medical School. His research focused on elucidating the mechanisms by which Gram-negative bacilli that include E. coli, Proteus mirabilis, Klebsiella pneumoniae, Citrobacter freundii, Serratia marcescens, Acinetobacter baumannii, and Helicobacter pylori colonize initial sites of infections that include the urinary tract, the lungs, and the gastrointestinal tract, in some cases, disseminating systemically and entering the bloodstream and the blood-filtering organs including the spleen and liver. For decades, the lab studied urinary tract infection including both "uncomplicated" UTI in otherwise healthy women and "complicated" UTI such as catheter-associated UTI. Bacterial infections of the bladder can ascend to the kidneys and enter renal capillaries to gain access to the bloodstream and infect blood-filtering organs. His research focused on the mechanism by which Gram-negative bacilli colonize the human host, elude the innate immune response, and disseminate from primary sites of infection including the urinary tract into the bloodstream.

Dr. Mobley trained in microbial physiology, biochemistry, bacterial genetics, molecular pathogenesis, and vaccine development. He opened his laboratory in 1984 at the University of Maryland School of Medicine in the laboratories of the Division of Infectious Diseases. He began his work through epidemiological studies of catheter-associated bacteriuria and began bench investigation of the bacterial strains causing these infections. He worked both on uncomplicated infections [caused primarily by uropathogenic E. coli (UPEC)] plaguing otherwise healthy women, and complicated infections (Proteus mirabilis as most prevalent pathogen) in which foreign bodies such as indwelling catheters or structural abnormalities exacerbated infections.

In 2004, he moved the laboratory to the University of Michigan Medical School to continue this work and to serve as Chair of the Department of Microbiology and Immunology until 2019. During the course of training 34 graduate students (30 Ph.D. and 4 M.S.), 38 postdoctoral fellows, and 5 research track faculty, his lab advanced the field's understanding of the molecular pathogenesis of E. coli and P. mirabilis UTIs, the gastric pathogen Helicobacter pylori, and other Gram-negative species.

His lab published over 300 peer-reviewed articles, 49 book chapters, and 5 books that have been cited in the literature, according to Google Scholar, >50,000 times (h-index>108).

Research in the Mobley Lab was continuously supported by grants from the National Institutes of Health from 1986 to 2027.

During his career, he delivered over 250 scientific presentations in 21 countries.

Early life, education, and academic career

Mobley was born in Rock Hill, South Carolina in 1953 and moved to Louisville, Kentucky in 1958 where he was educated in the Public School System. He was the son of Henry Pope Mobley, Jr., a Presbyterian minister, and Anne Thompson Mobley. He received a Bachelor of Sciences degree in Biology from Emory University in 1975, an M.S. in 1977 and Ph.D. from University of Louisville in 1981. He conducted postdoctoral work at the University of Maryland School of Medicine in Biochemistry and Vaccine Development after which he joined the faculty in the Division of Infectious Diseases in 1984. He was promoted to Associate Professor in 1989 and to Professor in 1995. In 1997, he moved his appointment to the Department of Microbiology and Immunology.

In 2004, he moved his laboratory to Ann Arbor, Michigan and became Chair of the Department of Microbiology and Immunology at the University of Michigan Medical School.

He stepped down after 15 years in 2019, and retired from his research laboratory in 2024.

Departmental Administration

Harry LT Mobley, PhD, was recruited to the University of Michigan as the Frederick G Novy Collegiate Professor & Chair of the Department of Microbiology & Immunology in 2004. At that time, the department had 13 instructional track, primary faculty members. From Mobley's arrival in July 2004 to 2019, the department more than doubled in size, adding 17 primary faculty members.

In 2004, the department had approximately $7 million in NIH grant dollars. Despite the national challenges facing faculty in obtaining extramural funding, in 2019, that number rose to just over $18 million. Initially, in 2003, the Department was ranked 39th in the nation in NIH funding, but rose to 8th place by 2018 just prior to him stepping down from the chair in 2019.

Major topics of Research Investigation

Uropathogenic Escherichia coli. Urinary tract infection (UTI) is the most frequently diagnosed kidney and urologic disease and E. coli is by far its most common etiologic agent, accounting for more than 80% of uncomplicated UTIs in otherwise healthy individuals (~90% of infections affect women). Recurrent UTI is common among girls and young nonpregnant women who are healthy and have anatomically normal urinary tracts. These infections are a main source of morbidity and health-care cost in this population. The Mobley Lab investigated the virulence mechanisms of this species for four decades. The genome of type strain, E. coli CFT073, isolated by his group from a hospitalized patient with acute pyelonephritis and bacteremia was sequenced and annotated in a collaborative effort and was only the third E. coli genome to be sequenced. They identified 13 pathogenicity islands inserted into the genome and characterized virulence determinants including P and type 1 fimbriae, flagella, hemolysin (other toxins), and multiple iron acquisition systems. The latter proteins (siderophore- and heme-receptors), which are always highly expressed during infection, were used to develop an experimental vaccine to protect against UTI. In addition, using a pathogen-specific microarray, they measured expression levels for all genes from E. coli CFT073 collected directly from the urine of experimentally infected mice and women with cystitis. This identified all genes that were expressed in vivo. They extended these studies by measuring global gene expression in E. coli strains in the urine of women during active UTIs using RNA-Seq technologies. These studies identified novel transport systems induced specifically in humans during an active infection. Further, they determined, using "peak-to-trough" measurements of the ratio of the origin or chromosomal replication to the terminus of replication for E. coli chromosomal DNA, collected and stabilized immediately in the urine of women with active UTIs, that UPEC strains have an extraordinarily rapid growth rate during human infection.

References:

1. Sintsova, A.; Frick-Cheng, A. E.; Smith, S.; Pirani, A.; Subashchandrabose, S.; Snitkin, E. S.; Mobley, H. (2019). "Genetically diverse uropathogenic Escherichia coli adopt a common transcriptional program in patients with UTIs". eLife. 8 e49748. doi:10.7554/eLife.49748. PMC 6802966. PMID 31633483.
2. Subashchandrabose, S.; Hazen, T. H.; Brumbaugh, A. R.; Himpsl, S. D.; Smith, S. N.; Ernst, R. D.; Rasko, D. A.; Mobley, H. L. (2014). "Host-specific induction of Escherichia coli fitness genes during human urinary tract infection". Proceedings of the National Academy of Sciences of the United States of America. 111 (51): 18327–18332. Bibcode:2014PNAS..11118327S. doi:10.1073/pnas.1415959112. PMC 4280598. PMID 25489107.
3. Frick-Cheng, A. E.; Sintsova, A.; Smith, S. N.; Krauthammer, M.; Eaton, K. A.; Mobley HLT (2020). "The Gene Expression Profile of Uropathogenic Escherichia coli in Women with Uncomplicated Urinary Tract Infections is Recapitulated in the Mouse Model". mBio. 11 (4) e01412-20. doi:10.1128/mBio.01412-20. PMC 7439467. PMID 32788379.

Proteus mirabilis. There are currently >2 million patients residing in our 18,000 U.S. nursing homes. In these facilities, urinary incontinence, a very frequent complication, is treated with long-term (>30 days) urinary catheterization. Nearly 100% of these patients become bacteriuric, often leading to fever, bacteremia and death. Proteus mirabilis and related species, Providencia stuartii and Morganella morganii account for more than half of these infections. Proteus mirabilis, a gram-negative enteric bacterium, differentiates between the vegetative swimmer cell and the hyper-flagellated swarmer cell. Individuals suffering UTI caused by P. mirabilis and related urease-positive bacterial species often develop bacteriuria, kidney and bladder stones, catheter obstruction due to stone encrustation, acute pyelonephritis, fever, and in some cases, bloodstream infection and sepsis. The Mobley Lab was first to characterize the ureases of these species using molecular techniques. P. mirabilis uses biofilm formation and swarming motility to colonize indwelling urinary catheters, and then migrates through the urethra and into the bladder. The high level of urea (~0.4 M) in urine saturates the urease enzyme within colonizing bacteria and thus the enzymes work at V_{max.} The urea-induced transcriptional activator of urease, UreR, facilitates transcription of urease genes ureDABCEFG. Urease increases the local pH surrounding the bacteria and causes precipitation of calcium and magnesium salts; these crystals form a matrix in which the bacteria are found in high numbers. The environment within the bladder either selects or signals production of MR/P fimbriae, as >85% of the bacteria are expressing this surface structure two to four days after infection, as detected by the orientation of the mrp promoter that resides on an invertible element. MrpJ, a protein encoded by the mrp operon, represses flagella synthesis while the adherent fimbria are expressed. P. mirabilis produces many virulence factors during ascending infection, that when inactivated, attenuate the bacterium. These virulence proteins include urease, flagellin, autotransported proteases, hemolysin, MR/P (and numerous other) fimbriae, the type VI secretion system, and a number of metabolic enzymes. Bacteria ascend the ureters by swimming motility, and the majority of bacteria within the lumen of the ureters are producing MR/P fimbriae. P. mirabilis swarms on solid surfaces such as catheters and agar. When swarming bacteria meet an opposing strain they deploy a type VI secretion system to inject toxic proteins into the opponent, killing them and form a line of demarcation known as the "Dienes line".

References:

1. Armbruster, C. E.; Forsyth-Deornellas, V.; Johnson, A. O.; Smith, S. N.; Zhao, L.; Wu, W.; Mobley, H. L. (2017). "Genome-wide transposon mutagenesis of Proteus mirabilis: Essential genes, fitness factors for catheter-associated urinary tract infection, and the impact of polymicrobial infection on fitness requirements". PLOS Pathogens. 13 (6) e1006434. doi:10.1371/journal.ppat.1006434. PMC 5484520. PMID 28614382.
2. Alteri, C. J.; Himpsl, S. D.; Pickens, S. R.; Lindner, J. R.; Zora, J. S.; Miller, J. E.; Arno, P. D.; Straight, S. W.; Mobley, H. L. (2013). "Multicellular Bacteria Deploy the Type VI Secretion System to Preemptively Strike Neighboring Cells". PLOS Pathogens. 9 (9) e1003608. doi:10.1371/journal.ppat.1003608. PMC 3764213. PMID 24039579.
3. Pearson, M. M.; Yep, A.; Smith, S. N.; Mobley, H. L. (2011). "Transcriptome of Proteus mirabilis in the Murine Urinary Tract: Virulence and Nitrogen Assimilation Gene Expression". Infection and Immunity. 79 (7): 2619–2631. doi:10.1128/IAI.05152-11. PMC 3191972. PMID 21505083.
4. Li, X.; Rasko, D. A.; Lockatell, C. V.; Johnson, D. E.; Mobley, H. L. (2001). "Repression of bacterial motility by a novel fimbrial gene product". The EMBO Journal. 20 (17): 4854–4862. doi:10.1093/emboj/20.17.4854. PMC 125589. PMID 11532949.

Vaccine Development against Uropathogenic Bacterial Species. The Mobley lab had a longstanding interest in the development of vaccines to protect humans against urinary tract infections by uropathogenic bacterial species including both E. coli and Proteus mirabilis. They focused on rational selection of potentially protective antigens using genomics of uropathogens, transcriptomics of E. coli during UTIs in women and the murine model of ascending UTI, proteomics to identify surface-exposed antigens, computer algorithms to identify potentially protective antigens, in vivo expression technology (IVET) to identify potential antigens expressed during infection, and mass spectrometry to identify bacterial antigens recognized by post-immune serum. They pioneered the use of siderophores (organic chelators of iron that are secreted from the bacterium) as protective vaccine antigens, and routinely used ELISAs to monitor serum and secretory antibodies produced against vaccine antigens. Refinement of the antigen selection, delivery by the intranasal route, and selection of the optimal adjuvant (or adjuvant combinations) was refined.

References:

1. Forsyth, V. S.; Himpsl, S. D.; Smith, S. N.; Sarkissian, C. A.; Mike, L. A.; Stocki, J. A.; Sintsova, A.; Alteri, C. J.; Mobley, H. L. (2020). "Optimization of an Experimental Vaccine to Prevent Escherichia coli Urinary Tract Infection". mBio. 11 (2): e00555-20. doi:10.1128/mBio.00555-20. PMC 7188996. PMID 32345645.
2. Mike, L. A.; Smith, S. N.; Sumner, C. A.; Eaton, K. A.; Mobley, H. L. (2016). "Siderophore vaccine conjugates protect against uropathogenic Escherichia coli urinary tract infection". Proceedings of the National Academy of Sciences of the United States of America. 113 (47): 13468–13473. Bibcode:2016PNAS..11313468M. doi:10.1073/pnas.1606324113. PMC 5127358. PMID 27821778.
3. Alteri, C. J.; Hagan, E. C.; Sivick, K. E.; Smith, S. N.; Mobley, H. L. (2009). "Mucosal Immunization with Iron Receptor Antigens Protects against Urinary Tract Infection". PLOS Pathogens. 5 (9) e1000586. doi:10.1371/journal.ppat.1000586. PMC 2736566. PMID 19806177.
4. Li, X.; Lockatell, C. V.; Johnson, D. E.; Lane, M. C.; Warren, J. W.; Mobley, H. L. (2004). "Development of an Intranasal Vaccine to Prevent Urinary Tract Infection by Proteus mirabilis". Infection and Immunity. 72 (1): 66–75. doi:10.1128/IAI.72.1.66-75.2004. PMC 343968. PMID 14688082.

Bacteremia. Sepsis is life-threatening organ dysfunction that results from an unregulated immune response to infection. It is the leading cause of death in hospitalized patients across the United States with a mortality rate of 25-50% leading to 220,000 deaths per year. Bacteremia is a leading cause of sepsis and Gram-negative pathogens cause nearly half of bacteremia cases annually (PMID31010862). Species within the Enterobacterales order are the most common cause of Gram-negative bacteremia, including the species Escherichia coli, Klebsiella pneumoniae, Serratia marcescens, Citrobacter freundii (PMID12913767) and Enterobacter hormaechei (PMID15306996). Early treatment with antibiotics is critical to reduce mortality, but antibiotic resistance may thwart this empiric therapy. There is a critical need to develop new therapies and salvage existing ones, so that we can counter antibiotic resistance and reduce sepsis mortality.

Bacteremia has three phases of pathogenesis: initial primary site infection, dissemination to the bloodstream, and growth and survival in blood and blood-filtering organs (PMID33692149). In Gram-negative bacteremia, the primary site serves as a reservoir of the pathogen that can intermittently re-seed the bloodstream and prolong the infection. The Mobley Lab determined that Enterobacterales species replicate rapidly in the liver and spleen during bacteremia (PMID34225485), but are slowly cleared in most cases, indicating that the immune system can overcome rapid bacterial growth. Whereas current antibiotics are based on the ability to kill or inhibit bacterial growth in vitro, there is an opportunity to identify drug targets that are specifically required during infection. To enable drug discovery, extensive genomic comparisons and identified the multi-species core genome of Enterobacterales species commonly causing bacteremia in humans were conducted (Fouts et al.., submitted). By integrating our pangenome and genome-wide fitness data, Tn-seq screen hits to predicted fitness genes shared among Enterobacterales species were identified.

Although phenotypically similar in terms of antimicrobial resistance and biochemical identification tests, these Gram-negative species nevertheless represent a heterogeneous group of strains that differs in virulence mechanisms, primary sites of infection, and metabolic pathways. There is also wide variation in knowledge regarding infections of the bloodstream. While there are several studies that directly or indirectly implicate specific genes in contributing to successful dissemination to and survival in the bloodstream, thus far there has been no systematic analysis of shared genes that are critical for Gram-negative pathogens to thrive in this hostile host environment. The Mobley and Bachman Labs addressed the relative lack of rigorous studies of the pathogenesis and potential for novel treatments of Enterobacterales bacteremia.

References:

1. Holmes, C. L.; Smith, S. N.; Gurczynski, S. J.; Severin, G. B.; Unverdorben, L. V.; Vornhagen, J.; Mobley, H. L.; Bachman, M. A. (2022). "The ADP-Heptose Biosynthesis Enzyme GMHB is a Conserved Gram-Negative Bacteremia Fitness Factor". Infection and Immunity. 90 (7): e00224-22. doi:10.1128/iai.00224-22. PMC 9302095. PMID 35762751.
2. Brown, A. N.; Anderson, M. T.; Bachman, M. A.; Mobley, H. L. (2022). "The ArcAB Two-Component System: Function in Metabolism, Redox Control, and Infection". Microbiology and Molecular Biology Reviews. 86 (2): e00110-21. doi:10.1128/mmbr.00110-21. PMC 9199408. PMID 35442087.
3. Anderson, M. T.; Himpsl, S. D.; Mitchell, L. A.; Kingsley, L. G.; Snider, E. P.; Mobley, H. L. (2022). "Identification of distinct capsule types associated with Serratia marcescens infection isolates". PLOS Pathogens. 18 (3) e1010423. doi:10.1371/journal.ppat.1010423. PMC 9000132. PMID 35353877.
4. Anderson, M. T.; Brown, A. N.; Pirani, A.; Smith, S. N.; Photenhauer, A. L.; Sun, Y.; Snitkin, E. S.; Bachman, M. A.; Mobley, H. L. (2021). "Replication Dynamics for Six Gram-Negative Bacterial Species during Bloodstream Infection". mBio. 12 (4): e01114-21. doi:10.1128/mBio.01114-21. PMC 8406280. PMID 34225485.
5. Holmes, C. L.; Anderson, M. T.; Mobley, H. L.; Bachman, M. A. (2021). "Pathogenesis of Gram-Negative Bacteremia". Clinical Microbiology Reviews. 34 (2): e00234-20. doi:10.1128/CMR.00234-20. PMC 8549824. PMID 33692149.
6. Mike, L. A.; Stark, A. J.; Forsyth, V. S.; Vornhagen, J.; Smith, S. N.; Bachman, M. A.; Mobley, H. L. (2021). "A systematic analysis of hypermucoviscosity and capsule reveals distinct and overlapping genes that impact Klebsiella pneumoniae fitness". PLOS Pathogens. 17 (3) e1009376. doi:10.1371/journal.ppat.1009376. PMC 7993769. PMID 33720976.
7. Weakland, D. R.; Smith, S. N.; Bell, B.; Tripathi, A.; Mobley, H. L. (2020). "The Serratia marcescens Siderophore Serratiochelin is Necessary for Full Virulence during Bloodstream Infection". Infection and Immunity. 88 (8): e00117-20. doi:10.1128/IAI.00117-20. PMC 7375758. PMID 32393508.
8. Vornhagen, J.; Sun, Y.; Breen, P.; Forsyth, V.; Zhao, L.; Mobley, H. L.; Bachman, M. A. (2019). "The Klebsiella pneumoniae citrate synthase gene, gltA, influences site specific fitness during infection". PLOS Pathogens. 15 (8) e1008010. doi:10.1371/journal.ppat.1008010. PMC 6730947. PMID 31449551.
9. Anderson, M. T.; Mitchell, L. A.; Sintsova, A.; Rice, K. A.; Mobley, H. L. (2019). "Sulfur Assimilation Alters Flagellar Function and Modulates the Gene Expression Landscape of Serratia marcescens". mSystems. 4 (4): e00285-19. doi:10.1128/mSystems.00285-19. PMC 6687942. PMID 31387930.
10. Armbruster, C. E.; Forsyth, V. S.; Johnson, A. O.; Smith, S. N.; White, A. N.; Brauer, A. L.; Learman, B. S.; Zhao, L.; Wu, W.; Anderson, M. T.; Bachman, M. A.; Mobley, H. L. (2019). "Twin arginine translocation, ammonia incorporation, and polyamine biosynthesis are crucial for Proteus mirabilis fitness during bloodstream infection". PLOS Pathogens. 15 (4) e1007653. doi:10.1371/journal.ppat.1007653. PMC 6497324. PMID 31009518.
11. Holmes, C. L.; Wilcox, A. E.; Forsyth, V.; Smith, S. N.; Moricz, B. S.; Unverdorben, L. V.; Mason, S.; Wu, W.; Zhao, L.; Mobley, H. L.; Bachman, M. A. (2023). "Klebsiella pneumoniae causes bacteremia using factors that mediate tissue-specific fitness and resistance to oxidative stress". PLOS Pathogens. 19 (7) e1011233. doi:10.1371/journal.ppat.1011233. PMC 10381055. PMID 37463183.
12. Brown, A. N.; Anderson, M. T.; Smith, S. N.; Bachman, M. A.; Mobley HLT (2023). "Conserved metabolic regulator ArcA responds to oxygen availability, iron limitation, and cell envelope perturbations during bacteremia". mBio. 14 (5): e0144823. doi:10.1128/mbio.01448-23. PMC 10653796. PMID 37681955.

Helicobacter pylori, a gram-negative, microaerophilic, spiral-shaped bacterium is the most frequently cited etiologic agent of human gastritis and peptic ulceration. This species, whose niche is highly restricted to the gastric mucosa of humans, has adopted a strategy of survival that includes synthesis of urease as its most abundant cellular protein. This enzyme hydrolyzes urea, releasing ammonia, which allows colonization of this acid-sensitive organism at low gastric pH. In addition, urease is a key protein used for detection of the organism by measuring serum antibody to the protein, enzyme activity directly in a gastric biopsy, or a product of hydrolysis (^{13}CO_{2}) using a urea breath test. The Mobley lab conducted extensive characterization of H. pylori's most critical virulence factor. The urease of H. pylori is related to that of Proteus mirabilis, but also displays differences. The enzyme is composed of 12 copies of two subunits of 61 kDa and 27 kDa. Accessory proteins are also required for activation of the apoenzyme by nickel ion insertion. An additional gene necessary for production of highly active urease was discovered and encoded a single component nickel transport system. NixA (for "nickel crossing") actively imports nickel ions into the bacterium. A topological model for the insertion of NixA, the high affinity nickel transport protein, into the cytoplasmic membrane was established, and amino acid residues within the membrane domain that are critical for transport function were identified. Thus, NixA (nickel transporter) is necessary for full activation of H. pylori urease. A model for such activation requires recruitment of nickel ions on the cell surface, delivery across the outer membrane and periplasmic space, active transport across the cytoplasmic membrane, establishment of a reservoir of the metal ion in the cytosol, and finally insertion into the catalytic site of the newly synthesized apoenzyme. Since urea hydrolysis is 100%-dependent on nickel incorporation into urease, nickel import by NixA and other transporters is essential. The Mobley Lab completed its work on H. pylori in 2006.

1. Mobley, H. L.; Cortesia, M. J.; Rosenthal, L. E.; Jones, B. D. (1988). "Characterization of urease from Campylobacter pylori". Journal of Clinical Microbiology. 26 (5): 831–836. doi:10.1128/jcm.26.5.831-836.1988. PMC 266469. PMID 3384908.
2. Hu, L. T.; Mobley, H. L. (1990). "Purification and N-terminal analysis of urease from Helicobacter pylori". Infection and Immunity. 58 (4): 992–998. doi:10.1128/iai.58.4.992-998.1990. PMC 258572. PMID 2318539.
3. Mobley, H. L.; Garner, R. M.; Bauerfeind, P. (1995). "Helicobacter pylori nickel-transport gene nixA: Synthesis of catalytically active urease in Escherichia coli independent of growth conditions". Molecular Microbiology. 16 (1): 97–109. doi:10.1111/j.1365-2958.1995.tb02395.x. PMID 7651142.
4. Fulkerson Jr, J. F.; Mobley, H. L. (2000). "Membrane Topology of the NixA Nickel Transporter of Helicobacter pylori: Two Nickel Transport-Specific Motifs within Transmembrane Helices II and III". Journal of Bacteriology. 182 (6): 1722–1730. doi:10.1128/JB.182.6.1722-1730.2000. PMC 94471. PMID 10692379.

PUBLISHED BOOKS

1. Urinary Tract Infections: Pathogenesis and Clinical Management. 1996. H.L.T. Mobley and J. W. Warren, editors. American Society for Microbiology, Washington DC (440 pages).

2. Helicobacter pylori: Methods in Molecular Medicine. 1997. Chris L. Clayton and Harry L.T. Mobley, editors. Humana Press, Totowa, NJ (274 pages).

3. 10th International Workshop on Campylobacter, Helicobacter & Related Organisms. Proceedings on CD-ROM. 2000. Harry Mobley, David McGee and Irving Nachamkin (eds.). Automated Graphdics. Baltimore, Maryland.

4. Helicobacter pylori: Physiology and Genetics. 2001. Harry L.T. Mobley, George L. Mendz, and Stuart L. Hazell (eds.). 608 pages. American Society for Microbiology. Washington, D.C.

5. Colonization of Mucosal Surfaces. 2005. James Nataro, Paul Cohen, Jeffrey Weiser, and Harry L.T. Mobley (eds.). 456 pages. American Society for Microbiology, Washington, DC.

6. Encyclopedia of Microbiology, 4th Edition. 2019. Thomas Schmidt, Harry L.T. Mobley, Bianca Brahamsha, James Brown, Larry Forney, Robert Haselkorn, Jennie Hunter-Cevera, Stanley Maloy, Beth McCormick, Carlos Pedros Alio (eds.). 3199 pages. Elsevier.

== Awards and honors ==
- 2002: Elected Fellow, American Academy of Microbiology
- 2004: Outstanding Mentor Award, University of Maryland, Baltimore
- 2004–2019: Frederick G. Novy Collegiate Professorship and Chair, University of Michigan Medical School
- 2010–11: President, Association of Medical School Microbiology and Immunology Chairs
- 2011: Candidate for President-Elect, American Society for Microbiology
- 2012: Recipient, University of Michigan Postdoctoral Association Excellence in Mentorship Faculty Award
- 2012: Inductee, Atherton High School Alumni Association Hall of Fame, Louisville, Kentucky
- 2012: Elected Fellow, American Association for the Advancement of Science (AAAS)
- 2014: Named Frederick G. Novy Distinguished University Professor by the Regents of the University of Michigan
- 2017: Named American Society for Microbiology Distinguished Lecturer
- 2019: Named Frederick G. Novy Distinguished University Professor (endowed chair)
