= D12-methyl RNA motif =

D12-methyl
- Consensus secondary structure and sequence conservation of D12-methyl RNA

Identifiers
- Symbol: D12-methyl
- Rfam: RF02950

Other data
- RNA type: Gene; sRNA
- SO: SO:0001263
- PDB structures: PDBe

The D12-methyl RNA motif is a conserved RNA structure that was discovered by bioinformatics. D12-methyl motifs are found in metagenomic DNA samples, and have not yet been found in a classified organism.

It is ambiguous whether D12-methyl RNAs function as cis-regulatory elements or whether they operate in trans. On the one hand, they are located upstream of protein-coding genes of a variety of types. This fact could suggest that D12-methyl RNAs function in cis. However, many of the associated genes are typical of those located in prophages. Since phage genomes often consist of a small number of large operons, it is possible that the D12-methyl RNAs are simply one of the genetic elements in a long, phage transcriptional unit.
