= Cyanophage N-1 =

Virus classification
- Group: Group I (dsDNA)
- Order: Caudovirales
- Family: Myoviridae
- Genus: Cyanomyovirus (proposed)
- Species: Cyanophage N-1

Species of virus

Cyanophage N-1 is a myovirus bacteriophage that infects freshwater filamentous cyanobacteria of the Nostoc genus. The virus was first isolated by Kenneth Adolph and Robert Haselkorn in 1971 in the US, from the nitrogen-fixing cyanobacterium, Nostoc muscorum. N-1 is closely related to cyanophage A-1, but only distantly to other cyanophages of freshwater or marine origin.

== Structure ==
The virus has a polyhedral head with a diameter of around 61 nm. The contractile tail is 100 nm long, and is attached to the head via a tail capital. The neck region bears fibres. The mature virus particle contains at least 19 proteins.

== Genome ==
The linear, double-stranded DNA genome is 64,960 base pairs in length – only half the size of most phages with contractile tails, which typically fall in the range 161–231 kb. It has a GC-content of 35.4%. Of the 91 open reading frames (ORFs), only 33 show similarity to other known sequences. Remarkably, the genome of Cyanophage N1 encodes a functional CRISPR array, which has been suggested to protect the host against infection by competing viruses.

== Life cycle and interaction with the host ==
The optimal pH for viral adsorption to N. muscorum is 7.6–8.1. The rate of adsorption is reduced with increasing age of the host cells. The viral latent period is 7 hours, which is similar to cyanophages of the LPP-1 group. The burst size is 100 plaque-forming units per cell.

Host photosynthesis is required for the virus to replicate, with photosynthesis being required throughout the life cycle, rather than at any particular point. Viral replication is powered by cyclic photophosphorylation and the use of carbohydrate stores; photosystem II activity is not required. Cyanophage N-1 infection of N. muscorum is associated with several changes in the host's carbon and nitrogen metabolism, including an increase in glucose-6-phosphate dehydrogenase enzyme concentration and a decrease in glutamine synthetase activity.
