= Moron (bacteriophage) =

A moron, in the context of bacteriophage genetics, is an extra gene in a prophage genome without a function in the phage's lysogenic cycle. These genes may code for products beneficial to the phage's bacterial host, as with the example of gp15 of phage HK97 serving as a superinfection exclusion protein. The term moron comes from the notion that the additional genes mean that these bacteriophage genomes have "more on" them.
