= Thermodesulfovibrio aggregans =

Scientific classification
- Domain: Bacteria
- Kingdom: Pseudomonadati
- Phylum: Nitrospirota
- Class: Thermodesulfovibrionia
- Order: Thermodesulfovibrionales
- Family: Thermodesulfovibrionaceae
- Genus: Thermodesulfovibrio
- Species: T. aggregans

Binomial name
- Thermodesulfovibrio aggregans Sekiguchi et al. 2008

Species of bacterium

Thermodesulfovibrio aggregans is a species of bacterium.

== Discovery ==
Thermodesulfovibrio aggregans was discovered by Sekiguchi et al. in 2008 while researching thermophilic sulfate reducing bacteria that was present in anaerobic wastewater treatment systems in Japan. Researchers studying bacterial communities in these wastewater treatment environments isolated the organism from Thermophilic methanogenic sludge granules which are dense microbial aggregates that form in wastewater treatment reactors in anaerobic conditions. In these dense wastewater bacterial communities, different microorganisms in these communities perform specialized metabolic roles such as sulfate reduction and methane production, allowing the ecosystem to function as a community under anaerobic conditions.

== Isolation ==
To study the bacteria, researchers in Japan cultured the bacterium under anaerobic laboratory conditions and conducted multi-step experiments to figure out the taxonomic classification. Sequencing Thermodesulfovibrio aggregans 16S rRNA gene proved that it is in the Thermodesulfovibrio genus, which are a group of bacteria that are sulfate-reducing associated with high-temperature anaerobic environments. However, genetic sequencing showed that the isolates of Thermodesulfovibrio aggregans were genetically different from previously discovered species within the genus. Because of these differences, this new organism was given the name Thermodesulfovibrio aggregans, with the specific strain name given as TGE-P1. The species name aggregans originates from Thermodesulfovibrio aggregans capability to form cell clusters during growth and replication.

== Taxonomy and phylogeny ==
Thermodesulfovibrio aggregans was originally placed in the Nitrospirae phylum according to 16s rRNA completed in 2008. Starting in 2015, however, a lot of bacteria phylum groups began adopting the suffix "ota" as large scaled genome projects began reorganizing bacterial taxonomy using whole genome comparisons. As a result of this change, the phylum Nitrospirae was reclassified as Nitrosporita. The phylum Nitrosporita primarily contains chemolithotrophs and anaerobes that partake in the nitrogen, sulfur, and iron cycle. There are three primary classes within Nitrosporita including Nitrospiria, Leptospirillia, and Thermodesulfovibrionia. The species T. aggregans falls into the Thermodesulfovibrionia class, and most of the bacteria within this class are thermophilic, anaerobic, and sulfate-reducing. Within this class, there is only one order, family, and genus which is Thermodesulfovibrionales, Thermodesulfovibrionaceae, and Thermodesulfovibrio respectively.

Within the genus Thermodesulfovibrio, there are 8 published species including, T. aggregans, T. yellowstoni, T. Islandicus, T. hydrogenphilus, T. yellowstonii subsp. denitrificans, T. thiophilus, and T. acidaminovorans. T. yellowstoni is a thermophilic anaerobe and is the most well known and studied species within the Thermodesulfovibrio genus. T. yellowstoni was first discovered in the Yellowstone National Park Hotsprings in 1994 and demonstrated that sulfate reduction is possible in bacteria within the Nitrospirota phylum. Prior to this discovery, sulfate reduction was only viewed in the more commonly studied sulfate reducers Proteobacteria. Another prominent member of the Thermodesulfovibrio genus is T. islandicus. T. islandicus was first discovered in Icelandic hot spring sediments and similar to T. yellowstoni, T. islandicus is also thermophilic, anaerobic, and sulfate reducing. The species T. thiophilus is the closest neighbor species of T. aggregans. T. thiophilus was first discovered from samples of Thermophilic methanogenic sludge in anaerobic digesters. It was determined that T. aggregans is most closely related to T. thiophilus based on their phylogeny. 16s rRNA gene sequencing showed that T. thiophilius shares the highest sequence similarity to T. aggregans out of all of the species in the Thermodesulfovibrio genus. Furthermore, DNA–DNA hybridization showed moderate to high similarity between T. thiophilus and T. aggregans demonstrating that their closely related but still distinct species. T. yellowstoni, T. islandicus, T. thiophilus and T. aggregans all share a similar metabolism and physiology, however, they are found in different ecological niches. T. yellowstoni and T. islandicus are found in natural geothermal environments while T. aggregans and T. thiophilus are found in engineered environments such as thermophilic anaerobic sludge reactors.

== Cell structure and morphology ==
=== Morphology ===
T. aggregans has a curved rod (vibrioid) shape and is approximately 0.3–0.5 µm wide and 1.5–3.0 µm long. Its cells are elongated with a slender and comma-like appearance. T. aggregans is often found in aggregates and can form small clusters. T. aggregans also uses a flagella for motility, is gram-negative, and is non-spore forming.

=== Genome ===
The genome of T.aggregans consists of 2.0-2.3 megabases and 34%-35% gc content. Additionally, its genome contains 1900-2100 protein-coding genes. One important gene in T. aggregans for sulfate reduction is sulfate adenylyltransferase which activates sulfate to adenosine 5 phosphosulfate. Another gene in T. aggregans essential for sulfate reduction is adenylylsulfate which converts adenosine 5 phosphosulfate to sulfite. Finally, the gene dissimilatory sulfite reductase reduces sulfite to hydrogen sulfide (H₂S).

== Metabolism ==
Since T. aggregans is a sulfate reducing microbe, meaning that T. aggregans uses sulfate as its final electron acceptor during anaerobic respiration. T. aggregans can also oxidize several substrates to generate energy including lactate, pyruvate, and hydrogen. The sulfate reduction pathway in T. aggregans involves three primary steps, the first step in the process is sulfate activation in which sulfate is turned into adenosine 5′ phosphosulfate. Next, the adenosine 5’ phosphosulfate is reduced to sulfite with the help of the enzyme APS. Finally, sulfite is reduced to the electron acceptor hydrogen sulfide which is released into the environment with the help of the enzyme dissimilatory sulfite reductase.

Also discovered was that T. aggregans can live in microbial communities with other organisms and interact with other microbes to improve its metabolic processes. For instance, fermentative bacteria that live in its ecosystem can break down organic matter to hydrogen or lactate which T.aggregans can use to reduce sulfate. This is beneficial for both parties as it prevents accumulation of fermented biproducts such as lactate and hydrogen and allows microbes to extract more energy from organic matter.

== Ecology and habitat ==
Thermodesulfovibrio aggregans is capable of influencing both wastewater treatment and renewable energy production. As mentioned previously, T. aggregans are found in thermophilic anaerobic digesters which are used in wastewater treatment plants to break down organic waste. T. aggregans alongside its community of microorganisms in the thermophilic anaerobic digesters work to break down organic matter. The anaerobic digester's ability to break down organic matter is significant as it helps clean sewage before it is released into streams, rivers, and the ocean. Additionally, breaking down organic matter helps reduce environmental pollution. T. aggregans also helps anaerobic digesters convert organic waste into gasses such as methane which can be used as a source of renewable fuel. Together, these roles demonstrate the importance of T. aggregans to our environment and its potential to generate renewable energy.

=== Host range ===
Since T. aggregans is a thermophilic anaerobe, it is typically found in high temperature and oxygen free environments. T. aggregans reach optimal growth between 55-65 degrees celsius. T. aggregans has been only found in thermophilic methanogenic sludge which is produced from anaerobic digesters used for wastewater treatment and biogas production.

== Importance and possible applications ==
Thermodesulfovibrio aggregans plays an important role within thermophilic anaerobic digesters, which are widely used in wastewater treatment systems. Rather than acting alone, T. aggregans functions as part of a complex microbial community that collectively breaks down organic matter under anaerobic conditions. Studying T. aggregans contributes to our understanding of sulfate-reducing and syntrophic processes that occur during anaerobic digestion. These processes influence how efficiently organic waste is degraded and how metabolic intermediates, such as hydrogen and acetate, are cycled between microorganisms. By better understanding the metabolic role of organisms like T. aggregans, researchers can gain insight into how microbial interactions affect the overall performance of anaerobic digesters. This has implications for improving wastewater treatment efficiency and optimizing conditions for biogas production, including methane, which is used as a renewable energy source.
