= Dissimilatory sulfite reductase =

Class of enzymes

dissimilatory sulfite reductase

Identifiers
- EC no.: 1.8.1.22

Databases
- BRENDA: enzyme data
- ExPASy: NiceZyme view
- KEGG: enzyme entry
- MetaCyc: metabolic pathway
- Rhea: reactions
- PDB structures: RCSB PDB PDBe PDBsum
- Gene Ontology: AmiGO / QuickGO
Search
- PMC: articles
- PubMed: articles
- NCBI: proteins

Dissimilatory sulfite reductase (EC 1.8.1.22) is an enzyme that participates in sulfur metabolism in dissimilatory sulfate reduction.

Overview of dissimilatory sulfate reduction performed by sulfate-reducing microorganisms.

The enzyme is essential in prokaryotic sulfur-based energy metabolism, including sulfate/sulfite reducing organisms, sulfur-oxidizing bacteria, and organosulfonate reducers. In sulfur reducers, it catalyses the reduction of sulfite to sulfide (reaction 1); while in sulfur oxidizers, it catalyses the opposite reaction (reaction 2). The reaction involves the small protein DsrC, which is present in all the organisms that contain dissimilatory sulfite reductase. During the process, an intramolecular trisulfide is formed between two L-cysteine residues of DsrC and the sulfur atom from sulfite. This trisulfide can be reduced by a number of proteins including DsrK and TcmB.

DsrAB has been found in 32 bacterial and 4 to 5 archaeal phyla. DsrA and DsrC have been found as auxiliary metabolic genes in bacteriophages.

Reaction in organisms performing dissimilatory sulfate reduction:

1 (overall reaction)
SO^{2−}_{3} + [DsrC]-(SH)_{2} + 2 acceptor_{red} + 2H^{+} → H_{2}S + [DsrC]-S_{2} + 2 acceptor_{ox} + 3H_{2}O 1a
SO^{2−}_{3} + [DsrC]-(SH)_{2} + 2 acceptor_{red} + 2H^{+} → [DsrC]-Cys-S-HS* + 2 acceptor_{ox} + 3H_{2}O 1b
[DsrC]-Cys-S-HS* → H_{2}S + [DsrC]-S_{2}

Reaction in organisms performing sulfur oxidation:

2 (overall reaction)
[DsrC]-Cys-S-HS* + 3 acceptor_{ox} + 3H_{2}O → SO^{2−}_{3} + [DsrC]-S_{2} + 3 acceptor_{red} + 2H^{+} 2a
[DsrC]-Cys-S-HS* + 3 acceptor_{ox} + 3H_{2}O → [DsrC]-Cys-S-SO_{3} + 3 acceptor_{red} + H^{+} 2b
[DsrC]-Cys-S-SO_{3} → SO^{2−}_{3} + [DsrC]-S_{2} + H^{+}

The systematic name of this enzyme class is hydrogen-sulfide:[DsrC sulfur-carrier protein], acceptor oxidoreductase.

This enzyme is different from EC 1.8.1.2 – assimilatory sulfite reductase (NADPH), and EC 1.8.7.1 – assimilatory sulfite reductase (ferredoxin), which are involved in sulfate assimilation.
