= Soil enzyme =

Soil enzymes are a group of enzymes found in soil. They are excreted by soil microbes such as fungi, bacteria and archaea, and play a key role in decomposing soil organic matter into humus, in the process releasing nutrients essential for the growth of plants. Some soil enzymes such as ureases may be inhibited by ingredients in fertiliser to delay release of the nutrients over an extended period.

== Distribution ==
The distribution of soil enzymes is highly heterogeneous, varying at millimetric scale according to the distribution of patches of nutrients and microbial biomass, plant roots, or colonies of specific microorganisms. Root tips are hotspots of cellulase and chitinase activities. Soil enzymes are bound to clay and humic colloids which protect them against rapid degradation, although to the detriment of their activity with clay minerals, resulting in a trade-off between protection and activity. Soil enzymes also varies in concentration at meter (single-tree) to kilometer (catchment) scales in forested areas, with patterns of spatial variation specific to each enzyme system, and according to biomes in a given region.

== Functions ==
Soil enzymes catalyse many biochemical reactions, degrading organic compounds (e.g. cellulose, lignin, starch, urea) and thus being prominent agents of nutrient cycles (e.g. carbon and nitrogen cycles). Soil enzymes are intracellular, cell-associated or free enzymes produced by soil microorganisms, which use them to degrade macromolecules (e.g. cellulose, lignin, chitin) after-death produced by plants and animals, in order to ensure their growth and reproduction. As such they play a decisive role in the maintenance of soil health.
