= Lysogen =

Bacteria

A lysogen or lysogenic bacteria is a bacterial cell that can produce and transfer the ability to produce a phage. A prophage is either integrated into the host bacteria's chromosome or more rarely exists as a stable plasmid within the host cell. The prophage expresses gene(s) that repress the phage's lytic action, until this repression is disrupted (see lytic cycle). Currently a variety of studies are being conducted to see whether other genes are active during lysogeny, examples of which include phage-encoded tRNA and virulence genes.

== History ==
Theories about Lysogeny dominated the field of microbiology between 1920 and 1929. However, lysogenic bacteria were first brought to light by studies conducted in 1921 that explored the mechanisms between phages and bacteria.

== Lysogenic Conversion ==
Lysogenic conversion is a process that occurs between a bacterium and a phage that is often beneficial for the bacteria. In lysogenic conversion, the phage inserts specific characteristics into the bacterial genes causing the bacteria to have better survival. Lysogenic conversion has been known to convert non-pathogenic bacteria into pathogenic bacteria that is capable of producing harmful toxins.

== Types ==
- Lambda phage

== See also ==
- lysogenic cycle
