= Sulfite reductase (ferredoxin) =

Identifiers
- EC no.: 1.8.7.1
- CAS no.: 37256-50-1

Databases
- IntEnz: IntEnz view
- BRENDA: BRENDA entry
- ExPASy: NiceZyme view
- KEGG: KEGG entry
- MetaCyc: metabolic pathway
- PRIAM: profile
- PDB structures: RCSB PDB PDBe PDBsum
Search
- PMC: articles
- PubMed: articles
- NCBI: proteins

Sulfite reductase (ferredoxin) (EC 1.8.7.1, ferredoxin-sulfite reductase) is an enzyme with systematic name hydrogen-sulfide:ferredoxin oxidoreductase. This enzyme catalises the following chemical reaction

hydrogen sulfide + 6 oxidized ferredoxin + 3 H_{2}O $\rightleftharpoons$ sulfite + 6 reduced ferredoxin + 6 H^{+}

This sulfite reductase is an iron protein.
