= Robert Haselkorn =

American molecular biologist (1934-2025)

- Born: November 7, 1934; Brooklyn, New York, U.S.
- Died: February 10, 2025 (aged 90); Chicago, Illinois, U.S.
- Education: Princeton University; Harvard University
- Known for: Cyanobacterial molecular genetics Nitrogen fixation and heterocyst development Plant viral RNA biology
- Awards: National Academy of Sciences (1991); American Academy of Arts and Sciences; American Academy of Microbiology; Gregor Mendel Medal in Biological Science
- Scientific career
- Fields: Molecular biology Microbiology
- Workplaces: University of Chicago
- Doctoral advisor: Paul Mead Doty

Robert Haselkorn (1934–2025) was an American molecular biologist and microbiologist who spent his career at the University of Chicago, where he helped establish cyanobacteria as model organisms for studies of nitrogen fixation, photosynthesis, and prokaryotic development. His work helped establish cyanobacterial molecular genetics and contributed broadly to molecular biology through early advances in viral RNA biology, genome sequencing, and gene regulation.

== Early life and education ==
Robert Haselkorn was born in 1934 in Brooklyn, New York, and grew up in the city, where he attended James Madison High School. He earned an AB degree from Princeton University in 1956, where he was active as coxswain on the university's crew team. He then pursued graduate studies in biochemistry at Harvard University, completing his PhD in 1959 under the supervision of Paul Doty during the formative years of molecular biology. While at Harvard, Haselkorn was introduced to nucleic acid research and developed a lasting interest in the structure and function of RNA, which would shape his subsequent scientific career.

== Research and career ==
After completing postdoctoral research at the Agricultural Research Council in Cambridge, England, Robert Haselkorn joined the University of Chicago faculty in 1961, where he spent his entire academic career. He held appointments in biophysics, molecular genetics and cell biology, and chemistry, and was later named a Distinguished Service Professor. Over more than four decades at Chicago, he established a research program spanning virology, microbiology, and molecular genetics, while mentoring generations of students and postdoctoral researchers.

Haselkorn's early work focused on plant RNA viruses and bacteriophages, including studies of viral structure and gene expression. This research led to the identification and characterization of cyanophages and, in turn, to the adoption of cyanobacteria as experimental systems for molecular genetic analysis. He was among the first to establish filamentous cyanobacteria as model organisms for investigating photosynthesis, nitrogen fixation, and cellular differentiation.

A central contribution of Haselkorn's career was demonstrating that heterocysts are the sites of nitrogen fixation in filamentous cyanobacteria. His laboratory subsequently elucidated genetic and regulatory mechanisms controlling heterocyst differentiation, pattern formation, and metabolic exchange between cells, work that helped define the field of cyanobacterial developmental biology.

As molecular biology techniques advanced, Haselkorn incorporated recombinant DNA and genomic approaches into his research. His group contributed to early efforts in gene cloning, genome sequencing, and functional annotation in prokaryotes, and later studied conserved metabolic enzymes such as acetyl-CoA carboxylase across bacteria, plants, and eukaryotes. He also co-founded biotechnology companies and held patents related to his research, reflecting a sustained interest in applied science.

In addition to his research, Haselkorn played a prominent role in scientific education and service. He was closely associated with the Marine Biological Laboratory for more than five decades as a researcher, instructor, and trustee, and was widely recognized for his commitment to teaching and mentorship.

== Honors and service ==
- Elected to the National Academy of Sciences (1991)
- Elected to the American Academy of Arts and Sciences (1987)
- Elected to the American Association for the Advancement of Science (1984)
- Elected to the American Philosophical Society
- Recipient of the Gregor Mendel Medal in Biological Science from the Academy of Sciences of the Czech Republic
- Awarded a John Simon Guggenheim Memorial Foundation Fellowship
- Recipient of the Quantrell Award for Excellence in Undergraduate Teaching at the University of Chicago (twice)
- Served on the Board of Trustees of the Marine Biological Laboratory (2003–2010; 2012–2015), and named Trustee Emeritus (2015)
