= Sulfite reductase (NADPH) =

Enzyme with systematic name hydrogen-sulfide:NADP+ oxidoreductase

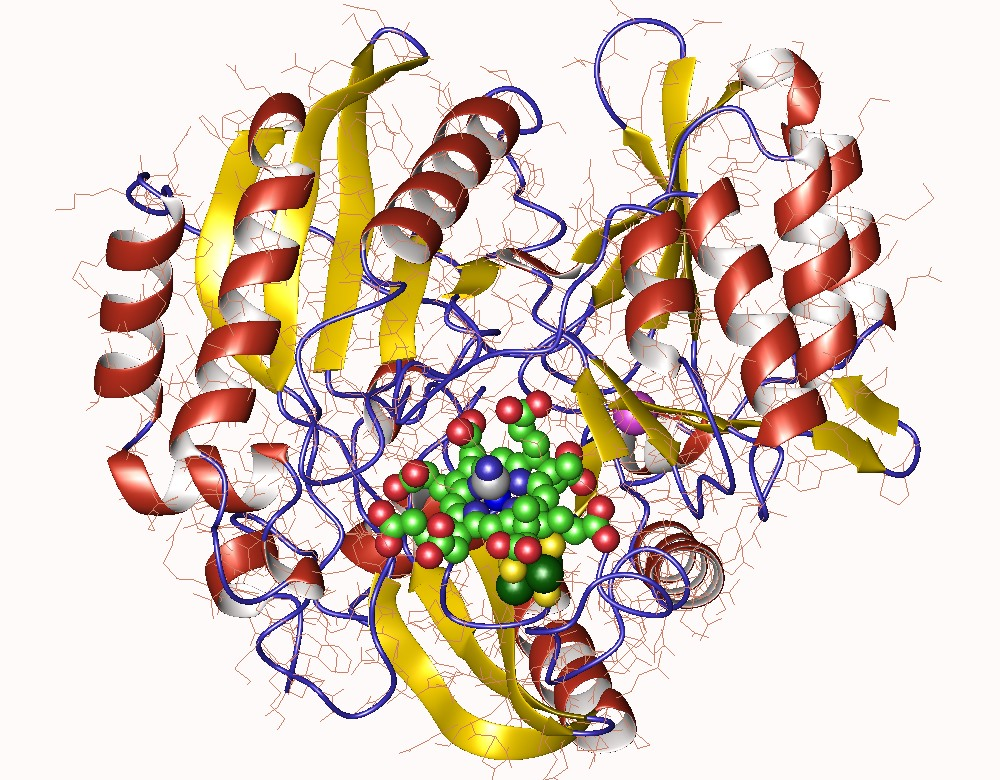
- Sulfite reductase monomer, E.Coli

Identifiers
- EC no.: 1.8.1.2
- CAS no.: 9029-35-0

Databases
- IntEnz: IntEnz view
- BRENDA: BRENDA entry
- ExPASy: NiceZyme view
- KEGG: KEGG entry
- MetaCyc: metabolic pathway
- PRIAM: profile
- PDB structures: RCSB PDB PDBe PDBsum
Search
- PMC: articles
- PubMed: articles
- NCBI: proteins

Sulfite reductase (NADPH) (EC 1.8.1.2, sulfite (reduced nicotinamide adenine dinucleotide phosphate) reductase, NADPH-sulfite reductase, NADPH-dependent sulfite reductase, H_{2}S-NADP oxidoreductase, sulfite reductase (NADPH_{2})) is an enzyme with systematic name hydrogen-sulfide:NADP^{+} oxidoreductase. This enzyme catalises the following chemical reaction:

hydrogen sulfide + 3 NADP^{+} + 3 H_{2}O $\rightleftharpoons$ sulfite + 3 NADPH + 3 H^{+}

Sulfite reductase is an iron flavoprotein (FAD and FMN).
