= Ped =

Aggregates of soil particles formed naturally

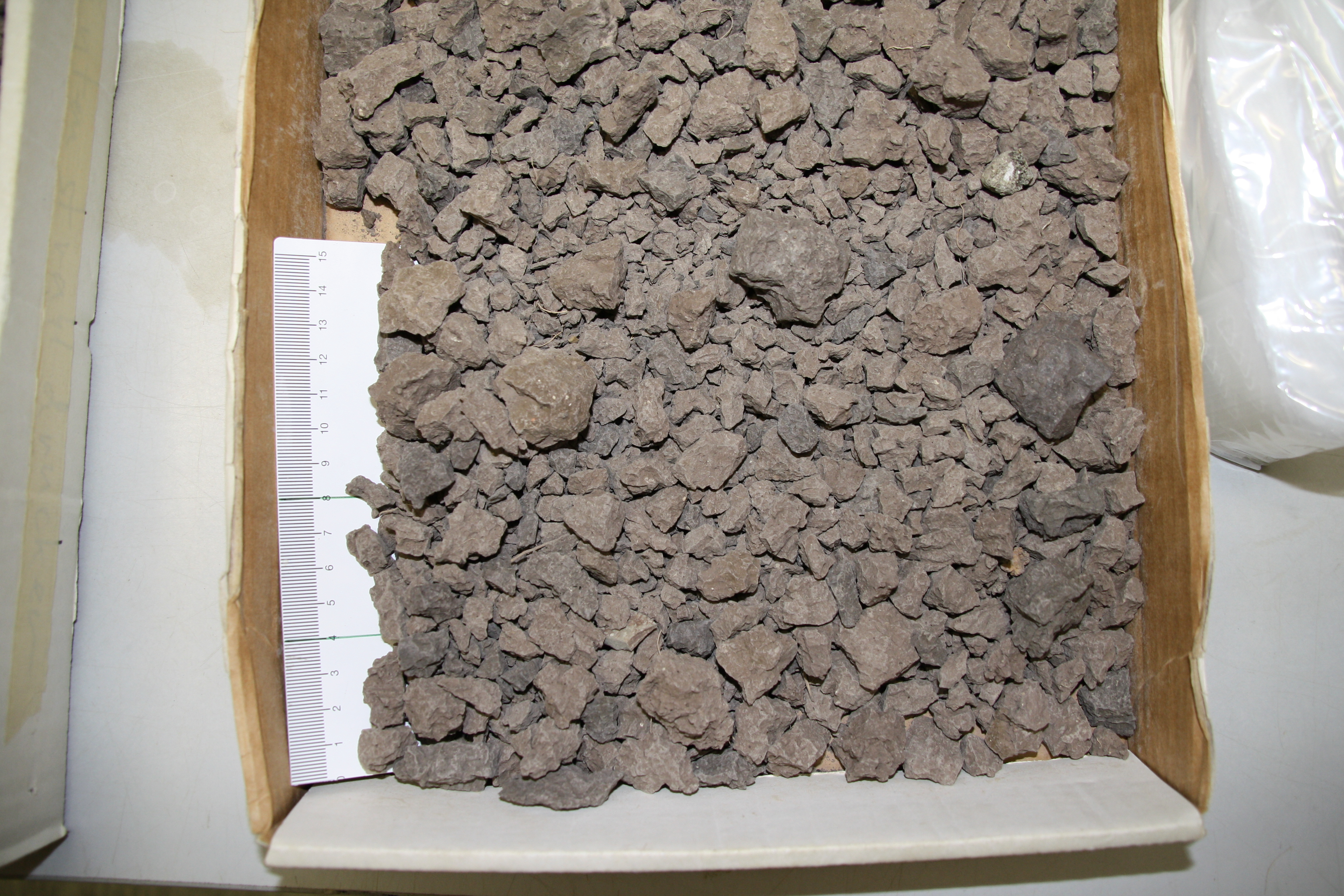
Blocky peds

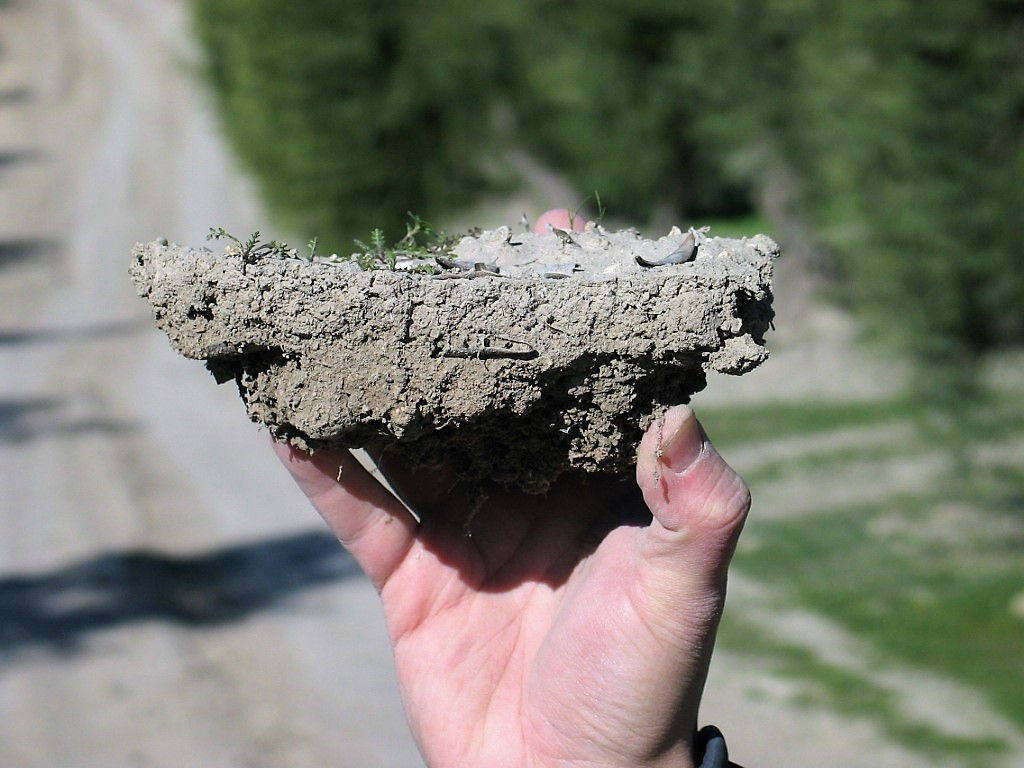
Soil aggregate in Spain

In soil science, peds are aggregates of soil particles formed naturally as a result of pedogenic processes; this natural organization of particles forms discrete units separated by pores or voids. The term is generally used for macroscopic (visible; i.e. greater than 1 mm in size) structural units when soils are observed in the field. Soil peds should be described when the soil is dry or slightly moist, as they can be difficult to distinguish when wet. An artificially formed aggregate of soil particles can be called a clod.

There are five major classes of macrostructure seen in soils: platy, prismatic, columnar, granular, and blocky. There are also structureless conditions. Some soils have simple structure, each unit being an entity without component smaller units. Others have compound structure, in which large units are composed of smaller units separated by persistent planes of weakness.

== See also ==
- Soil structure
- Soil type
- Soil horizon
