= Prophage =

Bacteriophage genome that is integrated into a bacterial cell

Formation of a prophage

A prophage is a bacteriophage (often shortened to "phage") genome that is integrated into the circular bacterial chromosome or exists as an extrachromosomal plasmid within the bacterial cell. Integration of prophages into the bacterial host is the characteristic step of the lysogenic cycle of temperate phages.

Lysogeny is common in nature. Most wild strains of bacteria have one or more prophages, and viral DNA can make up a considerable portion of a bacterial genome. A bacterial host with an active prophage element is called a lysogen; a bacterial cell that harbors more than one prophage is called a polylysogen. Active prophages can remain latent in the genome through multiple cell divisions until activation by an external factor, leading to production of new phage particles that will lyse the cell and spread. Cryptic prophages are inactive prophage elements that do not result in phage particle production or cell lysis. These prophages are effectively 'trapped' in the chromosome of the host.

As ubiquitous mobile genetic elements, prophages play important roles in bacterial genetics and evolution, such as in the acquisition of virulence factors.

== Prophage induction ==
Active prophages can excise themselves from the bacterial chromosome in a process called prophage induction. This can occur spontaneously or as a result of external stressors, such as changes in temperature, pH, or the availability of nutrients. Prophage induction is also associated with DNA damage and the prokaryotic SOS response. After induction, viral replication begins via the lytic cycle. In the lytic cycle, the virus commandeers the cell's reproductive machinery. The cell may fill with new viruses until it lyses or bursts, or it may release the new viruses one at a time in an exocytotic process. The period from infection to lysis is termed the latent period.

Prophage induction can be triggered artificially by inducing cellular stress, for example by subjecting a microbial colony to UV light, antibiotics, or DNA-damaging chemicals such as Mitomycin C. Cell death due to lysis and subsequent viral plaque formation can be used to detect the presence of active prophages. However, such approaches do not always guarantee the absence of an inducible prophage. For example, Bacteriophage P2 is not inducible by UV.

Prophages are important agents of horizontal gene transfer, and are considered part of the mobilome. Genes are transferred via transduction when the prophage genome is imperfectly excised from the host chromosome and integrated into a new host (specialized transduction) or as fragments of host DNA are packaged into the phage particles and introduced into a new host (generalized transduction).

All families of bacterial viruses that have circular (single-stranded or double-stranded) DNA genomes or replicate their genomes through rolling circle replication (e.g., Caudovirales) have temperate members.

During infections by the bacterial pathogen Clostridioides difficile, spontaneous prophage release from the bacterial chromosome is common. The presence of deoxycholic acid in the intestinal environment can promote induction of C. difficle biofilm formation as well as the induction of prophage release.

== Zygotic induction ==
Zygotic induction occurs when a bacterial cell carrying the DNA of a bacterial virus transfers its own DNA along with the viral DNA (prophage) into the new host cell. This has the effect of causing the host cell to break apart. The DNA of the bacterial cell is silenced before entry into the cell by a repressor protein which is encoded for by the prophage. Upon the transfer of the bacterial cell's DNA into the host cell, the repressor protein is no longer encoded for, and the bacterial cell's original DNA is then turned on in the host cell. This mechanism eventually will lead to the release of the virus as the host cell splits open and the viral DNA is able to spread. This new discovery provided key insights into bacterial conjugation and contributed to the early repression model of gene regulation, which provided an explanation as to how the lac operon and λ bacteriophage genes are negatively regulated.

== Prophage reactivation ==
Bacteriophage λ is able to undergo a type of recombinational repair called prophage reactivation. Prophage reactivation can occur by recombination between a UV-damaged infecting phage λ chromosome and a homologous phage genome integrated into the bacterial DNA and existing in a prophage state. Prophage reactivation in the case of phage λ appears to be an accurate recombinational repair process that is mediated by the recA+ and red+ gene products.

== Cost/benefit to the host ==
Lysis of host cells during prophage induction can cause the collapse of a microbial population. Although induction of prophages results in the constant loss of individual cells in a bacterial population, the presence of a prophage can confer many beneficial functions to the host.

For example, induction of prophages allows hosts to compete in the microbial ecology by infecting and lysing susceptible bacteria. Phages also enable the host to pick up and integrate antibiotic resistance genes from nearby cells. Additionally, phages can enable the host to acquire virulence and pathogenicity genes. Modulation of biofilm formation is also affected by infection by lysogenic phages. Superinfection exclusion, or protection against infection by multiple phages, can be conferred by prophage integration. Additionally, phage-mediated recombination mechanisms may remodel the host chromosome and provide new ways for cells to regulate metabolism and gene expression, such as those involved in sporulation and competence.

Some prophages introduce addiction modules which can prevent their inactivation/removal from a lysogen. This behavior is seen in the P1 phage.

== Applications ==
Prophages can tell researchers a lot about the relationship between a bacterium and a host. With data from more nonpathogenic bacteria, researchers will be able to gather evidence as to whether or not prophages contribute to the survival value of the host. Prophage genomics has the potential to lead to ecological adaptations of the relationships between bacteria. Another important area of interest is the control of prophage gene expression with many of the lysogenic conversion genes (gene conversion) being tightly regulated. This process is capable of converting non-pathogenic bacteria into pathogenic bacteria that can now produce harmful toxins such as in staph infections. Since the specific mechanisms of prophage are not yet detailed, this research could provide the community with this tool for future research.

== Economic impact ==
Exotoxins encoded by prophages cause pathogenic outcomes in agriculture and aquaculture.

Prophage induction can result in cell losses in industrial processes. Commercially available type strains may also contain active prophages that may be undesirable.

== Elimination of prophages ==
Prophages can be eliminated from a bacterial population using techniques such as homologous recombination and toxin-based counterselection. For example, the SacB gene can be inserted in the prophage region of the genome. Bacteria with the SacB gene die when exposed to sucrose due to the creation of levansucrase. The small fraction of cells that spontaneously lose the prophage region will also lose the SacB gene. When sucrose is added, these 'cured' populations survive and can subsequently be cultured.

Engineered prophage-free strains can show increased robustness to environmental stressors compared to their unmodified counterparts.

== See also ==
- Provirus
- PhagesDB
