= Lysogenic cycle =

Process of virus reproduction

Lysogenic Cycle: 1. The prokaryotic cell is shown with its DNA, in green. 2. The bacteriophage attaches and releases its DNA, shown in red, into the prokaryotic cell. 3. The phage DNA then moves through the cell to the host's DNA. 4. The phage DNA integrates itself into the host cell's DNA, creating prophage. 5. The prophage then remains dormant until the host cell divides. 6. After the host cell has divided, the phage DNA in the daughter cells activate, and the phage DNA begins to express itself. Some of the cells containing the prophage go on to create new phages which will move on to infect other cells.

Lysogeny, or the lysogenic cycle, is one of two cycles of viral reproduction (the lytic cycle being the other). Lysogeny is characterized by integration of the bacteriophage nucleic acid into the host bacterium's genome or formation of a circular replicon in the bacterial cytoplasm. In this condition the bacterium continues to live and reproduce normally, while the bacteriophage lies in a dormant state in the host cell. The genetic material of the bacteriophage, called a prophage, can be transmitted to daughter cells at each subsequent cell division, and later events (such as UV radiation or the presence of certain chemicals) can release it, causing proliferation of new phages via the lytic cycle.

Lysogenic cycles can also occur in eukaryotes, although the method of DNA incorporation is not fully understood. For instance, the HIV viruses can either infect humans lytically, or lay dormant (lysogenic) as part of the infected cells' genome, keeping the ability to return to lysis at a later time.

The difference between lysogenic and lytic cycles is that, in lysogenic cycles, the spread of the viral DNA occurs through the usual prokaryotic reproduction, whereas a lytic cycle is more immediate in that it results in many copies of the virus being created very quickly and the cell is destroyed. One key difference between the lytic cycle and the lysogenic cycle is that the latter does not lyse the host cell straight away. Phages that replicate only via the lytic cycle are known as virulent phages while phages that replicate using both lytic and lysogenic cycles are known as temperate phages.

In the lysogenic cycle, the phage DNA first integrates into the bacterial chromosome to produce the prophage. When the bacterium reproduces, the prophage is also copied and is present in each of the daughter cells. The daughter cells can continue to replicate with the prophage present or the prophage can exit the bacterial chromosome to initiate the lytic cycle. In the lysogenic cycle the host DNA is not hydrolyzed but in the lytic cycle the host DNA is hydrolyzed in the lytic phase.

== Bacteriophages ==
Bacteriophages are viruses that infect and replicate within a bacterium. Temperate phages (such as lambda phage) can reproduce using both the lytic and the lysogenic cycle.

How a phage decides which cycle to enter depends on a variety of factors. For instance, if there are several other infecting phages (or if there is a high multiplicity), it is likely that the phage will use the lysogenic cycle. This may be useful in helping reduce the overall phage-to-host ratio and therefore preventing the phages from killing their hosts, also thereby increasing the phage's potential for survival, making this a form of natural selection. A phage may exit the chromosome and enter the lytic cycle if it is exposed to DNA-damaging agents, such as UV radiation and chemicals. Other factors with the potential to induce temperate phage release include temperature, pH, osmotic pressure, and low nutrient concentration. However, phages may also re-enter the lytic cycle spontaneously.

=== Evidence of lysogeny ===
It is sometimes possible to detect which cycle a phage enters by looking at the plaque morphology in bacterial plate culture. Generally, clearer plaques indicate more efficient lysis, while cloudy or turbid plaques indicate less efficient lysis. Turbid plaques may indicate that a phage can go through the lysogenic cycle, however there are other reasons that plaques may appear turbid.

Detection methods of phages released from the lysogenic cycle include electron microscopy, DNA extraction, or propagation on sensitive strains.

Via the lysogenic cycle, the bacteriophage's genome is not expressed and is instead integrated into the bacteria's genome to form the prophage. In its inactive form, a prophage gets passed on each time the host cell divides. If prophages become active, they can exit the bacterial chromosome and enter the lytic cycle, where they undergo DNA copying, protein synthesis, phage assembly, and lysis. Since the bacteriophage's genetic information is incorporated into the bacteria's genetic information as a prophage, the bacteriophage replicates passively as the bacterium divides to form daughter bacteria cells. In this scenario, the daughter bacteria cells contain prophage and are known as lysogens. Lysogens can remain in the lysogenic cycle for many generations but can switch to the lytic cycle at any time via a process known as induction. During induction, prophage DNA is excised from the bacterial genome and is transcribed and translated to make coat proteins for the virus and regulate lytic growth.

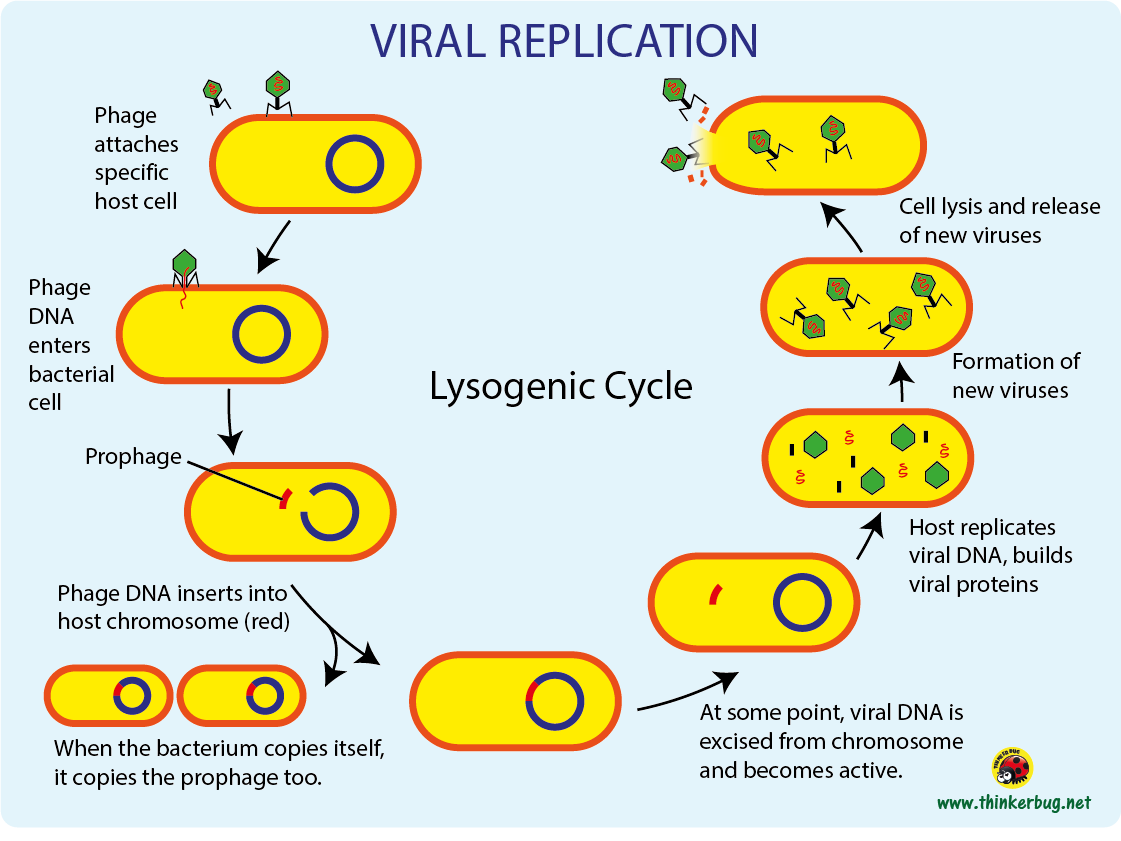
Lysogenic Cycle

An example of a virus that uses the lysogenic cycle to its advantage is the Herpes Simplex Virus. After first entering the lytic cycle and infecting a human host, it enters the lysogenic cycle. This allows it to travel to the nervous system's sensory neurons and remain undetected for long periods of time. In the case of genital herpes, latency is established in lumbosacral dorsal root ganglia, spinal nerve neurons. The herpes virus can then exit this dormant stage and re-enter the lytic cycle, causing disease symptoms. Thus, while herpes viruses can enter both the lytic and lysogenic cycles, latency allows the virus to survive and evade detection by the immune system due to low viral gene expression.

The model organism for studying lysogeny is the lambda phage. Prophage integration (also known as homologous recombination), maintenance of lysogeny, induction, and control of phage genome excision in induction is described in detail in the lambda phage article.

=== Fitness tradeoffs for bacteria ===
Bacteriophages are parasitic because they infect their hosts, use bacterial machinery to replicate, and ultimately lyse the bacteria. Temperate phages can lead to both advantages and disadvantages for their hosts via the lysogenic cycle. During the lysogenic cycle, the virus genome is incorporated as prophage and a repressor prevents viral replication. Nonetheless, a temperate phage can escape repression to replicate, produce viral particles, and lyse the bacteria. The temperate phage escaping repression would be a disadvantage for the bacteria. On the other hand, the prophage may transfer genes that enhance host virulence and resistance to the immune system. Also, the repressor produced by the prophage that prevents prophage genes from being expressed confers immunity for the host bacteria from lytic infection by related viruses.

Another system, arbitrium, has recently been described for bacteriophages infecting several Bacillus species, in which the decision between lysis and lysogeny is transmitted between bacteria by a peptide factor.

=== Lysogenic conversion ===
In some interactions between lysogenic phages and bacteria, the lysogenic conversion may occur, which can also be called phage conversion. It is when a temperate phage induces a change in the phenotype of the infected bacteria that is not part of a usual phage cycle. Changes can often involve the external membrane of the cell by making it impervious to other phages or even by increasing the pathogenic capability of the bacteria for a host. In this way, temperate bacteriophages also play a role in the spread of virulence factors, such as exotoxins and exoenzymes, amongst bacteria. This change then stays in the genome of the infected bacteria and is copied and passed down to daughter cells.

==== Bacterial survival ====
Lysogenic conversion has shown to enable biofilm formation in Bacillus anthracis. Strains of B. anthracis cured of all phage were unable to form biofilms, which are surface-adhered bacterial communities that enable bacteria to better access nutrients and survive environmental stresses. In addition to biofilm formation in B. anthracis, lysogenic conversion of Bacillus subtilis, Bacillus thuringiensis, and Bacillus cereus has shown an enhanced rate or extent of sporulation. Sporulation produces endospores, which are metabolically dormant forms of the bacteria that are highly resistant to temperature, ionizing radiation, desiccation, antibiotics, and disinfectants.

==== Bacterial virulence ====
Non-virulent bacteria have also been shown to transform into highly virulent pathogens through lysogenic conversion with the virulence factors carried on the lysogenic prophage. Virulence genes carried within prophages as discrete autonomous genetic elements, known as morons, confer an advantage to the bacteria that indirectly benefits the virus through enhanced lysogen survival.

Examples:

- Corynebacterium diphtheriae produces the toxin of diphtheria only when it is infected by the phage β. In this case, the gene that codes for the toxin is carried by the phage, not the bacterium.
- Vibrio cholerae is a non-toxic strain that can become toxic, producing cholera toxin, when it is infected with the phage CTXφ.
- Shigella dysenteriae, which produces dysentery has toxins that fall into two major groups, Stx1 and Stx2, whose genes are considered to be part of the genome of lambdoid prophages.
- Streptococcus pyogenes, produce a pyrogenic exotoxin, obtained by lysogenic conversion, which causes fever and a scarlet-red rash, scarlet fever.
- Certain strains of Clostridium botulinum, which causes botulism, express botulinum toxin from phage-tranduced genes.

==== Preventing lysogenic induction ====
Strategies to combat certain bacterial infections by blocking prophage induction (the transition from the lytic cycle to the lysogenic cycle) by eliminating in vivo induction agents have been proposed. Reactive oxygen species (ROS), such as hydrogen peroxide, are strong oxidizing agents that can decompose into free radicals and cause DNA damage to bacteria, which lead to prophage induction. One potential strategy to combat prophage induction is through the use of glutathione, a strong antioxidant that can remove free radical intermediates. Another approach could be to cause overexpression of CI repressor since prophage induction only occurs when the concentration of CI repressor is too low.
