= Ślopek =

Ślopek may refer to:

- Edward Slopek (born 1953), Canadian artist and professor of new media of Polish descent
- Józef Juraszek Ślopek (1824–1907), Polish pioneer in setting bones
- Stefan Ślopek (1914–1995), Polish microbiologist and immunologist
