= Phage monographs =

Bacteriophage (phage) are viruses of bacteria and arguably are the most numerous "organisms" on Earth. The history of phage study is captured, in part, in the books published on the topic. This is a list of over 100 monographs on or related to phages.

== List of phage monographs (descending date order) ==
=== Books published in the 2010s ===
1. Hyman, P., Abedon, S. T. 2018. Viruses of Microorganisms. ISBN 978-1-910190-86-9
2. Abedon, S. T., García, P., Mullany, P., Aminov, R. 2017. Phage therapy: past, present and future. ISBN 978-2-88945-251-4
3. Jassim, S.A.A., Limoges, R.G. 2017. Bacteriophages: Practical Applications for Nature's Biocontrol. ISBN 978-3-319-54050-4
4. Dobretsov, N. T., 2018. Bacteriophages: The Enemies of Our Enemies as published as a special issue in Science First Hand consisting of nine articles.
5. Rakonjac, J., Das, B. Derda, R. 2017. Filamentous Bacteriophage in Bio/Nano/Technology, Bacterial Pathogenesis and Ecology. ISBN 9782889450954
6. Nicastro, J., Wong, S., Khazaei, Z., Lam, P., Blay, J., Slavcev, R.A. 2016. Bacteriophage Applications - Historical Perspective and Future Potential. ISBN 978-3-319-45791-8
7. Allen, H. K., Abedon, S. T. 2015. Viral Ecology and Disturbances: Impact of Environmental Disruption on the Viruses of Microorganisms. ISBN 978-2-88919-448-3
8. Wei, H. 2015. Phages and Therapy as published as a special issue in Virologica Sinica consisting of four reviews, three research articles, six letters, and one insight article.
9. Weitz, J.S., 2015. Quantitative Viral Ecology: Dynamics of Viruses and Their Microbial Hosts. Princeton University Press, Princeton, NJ. ISBN 978-1-40087-396-8.
10. Borysowski, J., Międzybrodzki, R., Górski, A., eds. 2014. Phage Therapy: Current Research and Applications. Caister Academic Press, Norfolk, UK. ISBN 978-1-90823-040-9
11. Hyman, P., Harrah, T. 2014. Bacteriophage Tail Fibers as a Basis for Structured Assemblies. Momentum Press/ASME, New York, NY. ISBN 978-0-79186-037-3
12. Chanishvili, N. 2012. A Literature Review of the Practical Application of Bacteriophage Research. Nova Science Publishers, Hauppauge, New York. ISBN 978-1-62100-851-4
13. Hyman, P., Abedon, S. T., eds. 2012. Bacteriophages in Health and Disease CABI Press, Wallingford, Oxfordshire, UK. ISBN 978-1-84593-984-7
14. Abedon, S. T. 2011. Bacteriophages and Biofilms: Ecology, Phage Therapy, Plaques. Nova Science Publishers, Hauppauge, New York. Partial online version is also available, constituting effectively a "first edition". ISBN 978-1-61761-588-7
15. Petrenko, V., Smith, G., eds. 2011. Phage Nanobiotechnology. RSC Publishing, Cambridge, UK. Scheduled for a June, 2011, publication. ISBN 978-0-8540-4184-8
16. Abedon, S. T., ed. 2010. The 'Nuts and Bolts' of Phage Therapy. a special issue of the journal, Current Pharmaceutical Biotechnology, consisting of six articles on phage therapy, plus an editorial.
17. Carnazza, S., Guglielmino, S. eds. 2010. Phage Display As a Tool for Synthetic Biology. Nova Science Publishers, Hauppauge, New York. ISBN 978-1-60876-987-2
18. Sabour, P. M., Griffiths, M. W., eds. 2010. Bacteriophages in the Control of Food- and Waterborne Pathogens. ASM Press, Washington, D.C. ISBN 978-1-55581-502-8

=== Books published in the 2000s ===
1. Adams, H. T., 2009. Contemporary Trends in Bacteriophage Research. Nova Science Publishers, Hauppauge, New York. ISBN 978-1-60692-181-4
2. Chanishvili, N., Sharp, R. 2009. A Literature Review of the Practical Application of Bacteriophage Research. Copyright: Eliava Institute of Bacteriophage, Microbiology and Virology, Tbilisi, Georgia.
3. Clokie M. R. J., Kropinski, A. M., eds. 2009. Bacteriophages: Methods and Protocols.Volume 1: Isolation, Characterization, and Interactions. Humana Press, Totowa, NJ. This monographs is described also as Methods in Molecular Biology, volume 501. ISBN 978-1-61737-715-0
4. Clokie M. R. J., Kropinski, A. M., eds. 2009. Bacteriophages: Methods and Protocols.Volume 2: Molecular and Applied Aspects. Humana Press, Totowa, NJ. This monographs is described also as Methods in Molecular Biology, volume 502. ISBN 978-1-60327-565-1
5. Abedon, S. T., ed. 2008. Bacteriophage Ecology: Population Growth, Evolution, and Impact of Bacterial Viruses. Cambridge University Press, Cambridge, UK. This monograph is described also as Advances in Molecular and Cellular Microbiology, volume 15. ISBN 0-521-85845-3
6. Mc Grath, S. and van Sinderen, D., eds. 2007. Bacteriophage: Genetics and Molecular Biology. Caister Academic Press, Norfolk, UK. ISBN 1-904455-14-X
7. Cairns, J., G. Stent, and J. D. Watson, eds. 2007. Phage and the Origins of Molecular Biology (40th anniversary edition). Cold Spring Harbor Laboratory Press, Cold Spring Harbor, NY. ISBN 0-87969-800-4
8. Holmes, F. L., and W. C. Summers. 2006. Reconceiving the Gene: Seymour Benzer's Adventures in Phage Genetics. Yale University Press, New Haven, CT. OCLC 62342731, ISBN 0-300-11078-2
9. Wegrzyn, G., ed. 2006. Modern Bacteriophage Biology and Biotechnology. Research Signpost 37/661 (2), Fort PO, Trivandrum-695023, Kerala, India. ISBN 81-308-0033-0
10. Calendar, R., and S. T. Abedon, eds. 2006. The Bacteriophages. 2nd edition. Oxford University Press, Oxford. OCLC 65192869, ISBN 0-19-514850-9
11. Häusler, T. 2006. Viruses vs. Superbugs: A Solution to the Antibiotic Crisis. Macmillan, London. OCLC 62804701, ISBN 1-4039-8764-5
12. Birge, E. A. 2006. Bacterial and Bacteriophage Genetics. Springer-Verlag, New York. OCLC 17838673, ISBN 0-387-23919-7
13. Catalano, C. E., ed. 2005. Viral Genome Packaging Machines: Genetics, Structure, and Mechanism. Landes Bioscience/Eurekah, Georgetown, TX; Kluwer Academic/Plenum Publishers, New York. OCLC 57731385, ISBN 0-306-48227-4
14. Kutter, E., and A. Sulakvelidze, eds. 2005. Bacteriophages: Biology and Application. CRC Press, Boca Raton, FL. OCLC 56880238, ISBN 0-8493-1336-8
15. Sidhu, S. S. 2005. Phage Display In Biotechnology and Drug Discovery. CRC Press, OCLC 60311940, ISBN 0-8247-5466-2
16. Waldor, M. K., D. Friedman, and S. Adhya, eds. 2005. Phages: Their Role in Bacterial Pathogenesis and Biotechnology. ASM Press, Washington, DC. OCLC 57557385, ISBN 1-55581-307-0
17. Clackson, T., and H. B. Lowman. 2004. Phage Display: A Practical Approach. Oxford University Press, Oxford. OCLC 54904081, ISBN 0-19-963874-8
18. Ptashne, M. 2004. Genetic Switch: Phage Lambda Revisited. Cold Spring Harbor, New York, Cold Spring Harbor Laboratory Press. OCLC 54035585, ISBN 0-87969-716-4
19. Häusler, T. 2003. Gesund durch Viren — Ein Ausweg aus der Antibiotika-Krise. Piper, München, Germany. [German; Healthy through Viruses - A Way Out of the Antibiotic-Resistance Crisis] OCLC 53098607
20. O'Brien, P. M., and R. Aitken. 2002. Antibody Phage Display: Methods and Protocols. Humana Press, Totawa, NJ. OCLC 50175105, ISBN 0-89603-906-4
21. Peyrieras, N., and M. Morange. 2002. Travaux scientifiques de François Jacob. Odile Jacob, Paris. [French; The scientific works of François Jacob] OCLC 49567654
22. Burton, D. R., J. K. Scott, G. J. Silverman, and C. F. Barbas. 2001. Phage Display: A Laboratory Manual. Cold Spring Harbor Laboratory Press, Cold Spring Harbor, NY. OCLC 43903550, ISBN 0-87969-740-7
23. Birge, E. A. 2000. Bacterial and Bacteriophage Genetics. Springer-Verlag, New York. OCLC 41273243, ISBN 0-387-23919-7
24. Stahl, F. W. 2000. We Can Sleep Later: Alfred D. Hershey and the Origins of Molecular Biology. Cold Spring Harbor Laboratory Press, Cold Spring Harbor, NY. OCLC 43185885, ISBN 0-87969-567-6

The following have not yet been sufficiently scrutinized to ascertain that they technically are books (e.g., are not theses), are generally available, or are sufficiently about phages to be included in the above list:

- Rasool, S. A. 2002. Bacterial Viruses: Basic and Applied Concepts. University Grants Commission, Islamabad. OCLC 62340547
- Jia, P. X. 2001. Molecular Biology of Bacteriophage. Science Press, Beijing. OCLC ???
- Kutter, E. 2001. Phage Therapy: Bacteriophage as Natural, Self-limiting Antibiotics. AstraZeneca Research Foundation India, India. OCLC ???, ISBN 81-901238-3-1

=== Books published in the 1990s ===
1. Summers, W. C. 1999. Felix d'Herelle and the Origins of Molecular Biology. Yale University Press, New Haven, CT. OCLC 47011823, ISBN 0-300-07127-2
2. Kay, B. K., J. Winter, and J. McCafferty. 1996. Phage Display of Peptides and Proteins: A Laboratory Manual. Academic Press, San Diego, CA. OCLC 34409484, ISBN 0-12-402380-0
3. Rothman-Denes, L., and R. Weisberg. 1995. Recent developments in bacteriophage virology. Academic Press, London. OCLC 34099713
4. Birge, E. A. 1994. Bacterial and Bacteriophage Genetics. Springer-Verlag, New York. OCLC 29791890, ISBN 3-540-94270-X
5. Jacob, F. 1995. The Statue Within: An Autobiography. Cold Spring Harbor Laboratory Press, Cold Spring Harbor, New York. OCLC 17353378, ISBN 0-87969-476-9
6. Karam, J. D. et al. 1994. Molecular Biology of Bacteriophage T4. ASM Press, Washington, DC. OCLC 30028892, ISBN 1-55581-064-0
7. Twort, A. 1993. In Focus, Out of Step: A Biography of Frederick William Twort F.R.S. 1877-1950. Sutton Publishing, Thrupp, Stroud; Phoenix Mill, Gloucestershire, UK. OCLC 28025779, ISBN 0-7509-0327-9
8. Klaus, S., W. Krüger, and J. Meyer. 1992. Bakterienviren. Gustav Fischer, Stuttgart. [German; Bacterial Viruses] OCLC 26765458
9. Ptashne, M. 1992. A Genetic Switch: Phage Lambda and Higher Organisms. Blackwell, Cambridge, MA. OCLC 25713934, ISBN 0-86542-209-5
10. Cairns, J., G. Stent, and J. D. Watson. 1992. Phage and the Origins of Molecular Biology (expanded edition). Cold Spring Harbor Laboratory Press, Cold Spring Harbor, NY. OCLC 25872929
11. He, N.-B., Z.-T. Si, and M.-X. Yu. 1991. Bacteriophage Images [Chinese]. Science Press, Beijing.

The following have not yet been sufficiently scrutinized to ascertain that they technically are books (e.g., are not theses), are generally available, or are sufficiently about phages to be included in the above list:

- Anonymous. 1991. Practical Phage Control. International Dairy Federation, Brussels.
- van Helvoort, T. 1993. Research Styles in Virus Studies in the Twentieth Century: Controversies and the Formation of Consensus. Doctoral Thesis, University of Limburg. (note that though this is a thesis, it is of sufficient general interest toward addressing issues in the history of bacteriophagy as to warrant inclusion in this list)

=== Books published in the 1980s ===
1. Birge, E. A. 1988. Bacterial and Bacteriophage Genetics: An Introduction. Springer-Verlag, New York. OCLC 17838673, ISBN 0-387-96696-X
2. Hobom, G., and R. Rott, eds. 1988. The Molecular Biology of Bacterial Virus Systems. Current Topics in Microbiology and Immunology, Volume 136. Springer-Verlag, Berlin. OCLC 18590320, ISBN 0-387-18513-5
3. Jacob, F. 1988. The Statue Within: An Autobiography. Basic Books, New York. OCLC 17353378, ISBN 0-465-08222-X
4. Jacob, F. La Statue intérieure [French: The Statue Within]. Editions Odile Jacob, Paris
5. Fischer, E. P., and C. Lipson. 1988. Thinking About Science: Max Delbrück and the Origins of Molecular Biology. W.W. Norton & Co., New York. OCLC 16277429, ISBN 0-393-02508-X
6. Calendar, R. 1988. The Bacteriophages. Volume I Plenum Press, New York. OCLC 18686137
7. Calendar, R. 1988. The Bacteriophages. Volume II Plenum Press, New York. OCLC 17675040
8. Goyal, S. M., C. P. Gerba, and G. Bitton. 1987. Phage Ecology. CRC Press, Boca Raton, Florida. OCLC 15654933, ISBN 0-471-82419-4
9. Symonds, N., A. Toussaint, P. van de Putte, and W. V. Howe. 1987. Phage Mu. Cold Spring Harbor Press, Cold Spring Harbor, N.Y. OCLC 16089280, ISBN 0-87969-306-1
10. Ackermann, H.-W., and M. S. DuBow. 1987. Viruses of Prokaryotes, Volume 1, General Properties of Bacteriophages. CRC Press, Boca Raton, Florida. OCLC 15518646, ISBN 0-8493-6056-0
11. Ackermann, H.-W., and M. S. DuBow. 1987. Viruses of Prokaryotes, Volume 2, Natural Groups of Bacteriophages. CRC Press, Boca Raton, Florida. OCLC ???, ISBN 0-8493-6056-0
12. Ptashne, M. 1986. A Genetic Switch: Gene Control and Phage ?. Blackwell, Cambridge, MA. OCLC 14719427, ISBN 0-86542-315-6
13. Mendzhul, M. I. 1985. Tsianofagi: Virusy Tsianobakterii. Nauk. dumka, Kiev. [Russian; Cyanophages] OCLC 16131273
14. Luria, S. E. 1984. A Slot Machine, a Broken Test Tube: An Autobiography. Harper & Row, Publishers, New York. OCLC 9758798, ISBN 0-06-091213-8 (1985 paperback ISBN 0-465-07831-1)
15. Lin, E. C. C., R. Goldstein, and M. Syvanen. 1984. Bacteria, Plasmids, and Phages: An Introduction to Molecular Biology. Harvard University Press, Cambridge, MA . OCLC 10182998, ISBN 0-674-58166-0
16. Mathews, C. K., E. M. Kutter, G. Mosig, and P. B. Berget. 1983. Bacteriophage T4. American Society for Microbiology, Washington, DC. OCLC 9622410, ISBN 0-914826-56-5
17. Hendrix, R. W., J. W. Roberts, F. W. Stahl, and R. A. Weisberg. 1983. Lambda II. Cold Spring Harbor Laboratory, Cold Spring Harbor, New York. OCLC 9556019, ISBN 0-87969-150-6
18. Birge, E. A. 1981. Bacterial and Bacteriophage Genetics: An Introduction. Springer-Verlag, New York. OCLC 7248504, ASIN B000ICBYWI
19. DuBow, M. 1981. Bacteriophage Assembly: Proceedings of the Seventh Biennial Conference on Bacteriophage Assembly, Asilomar, California, September 14–17, 1980. A.R. Liss, New York. OCLC 7555738, ISBN 0-8451-0064-5
20. Randall, L. L., and L. Philipson. 1980. Virus Receptors part 1 Bacterial Viruses. Chapman and Hall, London and New York. OCLC 8409813

The following have not yet been sufficiently scrutinized to ascertain that they technically are books (e.g., are not theses), are generally available, or are sufficiently about phages to be included in the above list:

- Smith-Keary, P. F. 1988. Genetic Elements in Escherichia coli. MacMillan Education Ltd., London. OCLC ???, ISBN 0-333-44268-7
- Sorber, C. A., and S. W. Funderburg. 1983. Bacteriophages as Indicators of Human Enteric Viruses in Activated Sludge Wastewater Treatment. Univ of Texas at Austin Center. OCLC ???, ISBN 99930-60-64-X
- ??? 1983. Cloning with Bacteriophage. ???, ??? OCLC ???
- ??? 1982. Bakteriofagi: Sbornik Nauchnykh Trudov. ???, ??? [language; title in English] OCLC 18836533
- Desjardins, P. R., and G. B. Olson. 1983. Viral Control of Nuisance Cyanobacteria (Blue-Green Algae). II. Cyanophage Strains, Stability on Phages and Hosts, and Effects of Environmental Factors on Phage-Host Interactions. California Water Resource Center, University of California, Davis, CA. OCLC ???

=== Books published in the 1970s ===
1. Ratner, V. A., ed. 1979. Matematicheskie Modeli Molekuliyarno-Geneticheskikh Sistem Upravleniya. [Russian; Mathematical Models of Molecular Genetic Regulatory Systems]. Ed. Akad. Nauk SSSR, Novosibirsk, Sbornik Nauchnykh Trudov, Moscow. OCLC 7733759
2. Stahl, F. W. 1979. Genetic Recombination: Thinking About it in Phage and Fungi. W.H. Freeman, San Francisco. OCLC 4956846, ISBN 0-7167-1037-4
3. Pulverer, G., P. B. Heczko, and G. Peters. 1979. Phage-Typing of Coagulase-Negative Staphylococci: Proceedings of the 1st International Conference, Cologne, September 16–18, 1977. G. Fischer, Stuttgart. OCLC 5105577
4. Denhardt, D. T., D. Dressler, and D. S. Ray. 1978. The Single-Stranded DNA Phages. Cold Spring Harbor Laboratory, Cold Spring Harbor, NY. OCLC 4491528, ISBN 0-87969-122-0
5. Fraenkel-Conrat, H., and R. R. Wagner. 1977. Comprehensive Virology: Reproduction of Bacterial DNA Viruses. Plenum Press, New York. OCLC 2331482, ISBN 0-306-35147-1
6. Primrose, S. B. 1976. Bacterial Transduction. Meadowfield Press Ltd., Durham, England. OCLC 3857517, ISBN 0-904095-23-1
7. Winkler, U., W. Rüger, and W. Wackernagel. 1976. Bacterial, Phage and Molecular Genetics. An Experimental Course, 2nd ed. Springer, Berlin. OCLC 2121428, ISBN 0-387-07602-6
8. Douglas, J. 1975. Bacteriophages. p. 77-133. Chapman and Hall, London. OCLC 1176725
9. Zinder, N. D. 1975. RNA Phages. Cold Spring Harbor Laboratory, Cold Spring Harbor, NY. OCLC 1582488, ISBN 0-87969-109-3
10. Buczowski, Z., and H. Rische. 1974. Lysotypie und andere spezielle epidemiologische Laboratoriumsmethoden. [German & English; Phage Typing and Other Special Epidemiological Laboratory Methods]. Gustav-Fischer-Verlag, Jena, Germany. OCLC 14423391
11. Gasser, F. 1974. Microbiologie générale, Volume 1. Bactéries et Bactériophages. [French; Bacteria and Bacteriophages]. Ediscience, /McGraw-Hill, Paris OCLC ???
12. King, R. C. 1974. Handbook of Genetics: Bacteria, Bacteriophages, and Fungi. Plenum Press, New York. OCLC 914857, ISBN 0-306-37611-3
13. Krzywy, T., and S. Slopek. 1974. Morfologia i ultrastruktura bakteriofagów Shigella i Klebsiella. Polish Medical Publishers, Warsaw. [Polish; Morphology and Ultrastructure of Shigella and Klebsiella bacteriophages] OCLC 6943982
14. Champe, S. P. 1974. Phage. Dowden, Hutchinson & Ross, Stroudsburg, PA. OCLC 980240
15. Dalton, A. J., and F. Haguenau. 1973. Ultrastructure of Animal Viruses and Bacteriophages. An Atlas. Academic Press, New York. OCLC 762216, ASIN B0006C4EEA
16. Poglazov, B. F. 1973. Morphogenesis of T-Even Bacteriophages. Monographs in Developmental Biology, Volume 7, ed.-in-chief A. Wolsky. S. Karger, New York. OCLC ???, ISBN 3-8055-1645-2
17. Winkler, U., W. Rüger and W. Wackernagel. 1972. Bakterien-, Phagen- und Molekulargenetik. [German; Bacterial, Phage and Molecular Genetics]. Springer, Berlin
18. Mathews, C. K. 1971. Bacteriophage Biochemistry. Van Nostrand Reinhold Co., New York. OCLC 136326, ISBN 0-8412-0288-5
19. Hershey, A. D. 1971. The Bacteriophage Lambda. Cold Spring Harbor Laboratory, OCLC 220264
20. Snustad, D. P., and D. S. Dean. 1971. Genetics Experiments with Bacterial Viruses. W. H. Freeman and Co., San Francisco. OCLC 333991, ISBN 0-7167-0161-8
21. Tomizawa, J. -I., ed. 1971. Virulent Phage (Selected Papers in Biochemistry, Volume 1). University of Tokyo Press, Tokyo, and University Park Press, Baltimore, MD. OCLC 208390, ISBN 0-8391-0612-2
22. Tomizawa, J.-I., ed. 1971. Bacterial Genetics and Temperate Phage (Selected Papers in Biochemistry, Volume 2). University Park Press, Baltimore, MD. OCLC 200390, ISBN 0-8391-0611-4
23. Hayes, W. 1970. The Genetics of Bacteria and their Viruses: Studies in Basic Genetics and Molecular Biology. Wiley, New York. OCLC 4655740, ASIN B000H5C8WG
24. Juhasz, S. E., and G. Plummer. 1970. Host-Virus Relationships in Mycobacterium, Nocardia and Actinomyces. Charles C. Thomas, publisher, Springfield, Illinois. OCLC 113345, ISBN 978-0-398-00953-3
25. Gabrilovitch I. 1970. Lysogeniya [Russian;Lysogeny]. Izdadelstvo Belarus, Minsk, Belarus
26. Tikhonenko, A. S. 1970. Ultrastructure of Bacterial Viruses. Plenum Press, New York. OCLC 14492588, ISBN 0-306-30421-X

The following have not yet been sufficiently scrutinized to ascertain that they technically are books (e.g., are not theses), are generally available, or are sufficiently about phages to be included in the above list:

- Desjardins, P. R., M. B. Barkley, S. A. Swiecki, and S. N. West. 1978. Viral Control of blue-green algae. California Water Resource Center, University of California, OCLC ???
- ??? 1978. Bakteriofagi i Ikh Ispol'zovanie v Veterinarnoi Praktike. ???, ??? [Russian; Bacteriophages and Their Utilization in Veterinary Practice] OCLC 4111249
- ??? 1977. Gene Expression V. 3 Plasmids and Phages. ???, ??? OCLC 13187199
- ??? 1972. Saikin Faji Iden Jikkenho. ???, ??? [Japanese; Experimental Methods in Bacteriophage Genetics] OCLC 14420642

=== Books published in the 1960s ===
1. Gabrilovitch IM. 1968. Bakteriophage techniques [Russian]. Izdadelstvo Vychzyshaya Shkola, Minsk, Belarus
2. Hayes, W. 1968. The Genetics of Bacteria and their Viruses. Wiley, New York. OCLC 5628
3. Tikhonenko, A. S. 1968. Ultrastruktura Virusov Bakterii. [Russian; Ultrastructure of Bacterial Viruses]. Izdadelstvo "Nauka", Moscow. OCLC 14492588
4. Raettig, H. 1967. Bakteriophagie 1957-1965 (Bacteriophagy 1957-1965). G. Fischer, Stuttgart. [German and English] OCLC 14503598
5. Raiga, A. 1967. El Bacteriofago de d'Herelle. Universidad Nacional Autónoma de México. [Spanish translation of French "Le Bacteriophage de d'Herelle", Revue Philosophique de la France et l'Etranger, 4, octobre-diciembre, 1961.] 40 pages. OCLC: 6307317
6. Cairns, J., G. Stent, and J. D. Watson. 1966. Phage and the Origins of Molecular Biology. Cold Spring Harbor Laboratory Press, Cold Spring Harbor, NY. OCLC 712215
7. Stent, G. S. 1965. Molekulyarnaya Biologiya Virusov Bakterii. [Russian; Molecular Biology of Bacterial Viruses]. Izdadelstvo "MIR", Moscow. OCLC 55892813
8. Gani, J. 1965. Stochastic Models For Bacteriophage. Methuen & Co. Ltd., London. OCLC 279694
9. Hayes, W., 1964. The Genetics of Bacteria and their Viruses. Wiley, New York. OCLC 559954
10. Stent, G. S. 1963. Molecular Biology of Bacterial Viruses. WH Freeman and Co., San Francisco, CA. OCLC 268815
11. Geissler, E. 1962. Bakteriophagen, Objekte der Modernen Genetik. Akademie-Verlag, Berlin. [German; Bacteriophages, Objects of the Modern Genetics] OCLC 14607452
12. Pekhov, A. P. 1962. Elektronnomikroskopicheskoe issledovanie bakterii i fagov. ???, ??? [Russian; Electron Microscopic Study of Bacteria and Phage] OCLC 14607218
13. Adams, M. H. and A S Kriviskiĭ. 1961. Bakteriofagi. Russian. Moskva, Izd-vo inostrannoĭ lit-ry. OCLC: 18358144
14. Stent, G. S. 1960. Papers on Bacterial Viruses. Little, Brown and Co., Boston. OCLC 485853

=== Books published in the 1950s ===
1. Adams, M. H. 1959. Bacteriophages. Interscience, New York. OCLC 326505
2. Ho, N. B., Z. T. Si, and M. X. Yu. 1959. Bacteriophages from China. An Electron Microscopical Atlas. Science Press, Beijing. OCLC ???
3. Hercik, F. 1959. Biophysik der Bakteriophagen. VEB Deutscher Verlag der Wissenschaften, Berlin. [German; Biophysics of Bacteriophages] OCLC 15258981
4. Burnet, F. M., and W. M. Stanley. 1959. The Viruses: Biochemical, Biological and Biophysical Properties: Plant and Bacterial Viruses. Academic Press, New York. OCLC 326764
5. Raettig, H. 1958. Bakteriophagie, 1917 bis 1956; Zugleich en Vorschlag zur Dokumentation Wissenschaftlicher Literatur. G. Fischer, Stuttgart. [German; Bacteriophagy 1917 to 1956; At the Same Time a suggestion on the Documentation of Scientific Literature] OCLC 4309311
6. Terada, M. 1956. Studies on Bacterial Viruses. Naya Publishing Co., Tokyo. OCLC 1064505
7. Jacob, F. 1954. Les bactéries lysogènes et la notion de provirus. Masson, Paris. [French; The Lysogenic Bacteria and the Concept of the Provirus] OCLC 5780525
8. International Union of Biological Sciences. 1953. Le Bactériophage: Premier Colloque International. Institut Pasteur, Paris. [French; The Bacteriophage: First International Conference] OCLC 11662838
9. Evans, E. A. 1952. Biochemical Studies of Bacterial Viruses. University of Chicago Press, Chicago. OCLC 3195879
10. Hedén, C.-G. 1951. Studies of the infection of E. coli B with the bacteriophage T2. Acta. Path. Microbiol. Scand. supplement 8:1-126. OCLC 14670314
11. Lederberg, J. 1951. Papers in Microbial Genetics: Bacteria and Bacterial Viruses. University of Wisconsin Press, Madison. OCLC 2472829
12. Zhdanov, D. A., ed. 1950. Biologicheskie Antiseptiki: Bakteriofagi, Antitela, Antibiotiki. Russian. OCLC 14672517

The following have not yet been sufficiently scrutinized to ascertain that they technically are books (e.g., are not theses), are generally available, or are sufficiently about phages to be included in the above list:

- Sutin, I. A. 1958. Bakteriofagi i ikh primenenie v meditsinskoĭ praktike. Russian. OCLC 14614699
- Adams, M. H., J. H. jr. Comroe, and E. H. Venning. 1950. Methods of Study of Bacterial Viruses. Year Book Publishers, Chicago. OCLC 67599839

=== Books published in the 1940s ===
1. Hammarström, E. 1949. Phage-Typing of Shigella sonnei. Stockholm. OCLC 5140885
2. Lilleengen, K. 1948. Typing of Salmonella typhimurium by means of bacteriophage. The Bacteriological Hygienical Department of the Royal Veterinary College, Stockholm. OCLC 14665054
3. Steinmann, J. 1946. Le Bactériophage: Sa Nature et son Emploi Thérapeutique. K, Bâle. [French; The Bacteriophage: Its Nature and its Therapeutic Employment] OCLC 14735726
4. Flu, P. C. 1946. The Bacteriophage: A Historical and Critical Survey of 25 Years Research. Universitaire Pers Leiden, Leiden. OCLC 14744384
5. d'Hérelle, F., 1946. L’étude d’une maladie: Le Choléra. French. F. Rouge & Cie S. A., Lausanne.
6. Pokrovskaya, M. P., Kaganova, L. S., Morozenko, M. A., et al. 1941. Bacteriophage treatment of wounds. State publishing house of medical literature "Medgiz", Moscow. Russian.

The following have not yet been sufficiently scrutinized to ascertain that they technically are books (e.g., are not theses), are generally available, or are sufficiently about phages to be included in the above list:

- Durisić, M. 1948. Ultravirusi, rikecie i bakteriofagi. Croatian. Publisher: Beograd, Naucna knjiga. OCLC 14661068
- Zaeva, S. P. 1945. Anaerobnye Bakteriofagi. Russian. OCLC 14736765
- Raiga, A. 1941. Traitement des Plaies de Guerre par le Bactériophage de d'Hérelle . Legrand & Bertrand, Paris. [French; Treatment of the wounds of war by the bacteriophage of Hérelle] OCLC 14725592
- Tsulukidze, A.P. 1941. Experience of Use of Bacteriophages in the Conditions of War Traumatism. Russian? Gruzmedgiz, Tbilisi, Georgia.

=== Books published in the 1930s ===
1. Northrop, J. H. 1939. Crystalline Enzymes. The Chemistry of Pepsin, Trypsin, and Bacteriophage. Columbia University Press, New York. OCLC 2387455
2. d'Hérelle, F. 1938. Le Phénomène de la Guérison dans les Maladies Infectieuses. Masson et cie, Paris. [French; The Phenomenon of the Cure in the Infectious Diseases] OCLC 5784382
3. d'Herelle, F. translated by G. Eliava. 1934, Bakteriofag i fenomen vyzdorovlenija, Tbilisi State University Press, Tbilisi, Georgia [Russian translation of French text published in 1938, The Phenomenon of the Cure in Infectious Diseases]. OCLC 163085972.
4. d'Hérelle, F. 1933. Le Bactériophage et ses Applications Thérapeutiques. Doin, Paris. [French; The Bacteriophage and its Therapeutic Applications] OCLC 14749145
5. Gardner, A. D. 1931. Microbes and Ultramicrobes: An Account of Bacteria, Viruses and the Bacteriophage. Methuen & Co. Ltd., London. OCLC 3180401
6. d'Hérelle, F., and G. H. Smith. 1930. The Bacteriophage and its Clinical Application. p. 165-243. Charles C. Thomas, Publisher, Springfield, Illinois. OCLC 347451

The following have not yet been sufficiently scrutinized to ascertain that they technically are books (e.g., are not theses), are generally available, or are sufficiently about phages to be included in the above list:

- d'Hérelle, F. 1935. Bacteriophage and Phenomenon of Recovery. Russian. TSU Press, Tbilisi, Georgia

=== Books published in the 1920s ===
1. d'Hérelle, F. 1929. Études sur le Choléra. Impr. A. Serafini, Alexandrie. [French; Studies on Asiatic Cholera] OCLC 15864352
2. Schuurman, C. J. 1927. Der Bakteriophage, eine Ultramikrobe; das D'Herellesche Phänomen. Rohrmoser, Bonn. [German; The Bacteriophage, an Ultramicrobe: the D'Hérelle phenomenon] OCLC 14743783
3. d'Hérelle, F. 1926. Le Bactériophage et son Comportement. Masson et Cie, Paris. [French; The Bacteriophage and its Behavior] OCLC 11981307
4. d'Hérelle, F., and G. H. Smith. 1926. The Bacteriophage and Its Behavior. The Williams &Wilkins Co., Baltimore. OCLC 2394374
5. Hauduroy, P. 1925. Le Bactériophage de d'Hérelle. Librairie Le François, Paris. [French; The Bacteriophage of d'Hérelle] OCLC 17294190
6. d'Hérelle, F. 1924. Drie Voordrachten over het Verschijnsel der Bacteriophagie. J.B. Wolters, Groningen. [Dutch; Three presentations concerning the phenomenon of the bacteriophage] OCLC 17864544
7. d'Hérelle, F., and G. H. Smith. 1924. Immunity in Natural Infectious Disease. Williams & Wilkins Co., Baltimore. OCLC 586303
8. d'Hérelle, F. 1922. Der Bakteriophage und seine Bedeutung für die Immunität; nach einem erweiterten und verbesserten. F. Vieweg & Sohn, Braunschweig. [German; The Bacteriophage and its Meaning for Immunity: toward an extended and improved text of the author's translation] OCLC 36920828
9. d'Hérelle, F. 1922. The Bacteriophage: Its Role in Immunity. Williams and Wilkins Co./Waverly Press, Baltimore. OCLC 14789160, ASIN B000H6G02O, B000H6EK2G
10. d'Hérelle, F. 1921. Le Bactériophage: Son Rôle dans l'Immunité. Masson et cie, Paris. [French; The Bacteriophage: Its Role in Immunity] OCLC 14794182

The following have not yet been sufficiently scrutinized to ascertain that they technically are books (e.g., are not theses), are generally available, or are sufficiently about phages to be included in the above list:

- d'Hérelle, F., R. H. Malone, and M. N. Lahiri. 1930. Studies on Asiatic Cholera. Thacker, Spink & Co., Calcutta. OCLC 25936856
- d'Hérelle, F. 1923. Les Défenses de l'Organisme. Flammarion, Paris. [French; The Defenses of the Organism] OCLC 11127665
