= DMF =

DMF may refer to:

== Science and technology ==
=== Chemistry ===
- Dimethylformamide, a common solvent
- Dimethyl fumarate, a small molecule anti-inflammatory human medicine
- 2,5-Dimethylfuran, a liquid biofuel

=== Computing ===
- Distribution Media Format, the computer floppy disk format
- DivX Media Format, the media container format
- Death Master File, a document listing deaths in the US

=== Medicine ===
- Decay-missing-filled index for assessing dental caries prevalence as well as dental treatment needs among populations
- Drug Master File, a document in the pharmaceutical industry

=== Other technology ===
- Digital microfluidics, a fluid handling technique
- Dual-mass flywheel, a rotating mechanical device

== Other uses ==
- Danish Musicians' Union, a Danish trade union
- Defensive midfielder, in association football
