= GH1 =

GH1 can refer to:

- Glycoside hydrolase family 1, a family of enzymes
- Growth hormone 1, a human gene
- Pseudomonas virus gh1, a bacteriophage which infects some strains of Pseudomonas putida.
- Panasonic Lumix DMC-GH1, a digital hybrid still photography/video camera
- Guitar Hero (video game), the first game in the series
- Hill GH1, 1975 Formula One car
