= Edward Slopek =

Canadian artist and professor of new media

Edward Stanisław Slopek
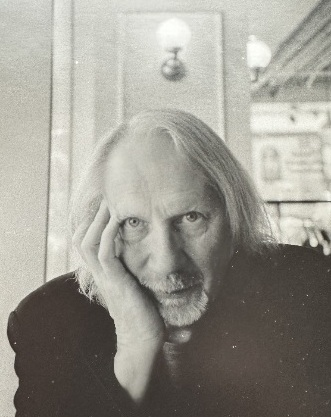
- Balzac Cafe, Ryerson University (2017)
- Born: 1 December 1953 (age 72); Manchester, England
- Citizenship: Canadian
- Occupations: Artist, professor
- Relatives: Stefan Ślopek (uncle); Józef Juraszek Ślopek (great, great grandfather)

Academic background
- Education: Montreal Museum of Fine Arts School of Art and Design; NSCAD University; University of Leicester (BA); McGill University (PhD)

Edward Stanisław Slopek (born December 1, 1953) is a Canadian artist and professor of new media.

== Early life ==
Slopek was born in Manchester, England. He was the first born child of Michalina (née Feret) and Czesław Ślopek. Both of his parents were born near Lviv, which at that time was part of Poland. Both of his parents’ families had migrated from areas near the Tatra Mountains in Southwest Poland following World War I when the Second Polish Republic was established. In 1940, Michalina (age 7) and Czesław (age 13) and their families were among some 325,000 Polish citizens that were deported by the Soviet Union to Siberian work camps. In 1942 both families were among some of 110,000 Poles that managed to leave the Soviet Union with Anders' Army. Czesław joined the army as a cadet and by the end of the war was part of the active Polish military and fought in the Italian campaign. Michalina and her family were sent to one refugee camp after another, the last of which was the Koja camp in Uganda. In 1947, as part of the Polish Resettlement Act 1947, both Czesław and Michalina were relocated to the United Kingdom where they met. In 1951, they were married in Stafford, England and then moved to Manchester where Edward was born in 1953. In 1958, the family emigrated to Montreal, Quebec, Canada. The family lived in the east end of Montreal until 1968 when they moved to St. Bruno, Quebec, a suburb of Montreal.

== Education ==
Edward received diplomas from the Montreal Museum of Fine Arts School of Art and Design and the Nova Scotia School of Art and Design (NSCAD). He received a Master of Arts from the University of Leicester and in 1995 a Doctor of Philosophy from McGill University. His thesis was entitled: Social emotion and communication: disciplinary, theoretical and etymological approaches to the postmodern everyday.

== Career ==
Edward has taught at NSCAD, McGill University, the University of Calgary, Brock University, and the School of Image Arts at Toronto Metropolitan University (formerly Ryerson University).

Ed taught at Ryerson for over 20 years in the fields of Communication Studies, Media and Fine Arts and was the Program Director for the New Media Option in the School of Image Arts located in The Image Centre. As an educator, Slopek was recognized for his engaging and unconventional teaching methods. Students praised his passion and ability to make complex subjects accessible. In 2007, his popularity led to the creation of several Facebook groups dedicated to him, with students expressing admiration for his teaching style and personality.

He was a founding member and Director of the Centre for Art Tapes in Halifax, Nova Scotia and also served as an Assistant Editor of the Canadian Journal of Communication.

== Works ==
Since the mid-70s, he has exhibited his video work and art installations globally. Notably, his works are part of the National Gallery of Canada's collection, including:

- Don't Look at this Videotape (1983): A 20-minute black-and-white silent videotape
- Nightmare (Three Essays for Edward O. Wilson) (1978): A series of black-and-white videotapes exploring themes of evolution and revolution

The Second Link: Viewpoints on Video in the Eighties (1983): Slopek's work was featured in this exhibition at the Montreal Museum of Modern Art (MoMA), which showcased various perspectives on video art during that era.

ReEXPOsitioning the Screen: The Past of the Future at Montreal’s World’s Fair, in Louise Poissand and Pierre Tremblay (eds), Prolifération des écrans / Proliferation of screens (2011)

Grand Tours: Gifts, Cybernauts, First Life - Travelling with Likes of Charges Babbage, Raymond Roussel, and Vachel Lindsey in Louise Poissand and Pierre Tremblay (eds), Ensemble ailleurs - Together Elsewhere (2011)

Bodies of Art: the Shaping of Aesthetic Experience

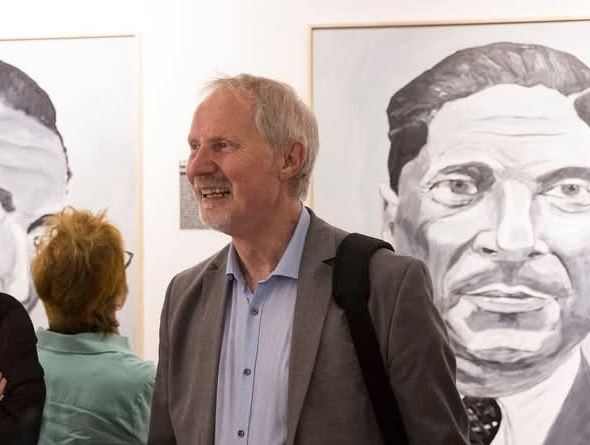
Parkinson's Exhibit (2019) at Images Arts at the Creative School

In 2012, Edward was diagnosed with Parkinson’s disease. In 2019 he underwent surgery for deep brain stimulation (DBS), which is a surgical procedure that implants a neurostimulator and electrodes which sends electrical impulses to specified targets in the brain responsible for movement control. Following the surgery Edward put together an exhibition that chronicled the surgery and he drew large scale portraits of notable people (Salvador Dalí, Pope Jean Paul II, and others) who were also afflicted with Parkinson's.

=== Public engagements ===
In addition to his academic and artistic pursuits, Slopek has been involved in public performances and events. For instance, in 2003, he served as the artistic director for It Was 35 Years Ago Today…, a performance commemorating the collaboration between Marcel Duchamp and John Cage.

== Bibliography ==
=== Books ===
- Slopek, Edward (2021). Bodies of Art: the Shaping of Aesthetic Experience. Quodlibet. ISBN 978-88-229-0715-8.

=== Other ===
- COUNTERBLAST: The Rogue McLuhan: Reblast, E.Slopek (ca) and E.Brondie (ca)
- Embodiments of mind 2 (1980)
