= ACG Group =

Indian Based Pharmaceutical Firm

- Industry: pharmaceutical machinery company
- Founded: 1961
- Founder: Ajit Singh, Jasjit Singh
- Headquarters: Mumbai, India
- Number of locations: 138
- Area served: Worldwide
- Number of employees: 4,500
- Website: www.acg-world.com

ACG is a multinational pharmaceutical machinery company with headquarters in Mumbai, India.The company operates in 100 countries across six continents.

The company produces pharmaceutical and packaging equipment, including empty hard capsules, encapsulation and tablet processing systems, fluid bed equipment, and packaging machinery such as blister packers, cartoners, and end-of-line solutions. The company also provides inspection and analytical systems.

== History ==
ACG was founded in 1961 by brothers Ajit Singh and Jasjit Singh to manufacture empty hard capsules for Indian pharmaceutical companies. Subsequently, the company expanded to other countries and diversified into related businesses in the pharmaceutical sector. These include equipment manufacturing, packaging, inspection, testing, research and development.

In 1971, SciTech Centre was incorporated in Mumbai as the R&D center of ACG. The Centre trains around 2,000 pharma professionals every year and also hosts scientific conferences.

In 2007, ACG acquired the capsule shell manufacturing plant of Lukaps in Croatia, making it the first Indian company from the pharmaceutical sector to establish a presence in Croatia. After successfully turning around the plant's operations, ACG announced further expansion plans worth 50 million Euros.

In 2014, ACG Europe was listed among the top 41 fast-growing Indian companies in UK.

In 2017, Nova Nordeplast, a Brazilian company that produces films and foils was acquired by ACG.

In 2017, ACG acquired In2trace, a Croatia-based startup with a proprietary technology in track-and-trace business. 90% of production of ACG’s plant in Croatia is exported to the USA, Russia and European countries.

== ACG business units ==
The ACG Group consists of four business units: ACG Capsules, ACG Films & Foils, ACG Engineering, and ACG Inspection.

=== ACG Capsules ===
ACG Capsules is a manufacturing company in the global capsules market providing two-piece hard gelatin capsules to pharmaceutical and nutraceutical industries in over 100 countries. The company operates capsule manufacturing facilities in India, Europe, and Brazil.

In 2018, ACG group signed a MoU with Applied DNA Sciences to develop molecularly tagged empty hard-shell capsules for prevention of capsule counterfeiting.

=== ACG Films & Foils ===
The ACG Films & Foils business provides specialty packaging films, high-barrier films, pharmaceutical-grade and camera-inspected range of aluminium-based foils and anti-counterfeiting and polymer films. The products of ACG Films & Foils comply with international standards such as US FDA, Canada-DMF, ISO and European Pharmacopoeia.

=== ACG Engineering ===
ACG Engineering provides Machines for the oral Solid dosage part of the pharma industry, right from granulation equipment, capsule filling machines, tablet press, tablet coaters, tablet tooling, and packaging machines like blister packing and Cartoning machines. ACG has completed more than 20,000 machine installations.

=== ACG Inspection ===
ACG Inspection (ACGI) provides solutions for the track-and-trace industry. In 2018, ACG Inspection partnered with Verinetics to integrate ACGI’s track-and-trace technology with TraxSecur, a software designed to detect fraud in the supply chain using serialization and blockchain systems.
