= Benny Chan =

Benny Chan may refer to:

- Benny Chan (actor) (born 1969), Hong Kong actor and singer
- Benny Chan (filmmaker) (1961–2020), Hong Kong film director, producer and writer

== See also ==
- Ben Chan (born 1975), Hong Kong politician
- Benjamin Chan, American biologist
