= Rati Golijashvili =

Georgian entrepreneur

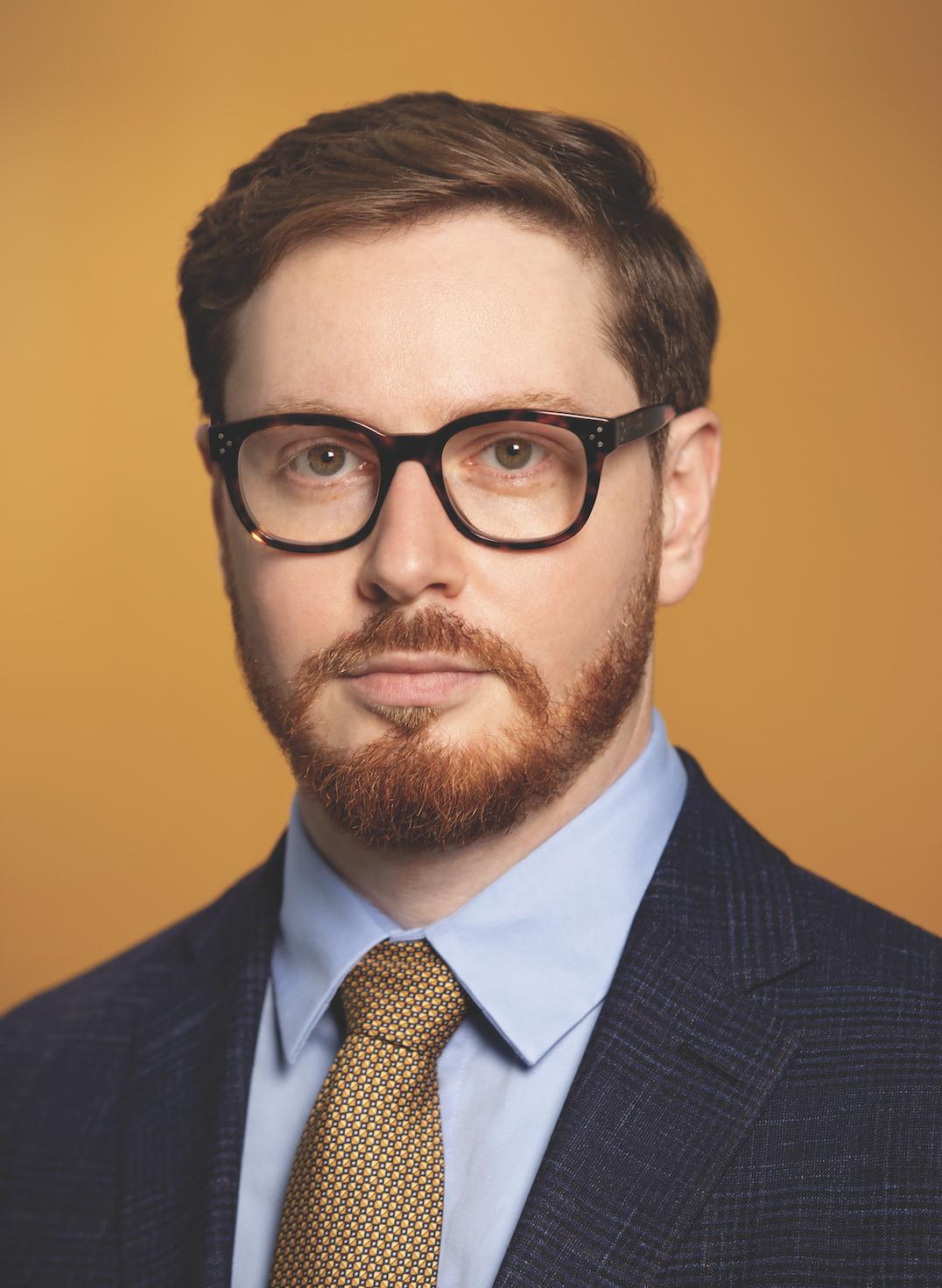
- Born: July 3, 1990 (age 34); Tbilisi, Georgia
- Occupation: Healthcare entrepreneur

Rati Golijashvili (July 3, 1990, Tbilisi, Georgia) is a Georgian healthcare entrepreneur and an advocate in the global fight against antimicrobial resistance (AMR).

== Biography ==
Born and raised in Tbilisi, Georgia, in a family of microbiologists and pharmacists, Golijashvili's passion for biotechnology and healthcare was deeply influenced by his upbringing. He holds a Master of Public Health.

Golijashvili is the CEO of BioChimPharm, a biopharmaceutical company based in Georgia, known for its groundbreaking work in phage therapy. Under his leadership, BioChimPharm has developed a phage technology platform that effectively substitutes traditional antibiotics, offering a sustainable solution to antibiotic-resistant infections.

Golijashvili's efforts in bringing life-saving medications to patients suffering from antibiotic-resistant infections globally and achievements in this area have earned the company numerous international awards, including recognitions from Forbes, Horizon Europe, the European Commission, The World Bank, the European Bank for Reconstruction and Development (EBRD), and the Food and Agriculture Organization (FAO).

In 2022, Golijashvili led the development of the first in its category, a robotized, high-tech, sterile manufacturing facility aimed at increasing the production capacity of life-saving novel antibiotics. This facility has enabled BioChimPharm to produce tens of millions of vials (Phage preparations) annually, helping to address the growing crisis of antibiotic resistance and improve preparedness for future pandemics.

Apart from his role at BioChimPharm, Golijashvili is the chairman of the Georgian Biopharmaceutical Cluster and a board member of the Georgian Pharmaceutical Association. He also serves on the advisory board of the Education and Science Committee in the Parliament of Georgia, where he contributes to policy development and innovation in education.

Golijashvili has participated in numerous public speaking engagements, including a TEDx talk in 2019, where he highlighted the critical need for large-scale adoption of phage therapy. He has also addressed international forums, such as the United Nations' annual meeting in 2022, emphasizing the urgency of combating AMR through innovative solutions.

Golijashvili has been recognized twice on the Forbes 30 Under 30 list under30.ge, first in Science (2018) and later in Manufacturing & Industry (2019). He is also a jury member for the Forbes 30 Under 30 list, where he continues to support young scientists in their respective fields.

Golijashvili is the author of two international patents related to phage technology and its application in treating antibiotic-resistant infections.
