= Richard Bruynoghe =

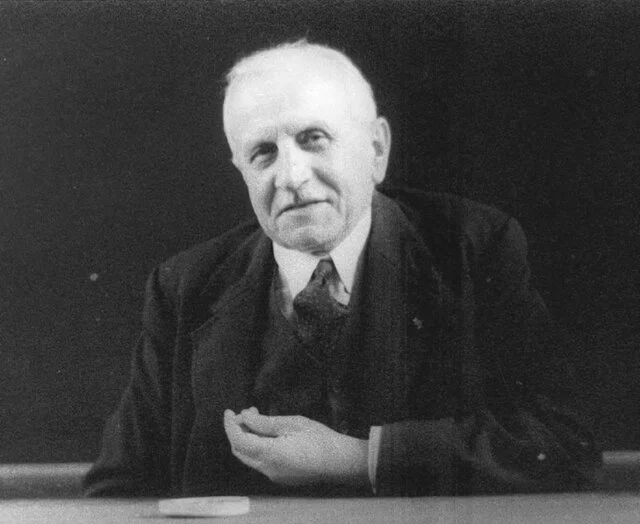
Bruynoghe, c. 1945

Richard Bruynoghe (4 November 1881 – 26 March 1957) was a Belgian physician and bacteriologist who conducted pioneering studies on the bacteriophages. He was among the first to make use of bacteriophages for human therapy (phage therapy), treating a man for Staphylococcus aureus infection.

Bruynoghe was born in Alveringem and received a medical degree in 1907 from the Universite Catholique de Louvain. He spent some time in France and Germany before he became a full professor at his alma mater where he founded and headed the Bacteriological Institute. He was able to show that there was a great deal of bacteriophage diversity. He conducted numerous experiments along with his student Joséph Maisin. He examined Salmonella typhi on different strains of bacteriophage and found that the Salmonella could become resistant to some strains but not others. He also noted that the human immune system recognized these strains based on experiments conducted with serum extracts and that looked at the immune response to different isolates. In 1921 he and his student Maisin reported a successful therapeutic application of bacteriophages in patients having Staphylococcus aureus infected wounds. During World War II, he served as the mayor of Leuven city.
