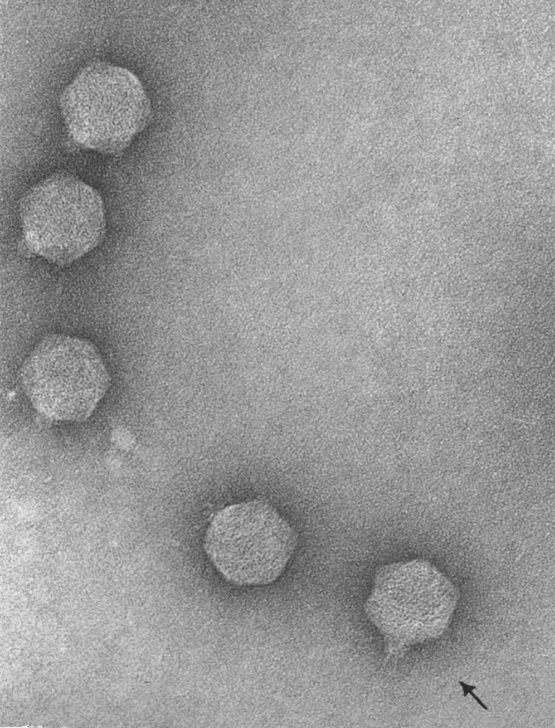
- Electron micrograph of bacteriophage gh-1 negatively stained with uranyl acetate. Magnification X 300,000. Two fibers attached to the wedge-shaped tail are visible on the bacteriophage, as indicated by an arrow.

Virus classification
- Missing taxonomy template (fix): Ghunavirus
- Species: Ghunavirus gh1

= Pseudomonas virus gh1 =

Bacteriophage gh-1

Species of virus

Bacteriophage gh-1 is a bacteriophage capable of infecting susceptible strains of Pseudomonas putida. It is a member of the genus Ghunavirus, family Autotranscriptaviridae, order Autographivirales. It was first isolated in 1966 from a sample taken from the aeration tank at a sewage plant in East Lansing, Michigan.

Sedimentation analysis indicates that gh-1 carries its genetic payload in the form of a 37,359 bp linear strand of dsDNA, inside an icosahedronal capsid 50 nm in diameter.

One-step growth experiments indicate that the latent period is approximately 21 min, with a burst size of 103.

It has been shown that this phage group requires an intact O-antigen on its host's outer membrane in order to successfully replicate and it is thus likely that lipopolysaccharide acts as the phage receptor.
