= Stefan Ślopek =

Polish Scientist

- Born: 1 December 1914; Skawa, Austria-Hungary
- Died: 22 August 1995 (aged 80); Wrocław, Poland

Stefan Ślopek (1 December 1914 in Skawa near Kraków – 22 August 1995, Wrocław was a Polish scientist specializing in clinical microbiology and immunology.

He is the great-grandson of Józef Juraszek Ślopek.

He is buried in the Grabiszyński Cemetery in Wrocław.

== Education ==
After he had completed his secondary education in Tarnopol, he started his medical studies at the Faculty of Medicine in Jan Kazimierz University in Lviv, having graduated in May 1939. In 1945, upon presentation of the thesis "O modyfikacji lwowskiej metody serologicznego badania kiły" (On Modification of the Lviv Method of Serologic Examination of Syphilis), he was granted a degree of M.D. at the Faculty of Medicine of the Jagiellonian University in Kraków.

== Career ==
In 1948, he was promoted to the rank of associate professor (docent) on the basis of a dissertation within the subject of microbiology and serology.

In 1950 he was conferred a title of professor at the Department of Microbiology of the Silesian School of Medicine where he carried on his scientific research and in 1957 got a title of full professor.

In 1965 Stefan Ślopek was elected a corresponding member of the Polish Academy of Sciences (PAN) and in 1973 as its full member.

Stefan Ślopek was an outstanding specialist in the field of clinical microbiology and immunology. Motivated by his great interest in the above-mentioned subjects, as early as before the Second World War, he started working for a branch of the State Department of Hygiene in Lviv and at the same time, under a scientific guidance of Prof. N. Gasiorowski, at the Department of Clinical Microbiology of Jan Kazimierz University in Lviv.

During World War II (1941–1945), he worked at the Institute for Research on Thyphus in Lviv with Rudolf Weigel as the head and then at its Kraków branch. At that time he was involved in production of sera, vaccines and diagnostic kits. Immediately after the war, from 1946 to 1949, he worked at the Faculty of Bacteriology of the Jagiellonian University and the Laboratory for Production of Sera and Vaccines of the State Department of Hygiene in Kraków.

From 1949 to 1954 he was employed at the Silesian School of Medicine as the head of the Faculty and Department of Clinical Microbiology, also fulfilling the duties of the dean of the Medical Department of the Silesian School of Medicine and from 1953 to October 1954 the rector's duties of the above school.

From 1954 to 1973 Stefan Ślopek held the position of the head of the Faculty and Department of Clinical Microbiology of the Wrocław School of Medicine and beginning in September 1954, up to the moment of his retirement in December 1985, the director of the Ludwik Hirszfeld Institute of Immunology and Experimental Therapy of the Polish Academy of Sciences in Wrocław.

As a result of his long term efforts the new premises at 12 Czerska street were built and since 1975 have been the location of the Ludwik Hirszfeld Institute of Immunology and Experimental Therapy. The institute is known as the centre of research in the field of immunology and experimental therapy in Poland, and owing to its wide cooperation with many foreign laboratories, it renders great service to the exploration of immunological phenomena and immunological differentiation of living organisms.

Stefan Ślopek is the author of over 300 original scientific papers, above 30 reviewed and popularized scientific publications, 7 manuals, 7 monographs among them Immunology, Practical Immunology, Medical Microbiology (published: 1955, 1958, 1965, 1966, 1972), Clinical Microbiology, Dictionary of Immunology (published: 1980, 1983). He is also a coauthor of numerous chapters in books published in Poland and other countries.

== Phage therapy ==
The most detailed publications documenting phage therapy have come from Stefan Ślopek's group at the Institute of Immunology and Experimental Medicine of the Polish Academy of Sciences in Wroclaw.

Ślopek wrote six papers on phagotherapy in which he discussed the efficiency of bacteriophages against bacterial infections including those caused by multi-resistance mutants. In one paper, Ślopek describes the effect phages had on his patients suffering from sepsis caused by bacterial infections. From 1981 to 1986, five hundred and fifty cases were treated, all aged from 1 to 86. The treatment began with antibiotics; however, they turned out to be inefficient for five hundred and eighteen patients. Therapy began by isolating the phages to form the etiologic agents which were then administered to the patients. The treatment could be taken either orally (phages were given three times a day before eating after the patient had received the necessities to neutralise gastric acids) or locally (application on wounds or cavities of a moist containing phages). Additionally drops of the etiologic serum could be dropped on the eyes. In case the bacteria became resistant the phages were replaced by newly selected phages.

All in all, the phage therapy appears to be favorable as positive results were obtained in 508 cases (equivalent to 92.4%) and improvements were observed in 38 cases (6.9%). However, the treatment was ineffective in 4 cases (0.7%). In total, the treatment was effective for 94.2% of the patients (taking only into accounts the 518 resistant cases). On the other hand, the experience had no "control" group (infected patients who were not treated with phage therapy), making the percentages obtained less indicative.

== Awards and recognitions ==
As a distinguished immunologist and microbiologist he held a number of responsible positions in the scientific life of Poland. From 1956 to 1987 he was editor-in-chief of Archivum Immunologiae et Therapiae Experimentalis; from 1962 to 1990 the head and president of the Coordination Committee of the interdisciplinary program “Studies and application of immunologic differentiation of organisms” member of the Presidium of its Wrocław branch; president of the Committee of Immunology; a founding member and the president of the Polish Association of Immunologist (and also its honorary member); a member of the International Union of Oncology and a member of numerous scientific societies; a member of the Presidium and the president of the Medical Sciences of the Central Qualifying Board, the vice-president of the Board, and an honorary member of the Polish Microbiological Society.

In 1981, Ślopek became a founding member of the World Cultural Council.
