= Phage therapy =

Therapeutic use of bacteriophages to treat bacterial infections

Phage injecting its genome into bacterial cell

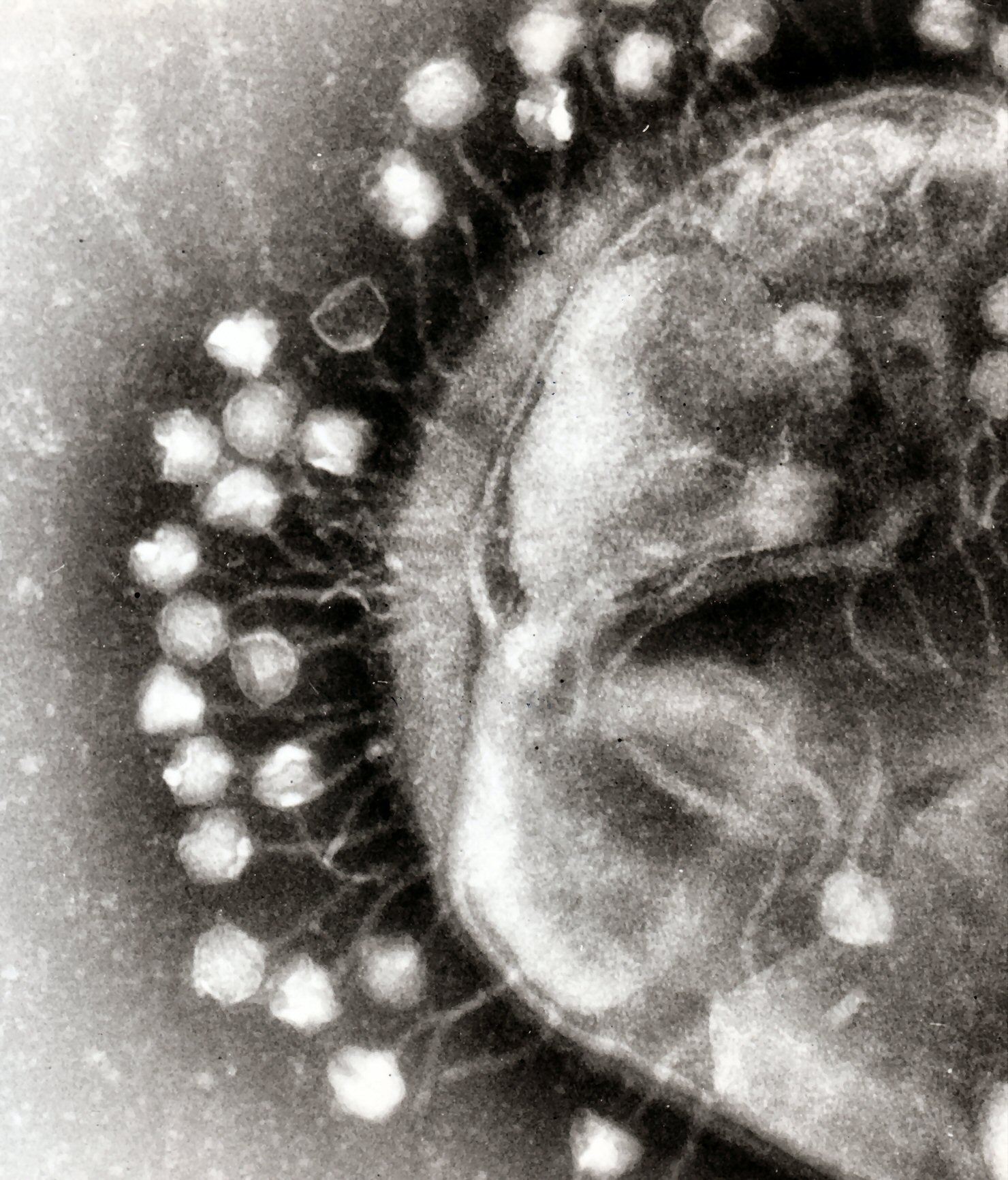
An electron micrograph of bacteriophages attached to a bacterial cell. These viruses are the size and shape of coliphage T1.

Phage therapy, viral phage therapy, or phagotherapy is the therapeutic use of bacteriophages for the treatment of pathogenic bacterial infections. This therapeutic approach emerged at the beginning of the 20th century but was progressively replaced by the use of antibiotics in most parts of the world after the Second World War. Bacteriophages, known as phages, are a form of virus that attach to bacterial cells and inject their genome into the cell. The bacteria's production of the viral genome interferes with its ability to function, halting the bacterial infection. The bacterial cell causing the infection is unable to reproduce and instead produces additional phages. Phages are selective in the strains of bacteria they are effective against.

Advantages include reduced side effects and reduced risk of the bacterium developing resistance, since bacteriophages are much more specific than antibiotics. They are typically harmless to the host organism and to other beneficial bacteria, such as the gut microbiota, reducing the chances of opportunistic infections. They have a high therapeutic index; that is, phage therapy would be expected to give rise to few side effects, even at higher-than-therapeutic levels. Because phages replicate in vivo (in cells of living organism), a smaller effective dose can be used.

Disadvantages include the difficulty of finding an effective phage for a particular infection; a phage will kill a bacterium only if it matches the specific strain. However, virulent phages can be isolated much more easily than other compounds and natural products. Consequently, phage mixtures ("cocktails") are sometimes used to improve the chances of success. Alternatively, samples taken from recovering patients sometimes contain appropriate phages that can be grown to cure other patients infected with the same strain. Ongoing challenges include the need to increase phage collections from reference phage banks, the development of efficient phage screening methods for the fast identification of the therapeutic phage(s), the establishment of efficient phage therapy strategies to tackle infectious biofilms, the validation of feasible phage production protocols that assure quality and safety of phage preparations, and the guarantee of stability of phage preparations during manufacturing, storage, and transport.

Phages tend to be more successful than antibiotics where there is a biofilm covered by a polysaccharide layer, which antibiotics typically cannot penetrate. Phage therapy can disperse the biofilm generated by antibiotic-resistant bacteria. However, the interactions between phages and biofilms can be complex, with phages developing symbiotic as well as predatory relationships with biofilms.

Phages are currently being used therapeutically to treat bacterial infections that do not respond to conventional antibiotics, particularly in Russia and Georgia. There is also a phage therapy unit in Wrocław, Poland, established in 2005, which continues several-decades-long research by the Institute of Immunology and Experimental Therapy of the Polish Academy of Sciences, the only such centre in a European Union country. Phages are the subject of renewed clinical attention in Western countries, such as the United States. In 2019, the United States Food and Drug Administration approved the first US clinical trial for intravenous phage therapy.

Phage therapy has many potential applications in human medicine as well as dentistry, veterinary science, and agriculture. If the target host of a phage therapy treatment is not an animal, the term "biocontrol" (as in phage-mediated biocontrol of bacteria) is usually employed, rather than "phage therapy".

== History ==
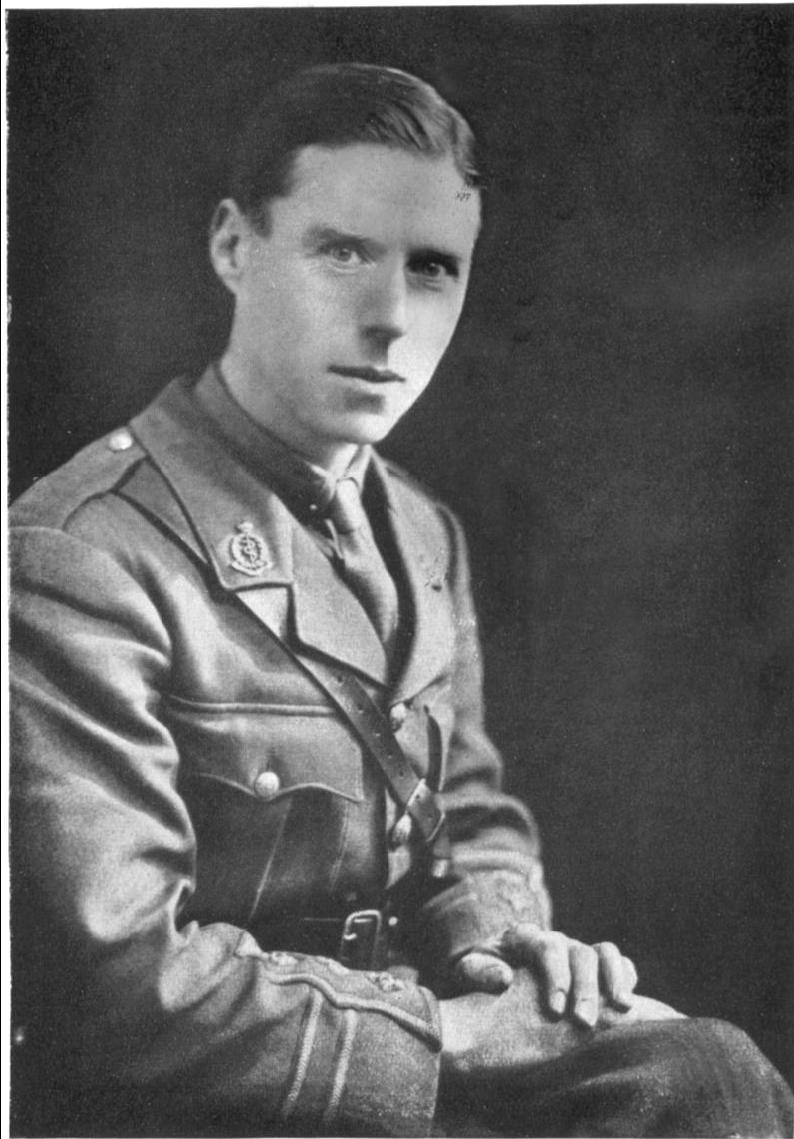
Frederick Twort

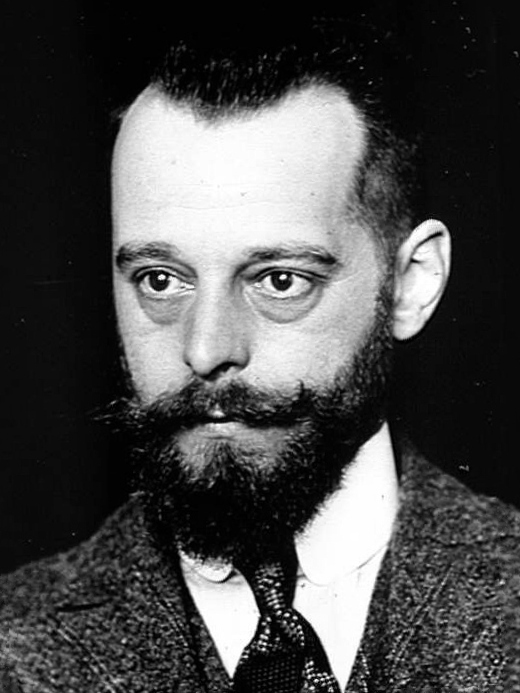
Félix d'Hérelle, discoverer of phage therapy

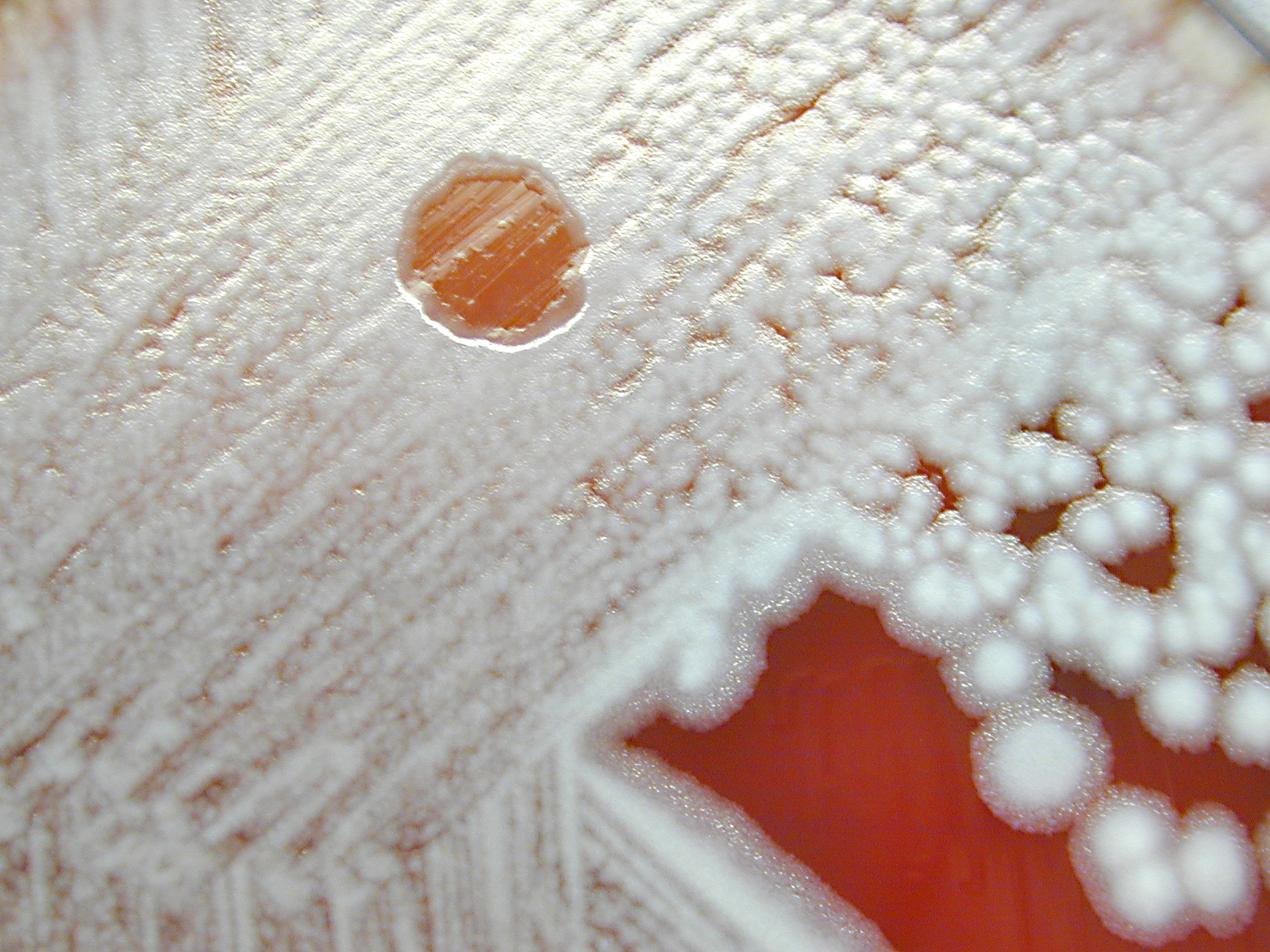
Phage in action on cultured Bacillus anthracis

The discovery of bacteriophages was reported by British bacteriologist Frederick Twort in 1915 and by French microbiologist Felix d'Hérelle in 1917. D'Hérelle said that the phages always appeared in the stools of Shigella dysentery patients shortly before they began to recover. He "quickly learned that bacteriophages are found wherever bacteria thrive: in sewers, in rivers that catch waste runoff from pipes, and in the stools of convalescent patients". Phage therapy was immediately recognized by many to be a key way forward for the eradication of pathogenic bacterial infections. In 1921, Richard Bruynoghe and his student used bacteriophages to successfully treat patients with Staphylococcus aureus-infected wounds. A Georgian, George Eliava, was making similar discoveries. He traveled to the Pasteur Institute in Paris, where he met d'Hérelle, and in 1923, he founded the Institute of Bacteriology, which later became known as the George Eliava Institute, in Tbilisi, Georgia, devoted to the development of phage therapy. Phage therapy is used in Russia, Georgia and Poland, and was used prophylactically for a time in the Soviet army, particularly during the Second World War.

In the Soviet Union, extensive research and development soon began in this field. In the United States during the 1940s, commercialization of phage therapy was undertaken by Eli Lilly and Company.

While knowledge was being accumulated regarding the biology of phages and how to use phage cocktails correctly, early uses of phage therapy were often unreliable. Since the early 20th century, research into the development of viable therapeutic antibiotics had also been underway, and by 1942, the antibiotic penicillin G had been successfully purified and saw use during the Second World War. The drug proved to be extraordinarily effective in the treatment of injured Allied soldiers whose wounds had become infected. By 1944, large-scale production of penicillin had been made possible, and in 1945, it became publicly available in pharmacies. Due to the drug's success, it was marketed widely in the US and Europe, leading Western scientists to mostly lose interest in further use and study of phage therapy for some time.

Isolated from Western advances in antibiotic production in the 1940s, Soviet scientists continued to develop already successful phage therapy to treat the wounds of soldiers in field hospitals. During World War II, the Soviet Union used bacteriophages to treat soldiers infected with various bacterial diseases, such as dysentery and gangrene. Soviet researchers continued to develop and to refine their treatments and to publish their research and results. However, due to the scientific barriers of the Cold War, this knowledge was not translated and did not proliferate across the world. A summary of these publications was published in English in 2009 in "A Literature Review of the Practical Application of Bacteriophage Research".

There is an extensive library and research center at the George Eliava Institute in Tbilisi, Georgia. Phage therapy is today a widespread form of treatment in that region.

As a result of the development of antibiotic resistance since the 1950s and an advancement of scientific knowledge, there has been renewed interest worldwide in the ability of phage therapy to eradicate bacterial infections and chronic polymicrobial biofilm (including in industrial situations).

Phages have been investigated as a potential means to eliminate pathogens like Campylobacter in raw food and Listeria in fresh food or to reduce food spoilage bacteria. In agricultural practice, phages have been used to fight pathogens like Campylobacter, Escherichia, and Salmonella in farm animals, Lactococcus and Vibrio pathogens in fish aquaculture, and Erwinia, Xanthomonas, and others in plants of agricultural importance. The oldest use is, however, in human medicine. Phages have been used against diarrheal diseases caused by E. coli, Shigella, or Vibrio and against wound infections caused by facultative pathogens of the skin like staphylococci and streptococci. Recently, the phage therapy approach has been applied to systemic and even intracellular infections, and non-replicating phage and isolated phage enzymes like lysins have been added to the antimicrobial arsenal. However, actual proof for the efficacy of these phage approaches in the field or the hospital is not available.

Some of the interest in the West can be traced back to 1994, when James Soothill demonstrated (in an animal model) that the use of phages could improve the success of skin grafts by reducing the underlying Pseudomonas aeruginosa infection. Recent studies have provided additional support for these findings in the model system.

Although not "phage therapy" in the original sense, the use of phages as delivery mechanisms for traditional antibiotics constitutes another possible therapeutic use. The use of phages to deliver antitumor agents has also been described in preliminary in vitro experiments for cells in tissue culture.

In June 2015, the European Medicines Agency hosted a one-day workshop on the therapeutic use of bacteriophages, and in July 2015, the US National Institutes of Health hosted a two-day workshop titled "Bacteriophage Therapy: An Alternative Strategy to Combat Drug Resistance".

In January 2016, phages were used successfully at Yale University by Benjamin Chan to treat a chronic Pseudomonas aeruginosa infection in ophthalmologist Ali Asghar Khodadoust. This successful treatment of a life-threatening infection sparked a resurgence of interest in phage therapy in the United States.

In 2017, a pair of genetically engineered phages along with one naturally occurring (so-called "phage Muddy") each from among those catalogued by SEA-PHAGES (Science Education Alliance-Phage Hunters Advancing Genomics and Evolutionary Science) at the Howard Hughes Medical Institute by Graham Hatfull and colleagues, was used by microbiologist James Soothill at Great Ormond Street Hospital for Children in London to treat an antibiotic-resistant bacterial (Mycobacterium abscessus) infection in a young woman with cystic fibrosis.

In 2022, two mycobacteriophages were administered intravenously twice daily to a young man with treatment-refractory Mycobacterium abscessus pulmonary infection and severe cystic fibrosis lung disease. Airway cultures for M. abscessus became negative after approximately 100 days of combined phage and antibiotic treatment, and a variety of biomarkers confirmed the therapeutic response. The individual received a bilateral lung transplant after 379 days of treatment, and cultures from the explanted lung tissue confirmed eradication of the bacteria. In a second case, successful treatment of disseminated cutaneous Mycobacterium chelonae was reported with a single phage administered intravenously twice daily in conjunction with antibiotic and surgical management.

== Potential benefits ==
Phage therapy is the use of bacteriophages to treat bacterial infections.

Bacteriophage treatment offers a possible alternative to conventional antibiotic treatments for bacterial infection. It is conceivable that, although bacteria can develop resistance to phages, the resistance might be easier to overcome than resistance to antibiotics. Viruses, just like bacteria, can evolve resistance to different treatments.

Bacteriophages are specific, targeting only one or a few strains of bacteria. Traditional antibiotics have a more wide-ranging effect, killing both harmful and useful bacteria, such as those facilitating food digestion. The species and strain specificity of bacteriophages makes it unlikely that harmless or useful bacteria will be killed when fighting an infection.

A few research groups in the West are engineering a broader-spectrum phage and also a variety of forms of MRSA treatments, including impregnated wound dressings, preventive treatment for burn victims, and phage-impregnated sutures. Beyond MRSA, phage therapy is also being investigated as an alternative strategy for other multidrug-resistant pathogens, such as enterococci. Enzybiotics are a new development at Rockefeller University that create enzymes from phages. Purified recombinant phage enzymes can be used as separate antibacterial agents in their own right.

Phage therapy also has the potential to prevent or treat infectious diseases of corals. This could mitigate the global coral decline.

Proportions of bacterial strains supporting bacteriophage replication grouped by bacteriophage families

Proportions of bacterial strains supporting bacteriophage replication grouped by host species

== Applications ==
=== Collection ===
Phages for therapeutic use can be collected from environmental sources that likely contain high quantities of bacteria and bacteriophages, such as effluent outlets, sewage, or even soil. The samples are taken and applied to bacterial cultures that are to be targeted. If the bacteria die, the phages can be grown in liquid cultures.

=== Modes of treatment ===
Phages are "bacterium-specific", and therefore, it is necessary in many cases to take a swab from the patient and culture it prior to treatment. Occasionally, isolation of therapeutic phages can require a few months to complete, but clinics generally keep supplies of phage cocktails for the most common bacterial strains in a geographical area.

Phage cocktails are commonly sold in pharmacies in Eastern European countries, such as Russia and Georgia. The composition of bacteriophagic cocktails has been periodically modified to add phages effective against emerging pathogenic strains.

Phages in practice are applied orally, topically on infected wounds or spread onto surfaces, or during surgical procedures. Injection is rarely used, avoiding any risks of trace chemical contaminants that may be present from the bacteria amplification stage, and recognizing that the immune system naturally fights against viruses introduced into the bloodstream or lymphatic system.

Reviews of phage therapy indicate that more clinical and microbiological research is needed to meet current standards.

=== Clinical trials ===
Funding for phage therapy research and clinical trials is generally insufficient and difficult to obtain, since it is a lengthy and complex process to patent bacteriophage products. Due to the specificity of phages, phage therapy would be most effective as a cocktail injection, a modality generally rejected by the US Food and Drug Administration (FDA). Therefore, researchers and observers have predicted that if phage therapy is to gain traction, the FDA must change its regulatory stance on combination drug cocktails. Public awareness and education about phage therapy are generally limited to scientific or independent research rather than mainstream media.

Phage therapy practitioners say that clinical trials are difficult to conduct, because it is a highly individualized medicine, and each patient needs a different phage or phage cocktail.

In 2007, phase-1 and 2 clinical trials were completed at the Royal National Throat, Nose and Ear Hospital, London, for Pseudomonas aeruginosa infections (otitis). Phase-1 clinical trials were conducted at the Southwest Regional Wound Care Center of Lubbock, Texas, for a cocktail of phages against P. aeruginosa, Staphylococcus aureus, and Escherichia coli, developed by Intralytix. PhagoBurn, a phase-1 and 2 trial of phage therapy against P. aeruginosa wound infection in France and Belgium in 2015–17, was terminated early due to lack of effectiveness.

Locus Biosciences has created a cocktail of three CRISPR-modified phages. A 2019 study examined its effectiveness against E. coli in the urinary tract, and a phase-1 trial was completed shortly before March 2021. In February 2019, the FDA approved the first clinical trial of intravenously administered phage therapy in the United States.

In July 2020, the FDA approved the first clinical trial of nebulized phage therapy in the United States. This double-blind, placebo-controlled study at Yale University will be focused on treating P. aeruginosa infections in patients with cystic fibrosis.

In February 2020, the FDA approved a clinical trial to evaluate bacteriophage therapy in patients with urinary tract infections. The study started in December 2020 and aims to identify ideal bacteriophage treatment regimens based on improvements in disease control rates.

In February 2021, the FDA approved a clinical trial to evaluate bacteriophage therapy in patients with chronic prosthetic joint infections (PJI). The study was to begin in October 2022 and be conducted by Adaptive Phage Therapeutics, in collaboration with the Mayo Clinic.

As of February 2025, more than 60 phage studies were listed on ClinicalTrials.gov as either planned, actively recruiting or completed.

=== Administration ===
==== As pills ====
If administered as pills, phages can be freeze-dried; this procedure does not reduce efficacy. Temperature stability up to 55 °C and shelf lives of 14 months have been shown for some types of phages in pill form.

==== Liquid ====
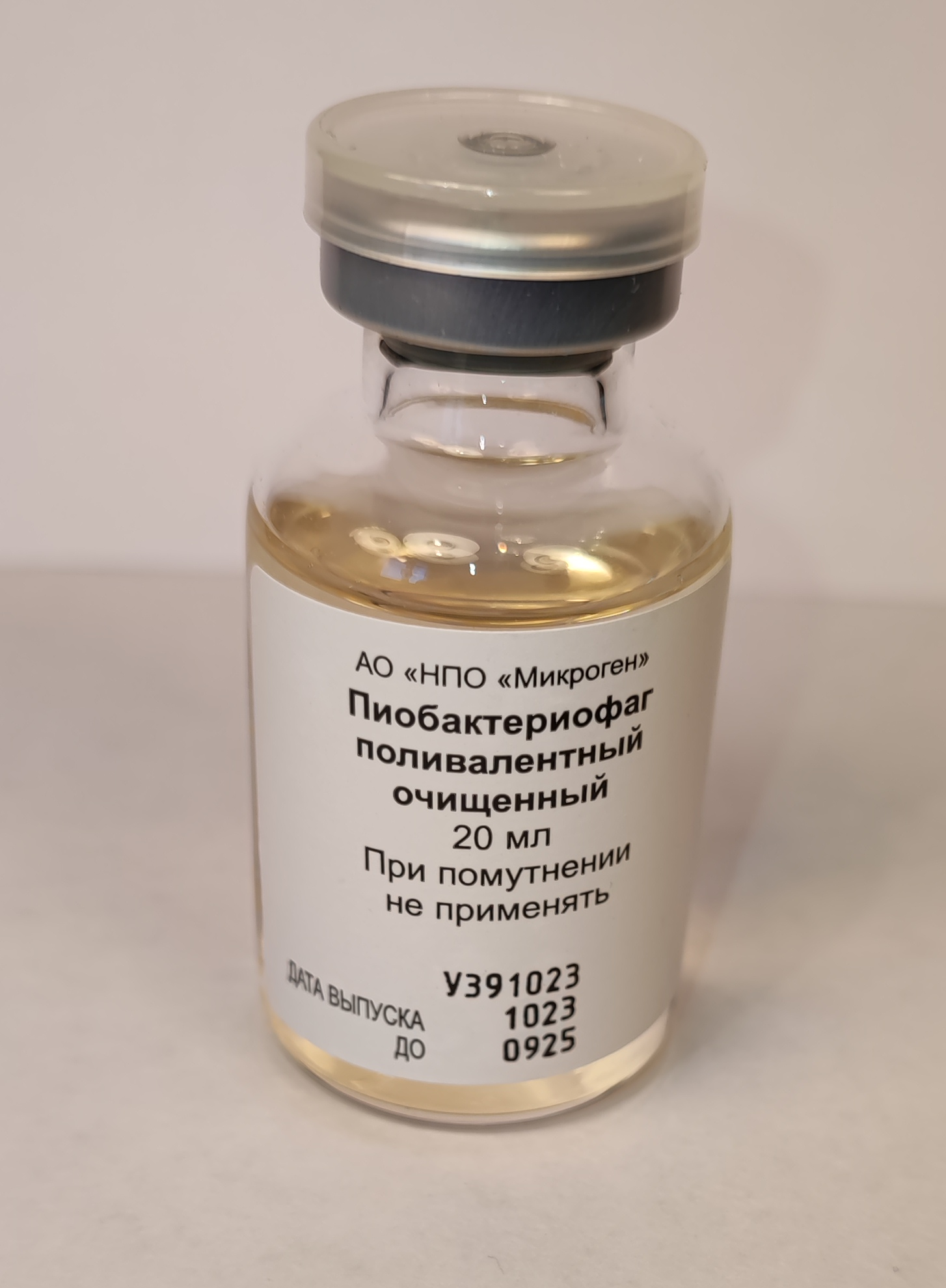
Liquid bacteriophage formulation manufactured in Russia

Application in liquid form is possible, stored preferably in refrigerated vials. Oral administration works better when an antacid is included, as this increases the number of phages surviving passage through the stomach. Topical administration often involves application to gauzes that are laid on the area to be treated. Liquid bacteriophages are also used for local applications, such as wound dressings and topical treatments, as well as external administration, including sprays and rinses.

==== Via nebulizer ====
The July 2020 application for FDA approval for the first clinical trial of nebulized phage therapy in the United States does not specify a particular type of nebulizer, such as a compressor or ultrasound type. Bacteriophages are studied as potential candidates for treating bacterial lung infections, especially those caused by multidrug-resistant (MDR) bacteria. In these studies, bacteriophage solutions are administered via nebulizers, mostly using the compressor type. The stability and viability of phages during nebulization are important for their therapeutic efficacy. Current studies focus on whether phages can remain viable and effective when delivered via nebulizers. The choice of nebulizer can impact the stability and delivery efficiency of phages. Compressor nebulizers are commonly used because they generate a fine mist that can reach the lower respiratory tract.

In contrast to the compressor nebulizers, the ultrasound nebulizers can impact the viability of bacteriophages. The ultrasonic waves used to generate the aerosol can cause physical damage to the phages, potentially reducing their effectiveness. Preliminary research suggests the high-frequency vibrations and heat generated during the nebulization process can lead to a significant loss of phage activity. Consequently, one of the main challenges is ensuring that the phages remain undamaged during the nebulization process. Studies have shown that phages can be sensitive to the shear forces generated during nebulization. Still, with proper formulation and device selection, it is possible to maintain their viability, as the current research suggests.

=== Successful treatments ===
Phages were used successfully at Yale University by Benjamin Chan to treat a Pseudomonas infection in 2016. Intravenous phage drip therapy was successfully used to treat a patient with multidrug-resistant Acinetobacter baumannii in Thornton Hospital at UC San Diego in 2017. Nebulized phage therapy has been used successfully to treat numerous patients with cystic fibrosis and multidrug-resistant bacteria at Yale University as part of their compassionate use program. In 2019, a Brownsville, Minnesota resident with a long-standing bacterial infection in his knee received a phage treatment at the Mayo Clinic that eliminated the need for amputation of his lower leg. Individualised phage therapy was also successfully used by Robert T. Schooley and others to treat a case of multi-drug-resistant Acinetobacter baumannii in 2015. In 2022, an individually adjusted phage-antibiotic combination as an antimicrobial resistance treatment was demonstrated and described in detail. The scientists called for scaling up the research and for further development of this approach.

=== Treatment of biofilm infections ===
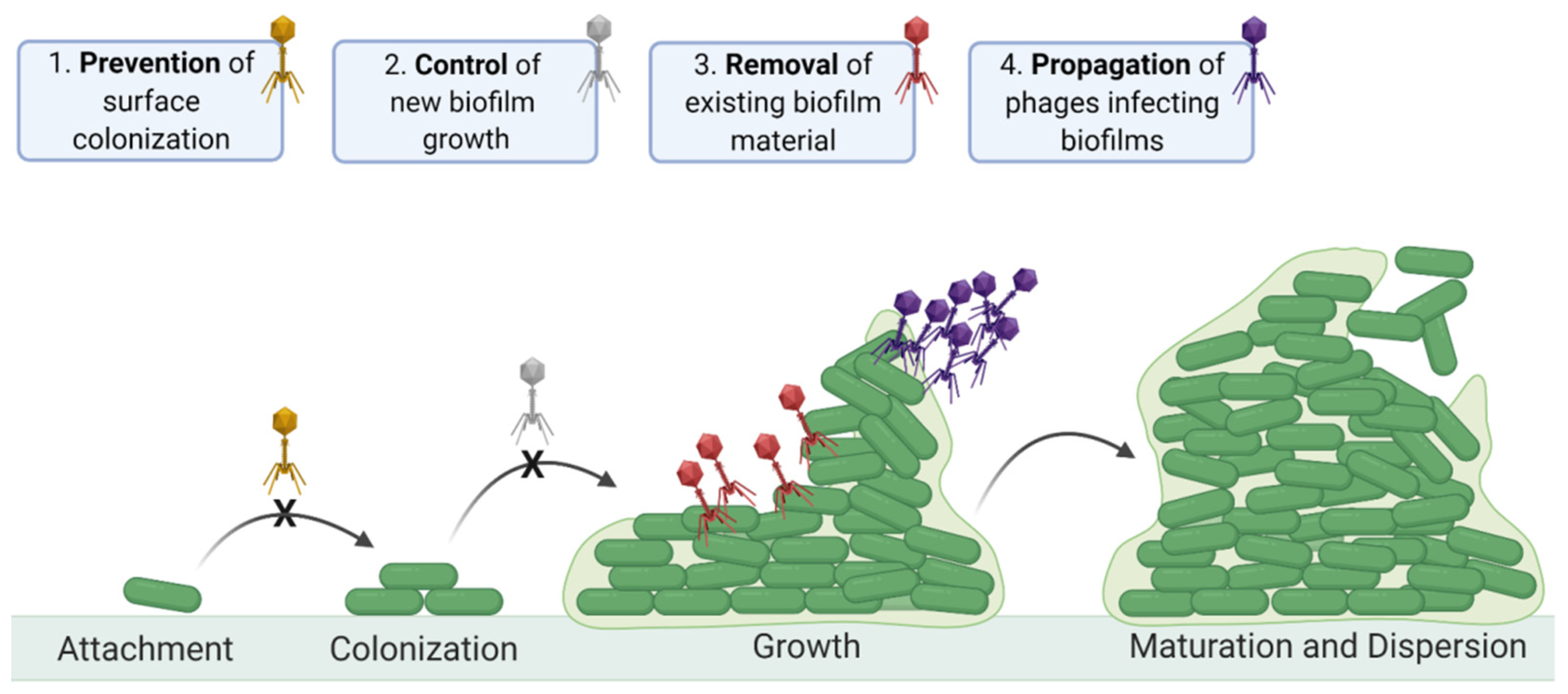
The different steps at which phages may disrupt biofilm formation. The biofilm surrounding the bacteria would inhibit the ability of antibiotics to reach bacteria, but may have less impact on the phages.

Phage therapy is being used to great effect in the treatment of biofilm infections, especially Pseudomonas aeruginosa and Staphylococcus aureus. From 78 recent cases of treatment of biofilm infections, 96% of patients saw clinical improvement using phage therapy, and 52% of patients saw complete symptom relief or a full expungement of the affecting bacteria. Biofilm infections are challenging to treat with antibiotics. The biofilm matrix and surrounding bacterial membranes can bind to the antibiotics, preventing them from penetrating the biofilm. The matrix may contain enzymes that deactivate antibiotics. Biofilms also have low metabolic activity, which means antibiotics that target growing processes have much lower efficacy. These factors make phage therapy an enticing option for the treatment of such infections, and there are currently two ways to go about such treatment. The first is to isolate the initial bacteria and make a specific treatment phage to target it, while the second way is to use a combination of more general phages. The advantage of the second method is that it can easily be made commercially available for treatment, although there are some concerns that it may be substantially less effective.

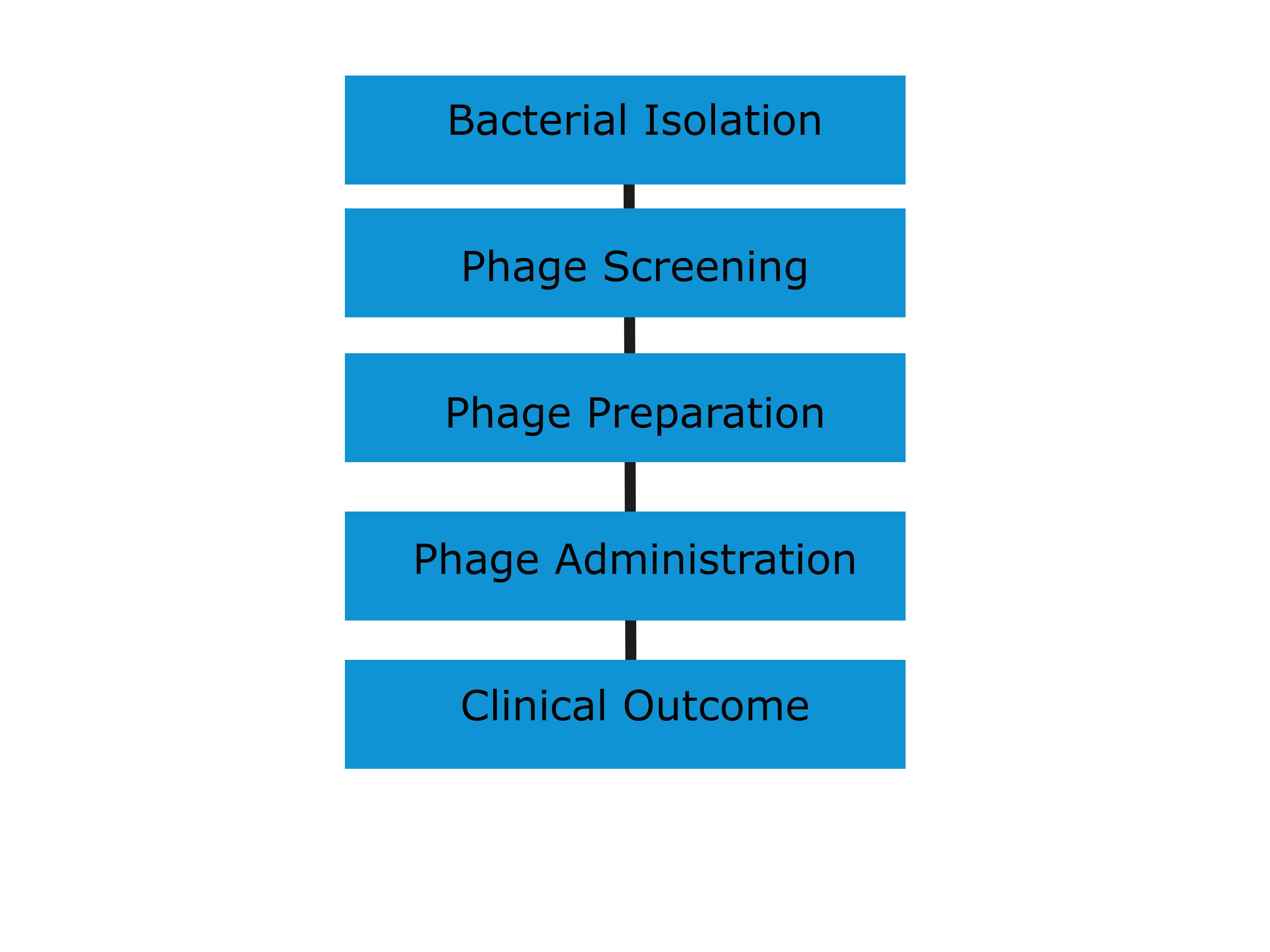
The process of treating biofilms or more generic infections using phage therapy. Depending on the case, steps 2 and 3 may involve either specially tailored phages or more general alternatives.

== Genetic engineering of bacteriophages ==
Genetic engineering and synthetic biology are being investigated to modify bacteriophages for therapeutic, diagnostic, and delivery applications. Methods described in the scientific literature include phage recombineering, CRISPR–Cas-assisted genome editing, retron-based editing, and the synthetic assembly of phage genomes followed by their reactivation in bacterial or cell-free systems.

One objective of phage engineering is to modify the host range of bacteriophages. Changes to tail-fibre proteins and receptor-binding proteins can alter the recognition of bacterial surface receptors and may enable phages to target additional bacterial strains. Researchers have also investigated the use of CRISPR–Cas systems to modify phage genomes and develop more precisely targeted antibacterial approaches.

Engineered phages have also been studied as delivery vehicles for antimicrobial proteins, peptides, and CRISPR–Cas systems. These approaches aim to deliver antibacterial components to specific bacterial targets or interfere with selected bacterial genes. Such strategies are being explored as potential tools against bacterial infections, including those involving antibiotic-resistant organisms.

Research has also explored non-replicating phage particles and biocontainment strategies intended to reduce uncontrolled replication and environmental spread. However, the development of engineered phage therapeutics raises biosafety and regulatory questions. Current research examines how to balance biological containment, therapeutic effectiveness, and the possibility of the emergence of escape variants.

== Limitations ==
The high bacterial strain specificity of phage therapy may make it necessary for clinics to make different cocktails for treatment of the same infection or disease, because the bacterial components of such diseases may differ from region to region or even person to person. In addition, this means that "banks" containing many different phages must be kept and regularly updated with new phages.

Further, bacteria can evolve different receptors either before or during treatment. This can prevent phages from completely eradicating them.

The need for banks of phages makes regulatory testing for safety harder and more expensive under current rules in most countries. Such a process would make the large-scale use of phage therapy difficult. Additionally, patent issues (specifically on living organisms) may complicate distribution for pharmaceutical companies wishing to have exclusive rights over their "invention", which would discourage a commercial corporation from investing capital in this.

As has been known for at least thirty years, mycobacteria such as Mycobacterium tuberculosis have specific bacteriophages. No lytic phage has yet been discovered for Clostridioides difficile, which is responsible for many nosocomial diseases, but some temperate phages (integrated in the genome, also called lysogenic) are known for this species; this opens encouraging avenues but with additional risks, as discussed below.

The negative public perception of viruses may contribute to the reluctance to embrace phage therapy.

=== Development of resistance ===
One of the major concerns usually associated with phage therapy is the emergence of bacteriophage-insensitive mutants (BIMs) that could hinder the success of this therapy. Several in vitro studies have reported a fast emergence of BIMs within a short time after phage treatment. The emergence of BIMs has also been observed in vivo using different animal models, although this usually occurs later than in vitro (reviewed in). This fast adaptation of bacteria to phage attack is usually caused by mutations on genes encoding phage receptors, which include lipopolysaccharides (LPS), outer membrane proteins, capsules, flagella, and pili, among others. However, some studies suggest that when phage resistance is caused by mutations in phage receptors, this might result in fitness costs to the resistance bacterium, which will ultimately become less virulent. Moreover, it has been shown that the evolution of bacterial resistance to phage attack changes the efflux pump mechanism, causing increased sensitivity to drugs from several antibiotic classes. Therefore, it is conceivable to think that phage therapy that uses phages that exert selection for multidrug-resistant bacteria to become antibiotic-sensitive could potentially reduce the incidence of antibiotic-resistant infections.

Besides the prevention of phage adsorption by loss or modification of bacterial receptors, phage insensitivity can be caused by: prevention of phage DNA entry by superinfection exclusion systems; or degradation of phage DNA by restriction-modification systems or by CRISPR-Cas systems; and use of abortive infection systems that block phage replication, transcription, or translation, usually in conjunction with suicide of the host cell. Altogether, these mechanisms promote a quick adaptation of bacteria to phage attack and therefore, the emergence of phage-resistant mutants is frequent and unavoidable.

It is still unclear whether the wide use of phages would cause resistance similar to what has been observed for antibiotics. In theory, this is unlikely to occur, since phages are specific, and therefore, their selective pressure would affect a narrow group of bacteria. However, we should also consider the fact that many phage resistance systems are mounted on mobile genetic elements, including prophages and plasmids, and thus may spread quite rapidly even without direct selection. Nevertheless, in contrast to antibiotics, phage preparations for therapeutic applications are expected to be developed in a personalized way because of the high specificity of phages. In addition, strategies have been proposed to counter the problem of phage resistance. One of the strategies is the use of phage cocktails with complementary host ranges (different host ranges, which, when combined, result in an overall broader host range) and targeting different bacterial receptors. Another strategy is the combination of phages with other antimicrobials such as antibiotics, disinfectants, or enzymes that could enhance their antibacterial activity. The genetic manipulation of phage genomes can also be a strategy to improve therapeutic success, for example if designed to harbor counter-defensomes specifically targeting bacteria with compatible defensomes (e.g. anti-R–M versus R–M).

== Safety aspects ==
Bacteriophages are bacterial viruses, evolved to infect bacterial cells. To do that, phages must use characteristic structures at cell surfaces (receptors), and to propagate they need appropriate molecular tools inside the cells. Bacteria are prokaryotes, and their cells differ substantially from eukaryotes, including humans or animals. For this reason, phages meet the major safety requirement: they do not infect treated individuals. Even engineered phages and induced artificial internalization of phages into mammalian cells do not result in phage propagation. Natural transcytosis of unmodified phages, that is, uptake and internal transport to the other side of a cell, which was observed in human epithelial cells, did not result in phage propagation or cell damage. Recently, however, it was reported that filamentous temperate phages of P. aeruginosa can be endocytosed into human and murine leukocytes, resulting in transcription of the phage DNA. In turn, the product RNA triggers maladaptive innate viral pattern-recognition responses and thus inhibits the immune clearance of the bacteria. Whether this also applies to dsDNA phages like Caudovirales has not yet been established; this is an important question to be addressed as it may affect the overall safety of phage therapy.

Due to many experimental treatments in human patients conducted in past decades, and to already existing RCTs (see section: Clinical experience and randomized controlled trials), phage safety can be assessed directly. The first safety trial in healthy human volunteers for a phage was conducted by Bruttin and Brüssow in 2005. They investigated the oral administration of Escherichia coli phage T4 and found no adverse effects of the treatment.

Historical record shows that phages are safe, with mild side effects, if any. Still, administering bacteriophages can induce an immune response. Macrophages, key cells of the innate immune system, mediate this response. The most frequent (though still rare) adverse reactions to phage preparations found in patients were symptoms from the digestive tract, local reactions at the site of administration of a phage preparation, superinfections, and a rise in body temperature. These reactions might have occurred because either toxins were released from bacteria destroyed by the phages—such toxin release from bacteria can also happen with antibiotic use—or due to leftover bacterial fragments or residual components from the bacterial growth medium ("food for bacteria") present in the phage treatment when unpurified preparations were used.

When bacteriophages are introduced into the body, they may be recognized as foreign entities by macrophages through pattern recognition receptors (PRRs) such as Toll-like receptors (TLRs). The binding of bacteriophages to these receptors triggers macrophage activation, leading to phagocytosis (macrophages engulf and digest the bacteriophages) and cytokine production: activated macrophages produce pro-inflammatory cytokines. These cytokines can modulate the immune response but generally do not result in significant fever when phages are used appropriately.

The route by which bacteriophages enter the body can affect the degree of immune activation. Applying bacteriophages directly to the mucosa targets the site of infection with minimal systemic exposure, leading to a localized immune response. Injecting bacteriophages into muscle tissue introduces them to a larger number of macrophages in the muscle and regional lymph nodes. In intravenous injection, direct introduction into the bloodstream exposes bacteriophages to macrophages throughout the body, including those in the spleen and liver. However, significant elevations in body temperature are uncommon and typically only observed in cases of rapid phage administration or high doses. Anticipating immune responses allows healthcare professionals to monitor patients appropriately and make treatment adjustments if necessary. Macrophages are integral to the body's immune response to bacteriophage therapy, mediating any potential immune reactions. Intravenous administration of bacteriophages is conducted under strict medical supervision, by specialists in infectious diseases within a hospital setting, due to potential adverse reactions. Adverse reactions to intravenous bacteriophage therapy may include hypotension, i.e., a drop in blood pressure, leading to loss of consciousness. A sudden drop (chills) and rise (fever) in body temperature, known as the Jarisch–Herxheimer reaction, can occur due to the rapid lysis of bacteria and release of endotoxins. Rapid bacterial lysis releases endotoxins (e.g., lipopolysaccharides from gram-negative bacteria) that trigger systemic inflammatory responses, including "cytokine storms". Continuous monitoring of heart rate, blood pressure, and temperature to detect early signs of adverse reactions is done after the intravenous phage administration. Successful treatment of life-threatening infections with intravenous phage therapy has been documented. Patients have responded to therapy after one or several intravenous administrations, clearing infections that were unresponsive to conventional treatments: phages can disrupt biofilms, which are often resistant to antibiotics, enhancing infection clearance.

Bacteriophages must be produced in bacteria that are lysed (i.e., fragmented) during phage propagation. As such, phage lysates contain bacterial debris that may affect the human organism even when the phage itself is harmless. For these and other reasons, purification of bacteriophages is considered important, and phage preparations need to be assessed for their safety as a whole, particularly when phages are to be administered intravenously. This is consistent with general procedures for other drug candidates. In 2015, a group of phage therapy experts summarized the quality and safety requirements for sustainable phage therapy.

Phage effects on the human microbiome also contribute to safety issues in phage therapy. Many phages, especially temperate ones, carry genes that can affect the pathogenicity of the host. Even lambda, a temperate phage of the E. coli K-12 laboratory strain, carries two genes that provide potential virulence benefits to the lysogenic host, one that increases intestinal adherence and the other that confers resistance to complement killing in the blood. For this reason, temperate phages are generally to be avoided as candidates for phage therapy, although in some cases, the lack of lytic phage candidates and emergency conditions may make such considerations moot. Another potential problem is generalized transduction, a term for the ability of some phages to transfer bacterial DNA from one host to another. This occurs because the systems for packaging of the phage DNA into capsids can mistakenly package host DNA instead. Indeed, with some well-characterized phages, up to 5% of the virus particles contain only bacterial DNA. Thus in a typical lysate, the entire genome of the propagating host is present in more than a million copies in every milliliter. For these reasons, it is imperative that any phage to be considered for therapeutic usage should be subjected to thorough genomic analysis and tested for the capacity for generalized transduction.

As antibacterials, phages may also affect the composition of microbiomes, by infecting and killing phage-sensitive strains of bacteria. However, a major advantage of bacteriophages over antibiotics is the high specificity of bacteriophages. This specificity limits antibacterial activity to a sub-species level; typically, a phage kills only selected bacterial strains. For this reason, phages are much less likely (than antibiotics) to disturb the composition of a natural microbiome or to induce dysbiosis. This was demonstrated in experimental studies where microbiome composition was assessed by next-generation sequencing that revealed no important changes correlated with phage treatment in human treatments.

Much of the difficulty in obtaining regulatory approval is proving to be the risks of using a self-replicating entity that has the capability to evolve.

As with antibiotic therapy and other methods of countering bacterial infections, endotoxins are released by the bacteria as they are destroyed within the patient (Jarisch–Herxheimer reaction). This can cause symptoms of fever; in extreme cases, toxic shock (a problem also seen with antibiotics) is possible. Janakiraman Ramachandran argues that this complication can be avoided in those types of infection where this reaction is likely to occur by using genetically engineered bacteriophages that have had their gene responsible for producing endolysin removed. Without this gene, the host bacterium still dies but remains intact, because the lysis is disabled. On the other hand, this modification stops the exponential growth of phages, so one administered phage means at most one dead bacterial cell. Eventually, these dead cells are consumed by the normal house-cleaning duties of the phagocytes, which use enzymes to break down the whole bacterium and its contents into harmless proteins, polysaccharides, and lipids.

Temperate (or lysogenic) bacteriophages are not generally used therapeutically, since this group can act as a way for bacteria to exchange DNA. This can help spread antibiotic resistance or even, theoretically, make the bacteria pathogenic, such as in cases of cholera. Carl Merril has claimed that harmless strains of corynebacterium may have been converted into C. diphtheriae that "probably killed a third of all Europeans who came to North America in the seventeenth century". Fortunately, many phages seem to be lytic only with negligible probability of becoming lysogenic.

== Regulation and legislation ==
Approval of phage therapy for use in humans has not been given in Western countries, with a few exceptions. In the United States, Washington and Oregon law allows naturopathic physicians to use any therapy that is legal anywhere in the world on an experimental basis, and in Texas, phages are considered natural substances and can be used in addition to (but not as a replacement for) traditional therapy (they have been used routinely in a wound care clinic in Lubbock since 2006).

In 2013, "the 20th biennial Evergreen International Phage Meeting ... conference drew 170 participants from 35 countries, including leaders of companies and institutes involved with human phage therapies from France, Australia, Georgia, Poland, and the United States."

In France, phage therapy disappeared officially with the withdrawal of the Vidal dictionary (France's official drug directory), in 1978. The last phage preparation, produced by l'Institut du Bactériophage, was an ointment against skin infections. Phage therapy research ceased at about the same time across the country, with the closure of the bacteriophage department at the Pasteur Institute. Some hospital physicians continued to offer phage therapy until the 1990s, when production died out.

On their rediscovery, at the end of the 1990s, phage preparations were classified as medicines, i.e., "medicinal products" in the EU or "drugs" in the US. However, the pharmaceutical legislation that had been implemented since their disappearance from Western medicine was mainly designed to cater for industrially-made pharmaceuticals, devoid of any customization and intended for large-scale distribution, and it was not deemed necessary to provide phage-specific requirements or concessions.

Today's phage therapy products need to comply with the entire battery of medicinal product licensing requirements: manufacturing according to GMP, preclinical studies, phase I, II, and III clinical trials, and marketing authorisation. Technically, industrially produced predefined phage preparations could make it through the conventional pharmaceutical processes, minding some adaptations. However, phage specificity and resistance issues are likely to cause these defined preparations to have a relatively short useful lifespan. The pharmaceutical industry is currently not considering phage therapy products. Yet, a handful of small and medium-sized enterprises have shown interest, with the help of risk capital and/or public funding. Currently, no defined therapeutic phage product has made it to the EU or US markets.

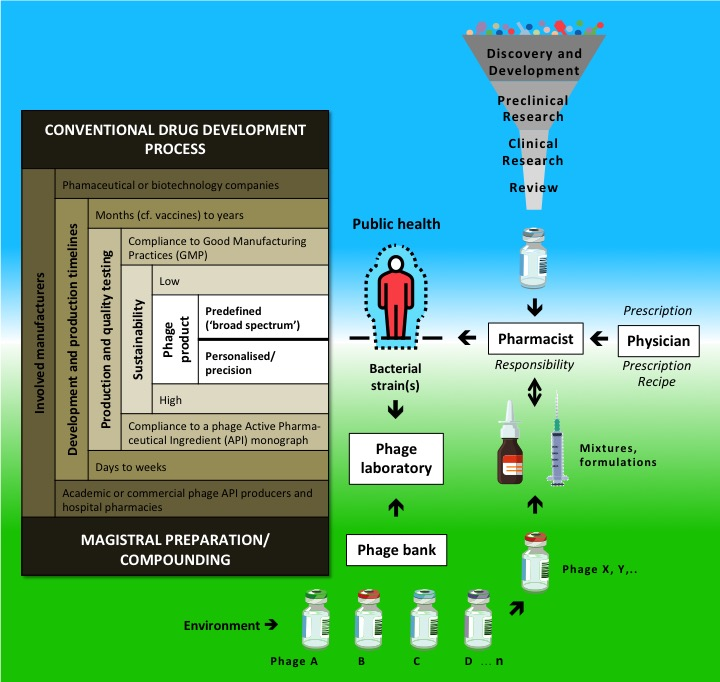
Conventional drug development process vs. magistral preparation

According to Jean-Paul Pirnay, therapeutic phages should be prepared individually and kept in large phage banks, ready to be used, upon testing for effectiveness against the patient's bacterial pathogen(s). Intermediary or combined (industrially made as well as precision phage preparations) approaches could be appropriate. However, it turns out to be difficult to reconcile classical phage therapy concepts, which are based on the timely adaptation of phage preparations, with current Western pharmaceutical R&D and marketing models. Repeated calls for a specific regulatory framework have not been heeded by European policymakers. A phage therapy framework based on the Biological Master File concept has been proposed as a (European) solution to regulatory issues, but European regulations do not allow for an extension of this concept to biologically active substances such as phages.

Meanwhile, representatives from the medical, academic, and regulatory communities have established some (temporary) national solutions. For instance, phage applications have been performed in Europe under the umbrella of Article 37 (Unproven Interventions in Clinical Practice) of the Helsinki Declaration. To enable the application of phage therapy after Poland had joined the EU in 2004, the Ludwik Hirszfeld Institute of Immunology and Experimental Therapy in Wrocław opened its own Phage Therapy Unit (PTU). Phage therapy performed at the PTU is considered an "experimental treatment", covered by the adapted Act of 5 December 1996 on the Medical Profession (Polish Law Gazette, 2011, No. 277 item 1634) and Article 37 of the Helsinki Declaration. Similarly, in the last few years, a number of phage therapy interventions have been performed in the US under the FDA's emergency Investigational New Drug (eIND) protocol.

Some patients have been treated with phages under the umbrella of "compassionate use", which is a treatment option that allows a physician to use a not-yet-authorized medicine in desperate cases. Under strict conditions, medicines under development can be made available for use in patients for whom no satisfactory authorized therapies are available and who cannot participate in clinical trials. In principle, this approach can only be applied to products for which earlier study results have demonstrated efficacy and safety, but have not yet been approved. Much like Article 37 of the Helsinki Declaration, the compassionate use treatment option can only be applied when the phages are expected to help in life-threatening or chronic and/or seriously debilitating diseases that are not treatable with formally approved products.

In France, ANSM, the French medicine agency, has organized a specific committee—Comité Scientifique Spécialisé Temporaire (CSST)—for phage therapy, which consists of experts in various fields. Their task is to evaluate and guide each phage therapy request that ends up at the ANSM. Phage therapy requests are discussed together with the treating physicians and consensus advice is sent to the ANSM], which then decides whether or not to grant permission. Between 2006 and 2018, fifteen patients were treated in France (eleven recovered) using this pathway.

In Belgium, in 2016 and in response to a number of parliamentary questions, Maggie De Block, the Minister of Social Affairs and Health, acknowledged that it is indeed not evident to treat phages as industrially made drugs, and therefore she proposed to investigate if the magistral preparation pathway could offer a solution. Magistral preparations (compounding pharmacies in the US) are not subjected to certain constraints such as GMP compliance and marketing authorization. As the "magistral preparation framework" was created to allow for adapted patient treatments and/or to use medicines for which there is no commercial interest, it seemed a suitable framework for precision phage therapy concepts. Magistral preparations are medicines prepared in a pharmacy in accordance with a medical prescription for an individual patient. They are made by a pharmacist (or under his/her supervision) from their constituent ingredients, according to the technical and scientific standards of pharmaceutical technology. Phage active pharmaceutical ingredients to be included in magistral preparations must meet the requirements of a monograph, which describes their production and quality control testing. They must be accompanied by a certificate of analysis, issued by a "Belgian Approved Laboratory", which has been granted an accreditation to perform batch-release testing of medicinal products. Since 2019, phages have been delivered in the form of magistral preparations to nominal patients in Belgium.

The first phage therapy case in China can be traced back to 1958, at Shanghai Jiao Tong University School of Medicine. However, many regulations were not yet established back then, and phage therapy soon lost people's interest due to the prevalence of antibiotics, which eventually led to the antimicrobial resistance crisis. This prompted researchers in China as well as the Chinese government to pay attention to phage therapy again, and following the first investigator-initiated trial (IIT) by the Shanghai Institute of Phage in 2019, phage therapy rapidly flourished. Currently, commercial phage therapy applications must go through either one of two pathways. The first is for fixed-ingredient phage products. The second pathway is for personalized phage products, which need to go through IITs. This way, the products are considered restrictive medical technologies.

== Application in other species ==
=== Animals ===
Phage therapy has been a relevant mode of treatment in animals for decades. It has been proposed as a method of treating bacterial infections in the veterinary medical field in response to the rampant use of antibiotics. Studies have investigated the application of phage therapy in livestock species as well as companion animals. Brigham Young University has been researching the use of phage therapy to treat American foulbrood in honeybees. Phage therapy is also being investigated for potential applications in aquaculture.

=== Plants ===
Phage therapy has been studied for bacterial spot of stonefruit, caused by Xanthomonas pruni (syn. X. campestris pv. pruni, syn. X. arboricola pv. pruni) in prunus species. Some treatments have been successful.

== Cultural impact ==
The 1925 novel and 1926 Pulitzer Prize winner Arrowsmith by Sinclair Lewis used phage therapy as a plot point.

Greg Bear's 2002 novel Vitals features phage therapy, based on Soviet research, used to transfer genetic material.

The 2012 collection of military history essays about the changing role of women in warfare, Women in War – From Home Front to Front Line includes a chapter featuring phage therapy: "Chapter 17: Women who thawed the Cold War".

Steffanie Strathdee's book The Perfect Predator: An Epidemiologist's Journey to Save Her Husband from a Deadly Superbug, co-written with her husband, Thomas Patterson, was published by Hachette Book Group in 2019. It describes Strathdee's ultimately successful attempt to introduce phage therapy as a life-saving treatment for her husband, critically ill with a completely antibiotic-resistant Acinetobacter baumannii infection following severe pancreatitis.

== See also ==
- Antimicrobial resistance
- Paul E. Turner
- Phage display
- Phage monographs
- Prophage
