= Locus Biosciences =

Clinical phase American pharmaceutical company

- Company type: Privately held company
- Industry: Pharmaceutical company
- Founded: May 22, 2015; 11 years ago in Raleigh, NC, USA
- Headquarters: Morrisville, North Carolina, United States
- Key people: Paul Garofolo (Chief Executive Officer); Joseph Nixon (Chief Financial Officer); Paul Kim (Chief Development Officer); Nick Conley (Chief Technology Officer)
- Website: www.locus-bio.com

Locus Biosciences (Locus) is a clinical-stage pharmaceutical company based in Morrisville (Research Triangle Park), North Carolina, founded in 2015 as an NCSU spin‑out. It develops CRISPR-Cas3–enhanced bacteriophage therapies (“crPhage”) targeting drug-resistant bacterial infections. Its lead candidate, LBP‑EC01, delivered by a phage cocktail that lyses bacteria while irreversibly degrading their DNA, has completed a Phase 1b randomized, placebo‑controlled trial demonstrating safety and tolerability and has progressed to the Phase 2 ELIMINATE trial—Part 1 delivered positive open-label results and Part 2 is now underway with BARDA funding. Locus also has programs in development targeting Klebsiella pneumoniae, Pseudomonas aeruginosa, and Staphylococcus aureus, and broader microbiome‑related indications such as inflammatory bowel disease.

== History ==
Locus Biosciences was founded in 2015 and based in Research Triangle Park (RTP), North Carolina. Locus developed an AI-enabled precision medicine platform, enabling the company to develop engineered bacteriophage (phage) therapies that are designed to selectively remove particular pathogenic bacterial species from the body while leaving other non-target bacteria unaffected. Locus is advancing products to treat antibiotic-resistant bacterial infections and to treat other bacteria-driven diseases such as Crohn's disease. The company was founded based on CRISPR-Cas3 technology licensed from North Carolina State University (NCSU) in 2015. Initial funding for the company came from founder Paul Garofolo, the North Carolina Biotechnology Center, and private investors.

In 2017, the company closed a $19 million Series A financing led by Artis Ventures. This financing funded development of the company's engineered bacteriophage platform technology and preclinical development of Locus's first product.

In 2018, Locus acquired a high-throughput bacteriophage discovery platform from San Francisco-based phage therapy company EpiBiome, Inc. This acquisition dramatically expanded the scale of Locus's platform, enabling the company to discover thousands of bacteriophage for each development program and to optimize phage cocktails using artificial intelligence and machine learning tools.

In 2019, the company entered into a strategic collaboration with Janssen Pharmaceuticals (a Johnson & Johnson company) to develop engineered bacteriophage therapies targeting Pseudomonas and Staphylococcus bacteria. Under that contract, Locus was entitled to receive $20 million upfront, up to $798 million in milestone payments, and royalties on net product sales.

In 2020, Locus signed a $77 million contract as part of a $144 million collaboration with the Biomedical Advanced Research and Development Authority (BARDA), part of the United States Department of Health and Human Services, to develop LBP-EC01, an engineered bacteriophage therapy designed to treat urinary tract infections caused by antibiotic resistant strains of Escherichia coli bacteria.

Also in 2020, the company signed a $12.5 million contract with the global non-profit Combating Antibiotic-Resistant Bacteria Biopharmaceutical Accelerator (CARB-X) to fund development of an engineered bacteriophage product targeting Klebsiella pneumoniae bacteria.

In 2022, Locus closed a $35 million Series B financing with participation from existing investors such as Artis Ventures and Viking Global Investors along with new investors such as the Johnson & Johnson Development Corporation (JJDC).

Phage injecting its genome into bacterial cell

== LOCUS Platform ==
Locus Biosciences develops bacteriophage-based therapeutics using a combination of high-throughput phage discovery, computational optimization, synthetic biology, and in-house viral vector manufacturing. Its approach focuses on engineering naturally occurring bacteriophages to enhance their antibacterial activity against specific pathogens.

The company’s initial platform incorporated CRISPR-Cas3 payloads into bacteriophages to augment their ability to eliminate bacteria by degrading the bacterial genome-a mechanism distinct from the cutting action of the more widely known CRISPR-Cas9 system. This method was designed to improve phage efficacy against drug-resistant bacterial strains.

== Clinical development ==
The company enrolled its first patient in a Phase 1b clinical trial for LBP-EC01 in 2020 and successfully completed the trial in 2021. Locus subsequently announced positive results from Part 1 of a two-part Phase 2 clinical trial of LBP-EC01, which was published in The Lancet Infectious Diseases. These positive results resulted in $23.9 million additional funding from BARDA to support Part 2 of the Phase 2 clinical trial.
