= Benjamin Chan =

American Scientist

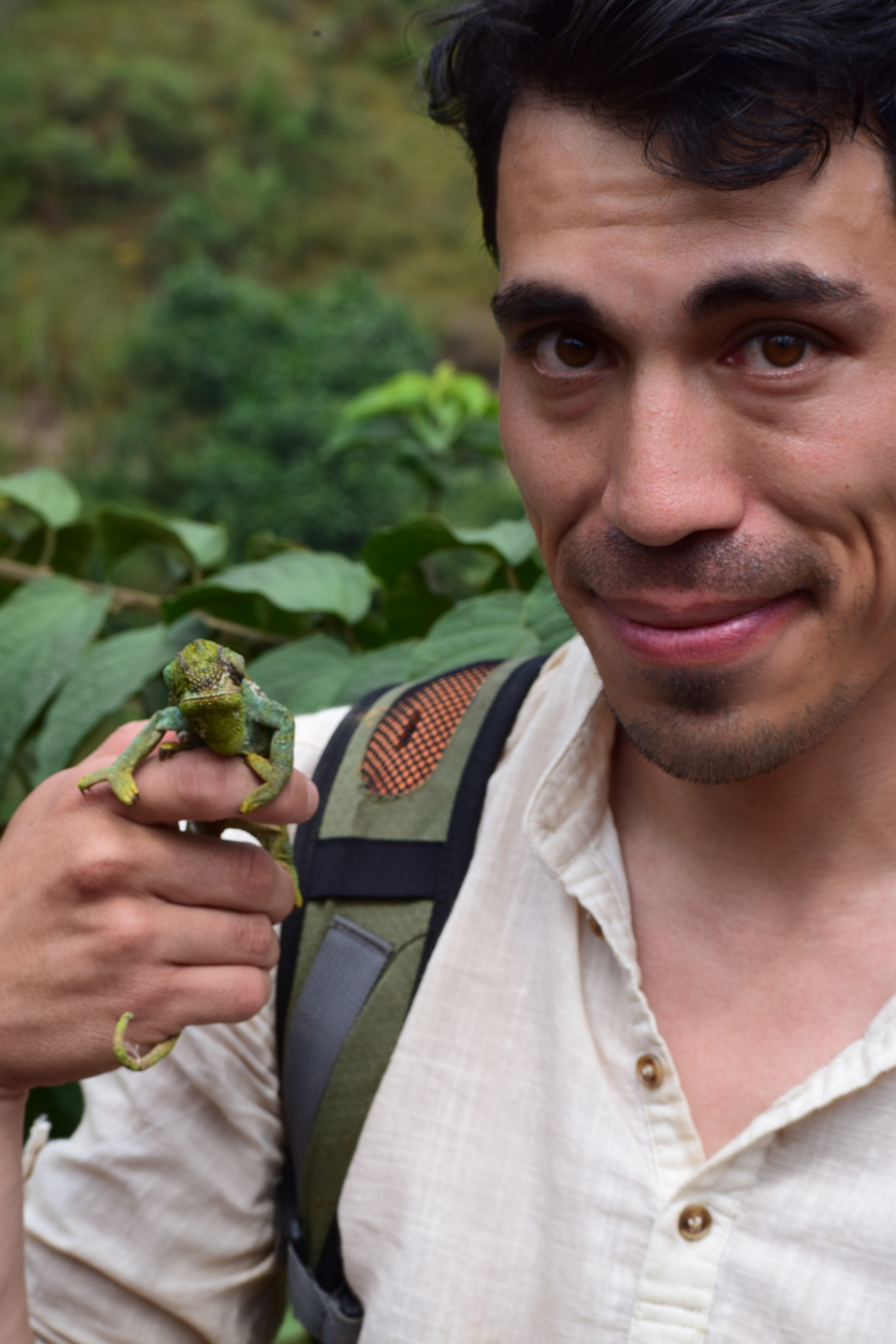
- Born: Salt Lake City, Utah
- Known for: Phage Therapy
- Scientific career
- Workplaces: Yale University
- Website: www.benjaminchanphd.com

Benjamin K. Chan (Chinese: 陳家明) is a research scientist at Yale University in the department of Ecology and Evolutionary Biology. He was born in 1980 to a U.S. Asian father, an engineer, and an American mother. He is known for his work in phage therapy exploiting genetic trade-offs to treat antibiotic resistant bacterial infections. He currently lives in Guilford, Connecticut.

== Phage therapy ==
In January 2016, Chan treated an antibiotic resistant infection of a Dacron aortic graft caused by the superbug Pseudomonas aeruginosa, this treatment reinvigorated phage therapy in Western medicine. Following this successful treatment, a second case of superbug infection was treated by Chan and others at Texas Tech University Health Sciences Center. This case involved use of nebulized phage to treat a multidrug resistant lung infection in Paige Rogers, a woman with cystic fibrosis and the research involved was featured in the Netflix series, "Follow This." He has since been featured in documentaries produced by Vice, Freethink, and BBC One. Following the publication of his first two cases, Chan and others have since treated multiple infections at Yale New Haven Hospital successfully.
