= Phage ecology =

Interaction of bacteriophages with their environments

Bacteriophages (phages), potentially the most numerous "organisms" on Earth, are the viruses of bacteria (more generally, of prokaryotes). Phage ecology is the study of the interaction of bacteriophages with their environments.

== Introduction to phage ecology ==
=== Vastness of phage ecology ===
Phages are obligate intracellular parasites meaning that they are able to reproduce only while infecting bacteria. Phages therefore are found only within environments that contain bacteria. Most environments contain bacteria, including our own bodies (called normal flora). Often these bacteria are found in large numbers. As a consequence, phages are found almost everywhere.

As a rule of thumb, many phage biologists expect that phage population densities will exceed bacterial densities by a ratio of 10-to-1 or more (VBR or virus-to-bacterium ratio; see for a summary of actual data). As there exist estimates of bacterial numbers on Earth of approximately 10^{30}, there consequently is an expectation that 10^{31} or more individual virus (mostly phage) particles exist , making phages the most numerous category of "organisms" on our planet.

Bacteria (along with archaea) appear to be highly diverse and there possibly are millions of species. Phage-ecological interactions therefore are quantitatively vast: huge numbers of interactions. Phage-ecological interactions are also qualitatively diverse: There are huge numbers of environment types, bacterial-host types, and also individual phage types

=== Studying phage ecology ===
The study of phage ecology reflects established scientific disciplines in ecological studies in scope, the most obvious being general ecology. Accordingly, phage ecology is treated under the following heads— "organismal" ecology, population ecology, community ecology, and ecosystem ecology. Phage ecology also may be considered (though mostly less well formally explored) from perspectives of phage behavioral ecology, evolutionary ecology, functional ecology, landscape ecology, mathematical ecology, molecular ecology, physiological ecology (or ecophysiology), and spatial ecology. Phage ecology additionally draws (extensively) from microbiology, particularly in terms of environmental microbiology, but also from an enormous catalog (90 years) of study of phage and phage-bacterial interactions in terms of their physiology and, especially, their molecular biology.

== Phage "organismal" ecology ==
Phage "organismal" ecology is primarily the study of the evolutionary ecological impact of phage growth parameters:

- latent period, plus
  - eclipse period (or simply "eclipse")
  - rise period (or simply "rise")
- burst size, plus
  - rate of intracellular phage-progeny maturation
- adsorption constant, plus
  - rates of virion diffusion
  - virion decay (inactivation) rates
- host range, plus
  - resistance to restriction
  - resistance to abortive infection
- various temperate-phage properties, including
  - rates of reduction to lysogeny
  - rates of lysogen induction
- the tendency of at least some phage to enter into (and then subsequently leave) a not very well understood state known (inconsistently) as pseudolysogeny

Another way of envisioning phage "organismal" ecology is that it is the study of phage adaptations that contribute to phage survival and transmission to new hosts or environments. Phage "organismal" ecology is the most closely aligned of phage ecology disciplines with the classical molecular and molecular genetic analyses of bacteriophages.

From the perspective of ecological subdisciplines, we can also consider phage behavioral ecology, functional ecology, and physiological ecology under the heading of phage "organismal" ecology. However, as noted, these subdisciplines are not as well developed as more general considerations of phage "organismal" ecology. Phage growth parameters often evolve over the course of phage experimental adaptation studies.

=== Historical overview ===
In the mid 1910s, when phage were first discovered, the concept of phage was very much a whole-culture phenomenon (like much of microbiology), where various types of bacterial cultures (on solid media, in broth) were visibly cleared by phage action. Though from the start there was some sense, especially by Fėlix d'Hėrelle, that phage consisted of individual "organisms", in fact it wasn't until the late 1930s through the 1940s that phages were studied, with rigor, as individuals, e.g., by electron microscopy and single-step growth experiments. Note, though, that for practical reasons much of "organismal" phage study is of their properties in bulk culture (many phage) rather than the properties of individual phage virions or individual infections.

This somewhat whole-organismal view of phage biology saw its heyday during the 1940s and 1950s, before giving way to much more biochemical, molecular genetic, and molecular biological analyses of phages, as seen during the 1960s and onward. This shift, paralleled in much of the rest of microbiology , represented a retreat from a much more ecological view of phages (first as bacterial killers, and then as organisms unto themselves). However, the organismal view of phage biology lives on as a foundation of phage ecological understanding. Indeed, it represents a key thread that ties together the ecological thinking on phage ecology with the more "modern" considerations of phage as molecular model systems.

=== Methods ===
The basic experimental toolkit of phage "organismal" ecology consists of the single-step growth (or one-step growth;) experiment and the phage adsorption curve. Single-step growth is a means of determining the phage latent period (example), which is approximately equivalent (depending on how it is defined) to the phage period of infection. Single-step growth experiments also are employed to determine a phage's burst size, which is the number of phage (on average) that are produced per phage-infected bacterium.

The adsorption curve is obtained by measuring the rate at which phage virion particles (see Virion#Structure) attach to bacteria. This is usually done by separating free phage from phage-infected bacteria in some manner so that either the loss of not currently infecting (free) phage or the gain of infected bacteria may be measured over time.

== Phage population ecology ==
A population is a group of individuals which either do or can interbreed or, if incapable of interbreeding, then are recently derived from a single individual (a clonal population). Population ecology considers characteristics that are apparent in populations of individuals but either are not apparent or are much less apparent among individuals. These characteristics include so-called intraspecific interactions, that is between individuals making up the same population, and can include competition as well as cooperation. Competition can be either in terms of rates of population growth (as seen especially at lower population densities in resource-rich environments) or in terms of retention of population sizes (seen especially at higher population densities where individuals are directly competing over limited resources). Respectively, these are population-density independent and dependent effects.

Phage population ecology considers issues of rates of phage population growth, but also phage-phage interactions as can occur when two or more phage adsorb an individual bacterium.

== Phage community ecology ==
A community consists of all of the biological individuals found within a given environment (more formally, within an ecosystem), particularly when more than one species is present. Community ecology studies those characteristics of communities that either are not apparent or which are much less apparent if a community consists of only a single population. Community ecology thus deals with interspecific interactions. Interspecific interactions, like intraspecific interactions, can range from cooperative to competitive but also to quite antagonistic (as are seen, for example, with predator-prey interactions). An important consequence of these interactions is coevolution.

=== Relationship with bacteria ===
The interaction of phage with bacteria is the primary concern of phage community ecologists. Bacteria have developed mechanisms that prevent phages from having an effect on them, which has led to this evolutionary arms race between the phages and their host bacteria. Bacterial resistance to phages puts pressure on the phages to develop stronger effects on the bacteria. The Red Queen hypothesis describes this relationship, as the organisms must constantly adapt and evolve in order to survive. This relationship is important to understand as phages are now being used for more practical and medicinal purposes.

Bacteria have developed multiple defense mechanisms to fight off the effects of bacteriophages. In experimentation, amount of resistance can be determined by how much of a plate (generally agar with bacteria, infected with phages) ends up being clear. The clearer, the less resistant as more bacteria have been lysed. The most common of these defense mechanisms is called the restriction-modification system (RM system). In this system, foreign DNA trying to enter the bacterial host is restricted by endonucleases that recognize specific base pairs within the DNA, while the DNA of the cell is protected from restriction due to methylase. RM systems have evolved to keep up with the ever-changing bacteria and phage. In general, these RM types differ in the nucleotide sequences that they recognize. However, there is an occasional slip where the endonuclease misses the DNA sequence of the phage and the phage DNA is able to enter the cell anyway, becoming methylated and protected against the endonuclease. This accident is what can spur the evolution of the RM system. Phages can acquire or use the enzyme from the host cell to protect their own DNA, or sometimes they will have proteins that dismantle the enzyme that is meant to restrict the phage DNA. Another option is for the phage to insert different base pairs into its DNA, thereby confusing the enzyme.

Another mechanism employed by bacteria is referred to as CRISPR. This stands for “clustered regularly interspersed palindromic repeats” which means that the immunity to phages by bacteria has been acquired via adding spacers of DNA that are identical to that of the DNA from the phage. Some phages have been found to be immune to this mechanism as well. In some way or another, the phages have managed to get rid of the sequence that would be replicated.

A third way that bacteria have managed to escape the effects of bacteriophages is by abortive infection. This is a last resort option- when the host cell has already been infected by the phage. This method is not ideal for the host cell, as it still leads to its death. The redeeming feature of this mechanism is the fact that it interferes with the phage processes and prevents it from then moving on to infect other cells.

On top of the above mentioned strategies, a growing arsenal of anti-phage immune systems has been described and quantified in bacteria.

Phages are also capable of interacting with species other than bacteria, e.g., such as phage-encoded exotoxin interaction with animals. Phage therapy is an example of applied phage community ecology.

== Phage ecosystem ecology ==
An ecosystem consists of both the biotic and abiotic components of an environment. Abiotic entities are not alive and so an ecosystem essentially is a community combined with the non-living environment within which that ecosystem exists. Ecosystem ecology naturally differs from community ecology in terms of the impact of the community on these abiotic entities, and vice versa. In practice, the portion of the abiotic environment of most concern to ecosystem ecologists is inorganic nutrients and energy.

Phages impact the movement of nutrients and energy within ecosystems primarily by lysing bacteria. Phages can also impact abiotic factors via the encoding of exotoxins (a subset of which are capable of solubilizing the biological tissues of living animals ). Phage ecosystem ecologists are primarily concerned with the phage impact on the global carbon cycle, especially within the context of a phenomenon known as the microbial loop.
