= Józef Juraszek Ślopek =

Polish doctor (1824-1907)

- Born: 10 March 1824; Poland
- Died: 24 April 1907 (aged 83)

Józef Juraszek Ślopek (10 March 1824 – 24 April 1907) was a Polish medical doctor who lived in Jeleśnia. He was a pioneer in setting broken, sprained and dislocated bones of both people and animals.

When he was 20 years old, he was drafted into the Austrian Army. At the time he was drafted, Poland was partitioned between Prussia, Russia and Austria, and the area where Ślopek lived was occupied by Austria. To avoid having to serve, he put his ring-finger on tree trunk, and with one swing of the axe, he cut it off. He then wrapped his wound with bread mixed with spider cobwebs. In accordance with the rules of the Imperial Austrian army, he was no longer obliged to join the army because he had a missing finger. In a portrait of him that hangs in the Museum, Etnograficzne w Krakowie Ethnographic Museum in Krakow, the cut-off finger is clearly evident.

When a patient was brought to him, he listened as to how the accident happened. He would then examine the wound and then skillfully set the bones in their proper location. He told his helpers to hold the patient by his hands, legs and head and then to stretch him as tight as a string, and then he even took off his shoes and used his feet in the procedure.

Ślopek undertook almost impossible surgical task with animals, especially horses, and was summoned twice to Archduke Charles Stephen of Austria in Żywiec, who was related to Emperor Franz Joseph the First. He was also summoned to the Emperor's residence in Vienna. This visit made him famous, as Franz Jozef the First had dislocated his leg in the hip when jumping from his horse. As local doctors were unable to help him, archduke Karol Stefan sent a detachment of the Emperor's army to bring Ślopek, whom he knew from before. When he arrived at the Emperor's castle, the Emperor was lying in bed, surrounded by doctors and his entourage. Though everyone was anxious to see the man and to see his method of treatment, Ślopek asked Jozef to make everybody leave the room. When all had left, he took the Emperor's leg in his hand and he skillfully set it in place. He then asked the Emperor to stand up and walk. The Emperor managed to walk, limping across the room. Ślopek remained in Vienna for 9 days until the Emperor could walk easily. During his stay, he ate the food that he had brought with him. He also food served to Emperor, which they ate together from the same dish. If the Emperor did not eat he also did not touch the food, afraid of being poisoned by jealous doctors. On Ślopek's departure the Emperor gave him a big banquet in his honor. For his services the Emperor gave him permission to treat people and animals in Galicia (the southern part of Poland under Austrian rule). He also gave him some money and a section of forest in Sopotnia Mala.

He died on 24 April 1907 and is buried in the church cemetery in Jeleśnia.
