= Drug Master File =

Document in the pharmaceutical industry

Drug Master File or DMF is a document prepared by a pharmaceutical manufacturer and submitted solely at its discretion to the appropriate regulatory authority in the intended drug market. There is no regulatory requirement to file a DMF. However, the document provides the regulatory authority with confidential, detailed information about facilities, processes, or articles used in the manufacturing, processing, packaging, and storing of one or more human drugs. Typically, a DMF is filed when two or more firms work in partnership on developing or manufacturing a drug product. The DMF filing allows a firm to protect its intellectual property from its partner while complying with regulatory requirements for disclosure of processing details.

== Description ==
Drug Master File (DMF) is a document containing complete information on an Active Pharmaceutical Ingredient (API) or finished drug dosage form. It is known as European Drug Master File (EDMF) or Active Substance Master File (ASMF) and US-Drug Master file (US-DMF) in Europe and United States respectively.

== DMFs in the United States ==
In the United States, DMFs are submitted to the Food and Drug Administration (FDA). The Main Objective of the DMF is to support regulatory requirements and to prove the quality, safety and efficacy of the medicinal product for obtaining an Investigational New Drug Application (IND), a New Drug Application (NDA), As an Abbreviated New Drug Application (ANDA), another DMF, or an Export Application.

In United States there are 5 types of Drug Master file:

- Type I Manufacturing Site, Facilities, Operating Procedures and Personnel

- Type II Drug Substance, Drug Substance Intermediate, and Material Used in Their Preparation, or Drug Product

- Type III Packaging Material

- Type IV Excipient, Colorant, Flavor, Essence, or Material Used in Their Preparation

- Type V FDA Accepted Reference Information

== DMFs in Europe ==
The content and the format for drug master file used in United States differs from that used in European Countries to obtain market authorization (MA). The Main Objective of the EDMF is to support regulatory requirements of a medicinal product to prove its quality, safety and efficacy. This helps to obtain a Marketing Authorisation grant.
