= Olympic (soil) =

The Olympic soil series is a type of deep, dark reddish brown, moderately fine-textured soil that has developed on mafic rock such as basalt. The series covers large areas in southwestern Washington and western Oregon, and usually supports forests of Douglas-fir, red alder, western redcedar, western hemlock, and bigleaf maple.

== Distribution and climate ==
Olympic soils are characteristic soils of the Olympic National Forest and the Olympic National Park of Western Oregon and Washington. They are found on stable summits of foothills and mountains from 200 to 2000 feet above sea level on slopes up to 65%.

These soils associated with marine-type climates that have cool dry summers and mild wet winters. Average annual precipitation is 40 to 70 inches. Mean January temperature is about 38 degrees F, mean July temperature is about 65 degrees F, average annual temperature is about 52 degrees F.

== Description and formation ==
Olympic soils formed in residuum and colluvium weathered from basic igneous rocks. Diagnostic horizons and features recognized in this pedon are an umbric epipedon from the surface to 13 inches and an argillic horizon from 13 to 100 inches. Base saturation is less than 35 percent to 1.8 meters.

The solum thickness ranges from 60 to more than 100 inches. The particle size averages 15 to 25 percent course sand and 35 to 60 percent clay. Texture is clay loam, silty clay loam, silty clay, or clay. The ratio of calcium to magnesium is 2 to 4.

The average annual soil temperature at a depth of 20 inches ranges from 47 to 54 degrees F. Olympic soils are usually moist but dry in all parts between depths of 4 and 12 inches for 45 to 60 consecutive days within the three months following the summer solstice.

=== Soil horizons ===
Olympic soils have a relatively shallow and slightly cemented topsoil followed by five defining Bt horizons. A Bt horizon contains an illuvial layer of lattice clays. It forms below an eluvial horizon. The Bt horizon can lay exposed where surface soil layers have been removed during erosion. The Bt usually has a high ratio of fine clay to total clay:

A horizon: The topsoil layer is dark brown, silty clay loam with fine subangular blocky and moderate fine granular structure. It is hard, friable, slightly sticky, and plastic, with many roots and very fine irregular pores. The layer is slightly acidic (pH 6.2) and is about 4 to 7 inches thick.

ABc horizon: The second layer is dark reddish-brown silty clay loam with a similar structure to the A horizon but with 5% concretions and moderately acid (pH 5.8).

Bt1 horizon - The third layer is dark reddish-brown silty clay loam, with moderate medium fine and very fine subangular blocky structure, 2% concretions, and moderately acid (pH 5.8).

Bt2 horizon: The fourth layer is yellowish-red silty clay with a moderate coarse subangular blocky structure that parts to medium fine subangular blocky. It has many faint and distinct clay films on faces of peds and in pores and is moderately acidic (pH 5.8).

Bt3 horizon: The fifth layer is yellowish-red clay, with moderate medium and fine subangular blocky structure, many faint and distinct clay films, and moderately acidic (pH 5.6).

Bt4 horizon: The sixth layer is yellowish-red clay, with moderate medium and fine subangular and angular blocky structure and 7% concretions. It is strongly acidic (pH 5.3).

Bt5 horizon: The seventh layer is yellowish-red rubbed, dark red, and reddish-brown clay with a moderately coarse and very coarse angular blocky structure that parts to medium and fine subangular angular blocky structure. It is very strongly acidic (pH 5.0).

Cr horizon: The final layer is strongly weathered basalt and very strongly acidic (pH 4.8).

== Use and management ==
Olympic soils are mostly found in forest environments. Native vegetation includes douglas-fir, red alder, western hemlock, western redcedar, and bigleaf maple and an understory of salal, vine maple, western swordfern, Oregon-grape, western brackenfern, red huckleberry, trailing blackberry and Pacific trillium.

They are fertile soils that are typically used for forestry and to a lesser extent grazing. The high clay content in the Bt horizon of these soils means that they are susceptible to compaction. Therefore, care must be taken when conducting these activities.

== In other classification systems ==
Olympic soils are a series of soils in the USDA Soil Taxonomy system. They were previously classified as clayey, mixed, mesic Xeric Haplohumults. They share many similarities to Alfisols. In the Canadian System of Soil Classification, they are most similar to Luvisols due to the prolific Bt horizon.
