= Plinthosol =

Iron-rich soil type

Plinthosols
- Groundwater Laterite, Plinthaquox (USDA)
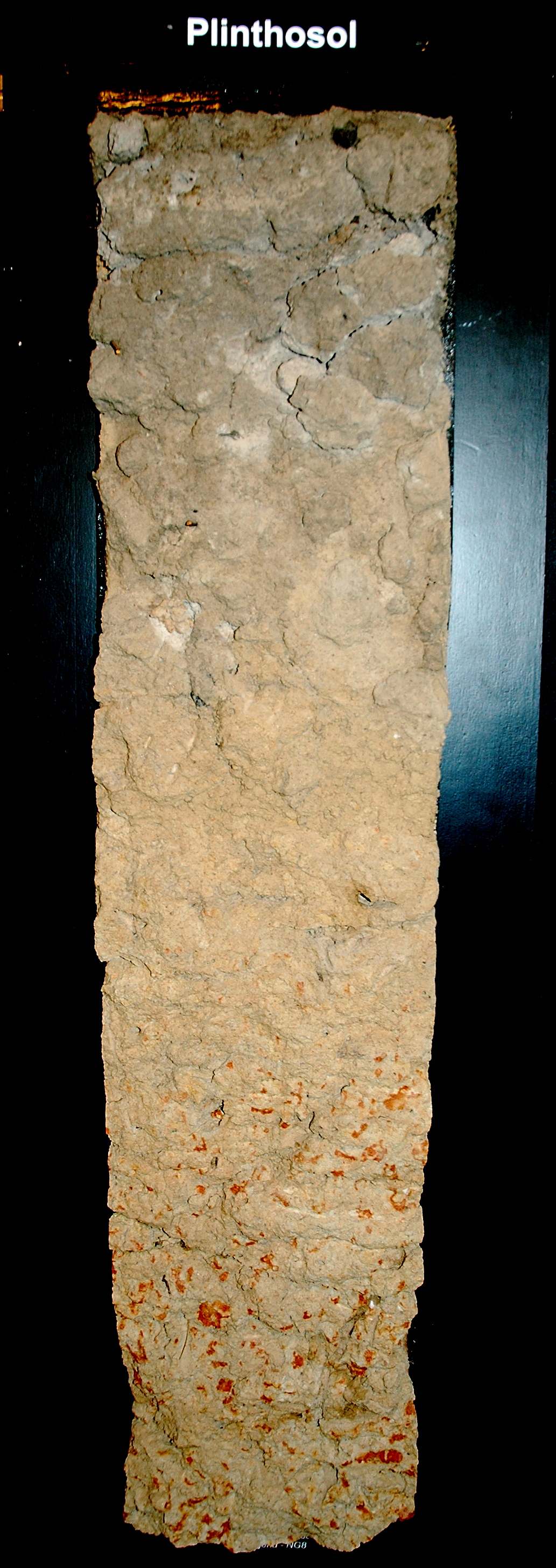
- Used in: WRB
- WRB code: PT
- Key process: Accumulation of Fe under hydromorphic conditions
- Parent material: basic rock, Fe
- Climate: wet tropics

Plinthosols are a reference soil group in the World Reference Base for Soil Resources (WRB), developed by the Food and Agriculture Organization (FAO). They are characterized by the presence of plinthite, petroplinthite, or pisoliths—concretions formed through pedogenic processes involving the accumulation of iron oxides. A key diagnostic feature of these soils is the plinthic horizon, which begins within 50 cm of the soil surface, or 100 cm if it lies beneath an albic horizon or a horizon with stagnic properties. Plinthosols typically form in tropical environments with alternating wet and dry conditions, where fluctuating water tables promote the transformation of iron and clay minerals. Plinthite, a red, clay-rich material, hardens irreversibly into ironstone when exposed to repeated moisture cycles. Though it may resemble a mineral when hardened, plinthite is a soil-forming (pedogenic) material rather than a true mineral.

Two main processes contribute to plinthite development. First, iron and aluminum accumulate through removing silica and base cations by hydrolysis and leaching, resulting in quartz–kaolinite mineral assemblage or through enrichment from external sources. Second, alternating reduction and oxidation cycles lead to iron segregation within the soil. Under saturated conditions, iron is reduced and becomes mobile in its ferrous form. Upon drying, it oxidizes and precipitates as ferric oxides and hydroxides. Over time, repeated wetting and drying cause these iron compounds to accumulate in mottled patterns, often appearing as platy, polygonal, or reticulate structures. This segregation and accumulation of iron are central to the development of plinthite and, ultimately, to the formation of Plinthosols

== Characteristics of Plinthosols ==
=== Morphological Characteristics ===
Differentiating plinthite from typical mottled clay or ironstone gravel can be challenging, as these materials often transition gradually into one another. In the field, plinthite is recognized by several key features: the red mottles are notably firm or very firm when moist and become hard or very hard upon drying. They can be cut with a knife, but not easily. Plinthite has well-defined boundaries, does not readily stain the fingers when rubbed, and does not disintegrate or slake in water.

=== Mineralogical Characteristics ===
Plinthite and petroplinthite are rich in hydrated iron and aluminium oxides, with iron oxide content occasionally exceeding 80%, though some units may contain about equal parts of each. Iron is primarily present in the form of oxide minerals such as lepidocrocite (FeOOH), goethite (FeOOH), and hematite (Fe_{2}O_{3}), while aluminium occurs as gibbsite (Al_{2}O_{3}·3H_{2}O) and/or boehmite (Al_{2}O_{3}·H_{2}O). Older ironstone crusts generally contain more hematite and boehmite than plinthite but lower overall sesquioxide content. Quartz is often found as inherited silica from the parent material, while easily weathered primary minerals are typically absent. The dominant clay mineral is well-crystallized kaolinite.

=== Hydrological Characteristics ===
Plinthosols containing soft plinthite are typically found in bottomlands of regions where annual precipitation exceeds evaporation. These soils often show signs of eluviation, including an albic horizon beneath an umbric surface layer. Due to poor drainage, such soils frequently develop gleyic or stagnic properties.

== Management Use ==
Plinthosols pose significant challenges for land management. Their natural fertility is low, and they are prone to waterlogging in bottomlands and drought in shallow or skeletal areas. In many regions outside the wet tropics, shallow petroplinthite restricts root growth, making the land unsuitable for conventional agriculture; such areas are often relegated to low-intensity grazing. Stoniness is another limiting factor, particularly in Skeletic Plinthosols with high pisolith content (up to 80%). Despite these constraints, some are still used for cultivating food and tree crops, such as cocoa in West Africa or cashew in India, though yields may be affected by seasonal drought.

== Geographical Distribution ==
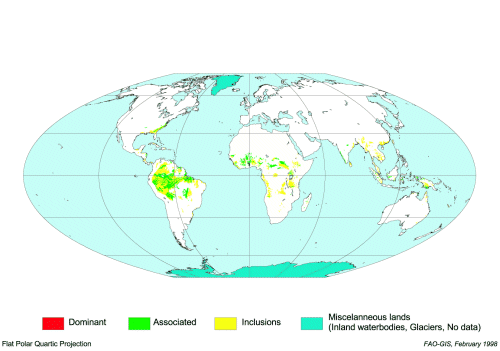
Regional Distribution of Plinthosols

These soils commonly occur in moist tropical regions, especially in low-lying landscapes such as valley bottoms, foot slopes, and drainage plains. They are typically found where iron from surrounding upland soils accumulates due to lateral and vertical water movement. Soils containing plinthite are estimated to cover around 60 million hectares globally. Soft plinthite is most commonly found in humid tropical regions, particularly in the eastern Amazon Basin, the central Congo Basin, and parts of Southeast Asia. In drier tropical zones, such as the Sudano-Sahelian region, hardened plinthite (petroplinthite) forms extensive surface caps on exposed or elevated landforms. Similar soils are also present in the Indian subcontinent, northern Australia, and drier areas of Southeast Asia.

== See also ==
- Laterite – Product of rock weathering in wet tropical climates rich in iron and aluminium
