= Canadian system of soil classification =

The Canadian System of Soil Classification is more closely related to the American system than any other, but they differ in several ways. The Canadian system is designed to cover only Canadian soils. The Canadian system dispenses with the sub-order hierarchical level. Solonetzic and Gleysolic soils are differentiated at the order level.

== History ==
Before 1955, Canadian soil testing was based on systems of classification which were similar to methods being used in the United States. In 1955, a taxonomic system of soil classification specific to Canadian conditions was introduced. This system was designed to differentiate soils created by pedogenic processes in cool climatic environments.

== Classification process ==
The land area of Canada (excluding inland waters) is approximately 9,180,000 km^{2} (3,540,000 sq mi), of which about 1,375,000 km^{2} (531,000 sq mi) (15%) is rock land. The remainder is classified according to the Canadian System of Soil Classification. This system differentiates soil types on the basis of measured properties of the profile and uses a hierarchical scheme to classify soils from general to specific. The most recent version of the classification system has five categories in its hierarchical structure. From general to specific, the major categories in this system are: Orders, Great Groups, Subgroups, Families, and Series.

Soil classes are defined as specifically as possible to permit uniformity of classification. Limits between classes are arbitrary as there are few sharp divisions of the soil continuum in nature. Differences in soils are the result of the interaction of many factors: climate, organisms, parent material, relief and time. The soil classification system changes as knowledge grows through soil mapping and research in Canada and elsewhere.

Classification involves arranging individual units with similar characteristics into groups. Soils do not occur as discrete entities; thus the unit of measurement for soil is not obvious. This unit of measurement is called the pedon, defined as a 3-dimensional body, commonly with lateral dimensions of 1 metre and depth of 1 to 2 metres. A vertical section of a pedon displays the more-or-less horizontal layers (horizons) developed by the action of soil-forming processes. Soil classification facilitates the organization and communication of information about soils, as well as the understanding of relationships between soils and environmental factors. At its most general level, the Canadian System recognizes ten different Soil Orders.

To classify in a soil in practice, an identification key in The Canadian System of Soil Classification is used. Decisions are made based on the properties of the horizons, such as thickness, Munsell colour, pH, or evidence of other soil-forming processes (eg, eluviation).

== Orders ==
=== Cryosolic Order ===
These soils have permafrost (permanently frozen material) within one metre of the surface (2 m if the soil is strongly cryoturbated; i.e., disturbed by frost action). As permafrost is a barrier to roots and water, the active layer (seasonally thawed material) above it may become a saturated, semifluid material in spring. Commonly the permafrost layer near the surface contains abundant ice. Melting of ice and frozen materials, resulting from disturbance of the surface vegetation (boreal forest or tundra), may cause slumping of the soil and disruption of roads, pipelines and buildings. Cryosolic soils, occupying about 3,672,000 km^{2} (about 40%) of Canada's land area, are dominant in much of the Yukon, Northwest Territories and Nunavut and occur in northern areas of all but the Atlantic provinces (excluding Labrador).

The order and its three great groups were defined in 1973, after soil and terrain surveys in the Mackenzie Valley yielded new knowledge about the properties, genesis and significance of these soils. Turbic Cryosols have a patterned surface (hummocks, stone nets, etc.) and mixed horizons or other evidence of cryoturbation. Static Cryosols lack marked evidence of cryoturbation; they are associated with sandy or gravelly materials. Organic Cryosols are composed dominantly of organic materials (e.g., peat). Because organic material acts as an insulator, Organic Cryosols occur farther south than the boundary of continuous permafrost.

=== Organic Order ===
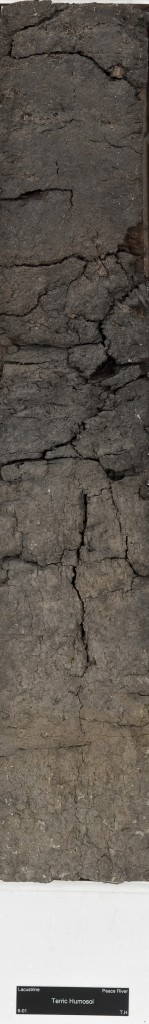
Organic soil monolith

These soils are composed predominantly of organic matter in the upper half metre (more than 30% organic matter by weight) and do not have permafrost near the surface. They are the major soils of peatlands (e.g., swamp, bog, fen). Most organic soils develop by the accumulation of plant materials from species that grow well in areas usually saturated with water. Some organic soils are composed largely of plant materials deposited in lakes; others, mainly of forest leaf litter on rocky slopes in areas of high rainfall. Organic soils cover almost 374,000 km^{2} (4.1%) of Canada's land area: large areas occur in Manitoba, Ontario and northern Alberta, smaller areas in other provinces and territories.

Organic soils are subdivided into four great groups.

Fibrisols
common in Canada, consist predominantly of relatively undecomposed organic material with clearly visible plant fragments; resistant fibres account for over 40% by volume. Most soils derived from Sphagnum mosses are Fibrisols.
Mesisols
are more highly decomposed and contain less fibrous material than Fibrisols (10–40% by volume).
Humisols
consist mainly of humified organic materials and may contain up to 10% fibre by volume.
Folisols
consist mainly of thick deposits of forest litter overlying bedrock, fractured bedrock or unconsolidated material. They occur commonly in wet mountainous areas of coastal British Columbia.

=== Vertisolic Order ===
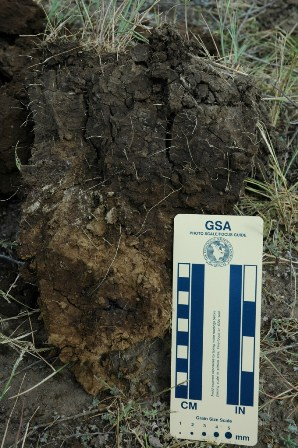
Vertisol profile

These clay-rich soils shrink and swell markedly on drying and wetting. The physical disruption associated with shrinking and swelling produces shiny shear planes (slickensides) in the subsoil and either prevents the formation of subsurface horizons or severely disrupts and mixes them. When the soil swells on wetting, the former surficial material is mixed with the subsoil. Vertisolic soils develop mainly in clayey materials in semiarid to subhumid areas of the Interior Plains of Saskatchewan, Manitoba and Alberta and occupy less than 1% of the land area of Canada.

The order and its two great groups were recognized in the Canadian system in the 1990s after extensive studies of pedons in the Great Plains. The Vertisol great group has a light-coloured A horizon that is not readily distinguishable, and the Humic Vertisol great group has a dark-coloured A horizon enriched in organic matter that is clearly distinguishable from the underlying soil material.

=== Podzolic Order ===
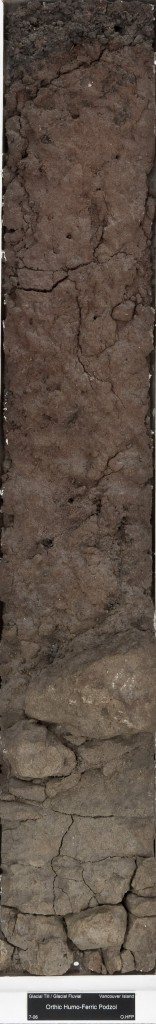
Podzol soil monolith with inconspicuous eluviation; coarse granular structure of top mineral horizon (Ahe or Ap) is evidence of earthworm invasion.

These acid soils have a B horizon containing accumulations of amorphous materials composed of humified organic matter associated with aluminum and iron. They develop most commonly in sandy materials in areas of cold, humid climate under forest or shrub vegetation. Water moving downward through the relatively porous material leaches out basic elements (e.g., calcium), and acidic conditions develop. Soluble organic substances formed by decomposition of the forest litter attack soil minerals in surface horizons, and much of the iron and aluminum released combines with this organic material. When the proportion of aluminum and iron to organic matter reaches a critical level, the organic complex becomes insoluble and is deposited in the B horizon. Dissolved aluminum and iron may also move downward in inorganic forms and be deposited as aluminum-silicon complexes and iron oxides. An eluvial Ae (light grey, strongly leached) horizon usually is prominent above the Podzolic B horizon, but may be inconspicuous or absent.

Podzolic soils occupy 14.3% of the Canadian landmass, and occur in two widely separated areas, the Appalachian Uplands and Canadian Shield in the east, and British Columbia in the west, usually under coniferous forest and on non-calcareous parent material. They are divided among three great groups on the basis of the kind of Podzolic B horizon. Humic Podzols have a dark B horizon with a low iron content. They occur mainly in wet sites under humid climates and are much less common than other Podzolic soils.

Ferro-Humic Podzols have a dark reddish-brown or black B horizon containing at least 5% organic carbon and appreciable amounts (often 2% or more) of aluminum and iron in organic complexes. They occur commonly in the more humid parts of the area of Podzolic soils; e.g., coastal British Columbia and parts of Newfoundland and southern Quebec. In Labrador along the Churchill River valley Ferro-Humic Podzols comprise about 36% of soils. Humo-Ferric Podzols, the most common Podzolic soils in Canada, have a reddish-brown B horizon containing less than 5% organic carbon associated with aluminum and iron complexes.

=== Gleysolic Order ===
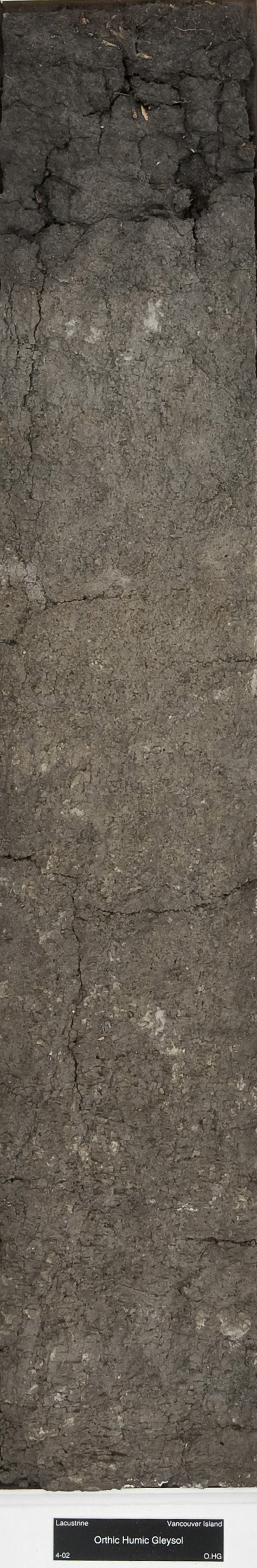
Gleysol soil monolith

These soils are periodically or permanently saturated with water and depleted of oxygen. They occur commonly in shallow depressions and level areas of subhumid and humid climate in association with other classes of soil on slopes and hills. After snowmelt or heavy rains, depressions in the landscape may be flooded. If flooding occurs when the soil temperature is above approximately 5 °C, microbial activity results in depletion of oxygen within a few days. Under such conditions, oxidized soil components (e.g., nitrate, ferric oxide) are reduced. Depletion of ferric oxide removes the brownish colour common to many soils, leaving them grey. As the soil dries and oxygen re-enters, the reduced iron may be oxidized locally to bright yellow-brown spots (mottles). Thus, Gleysolic soils are usually identified by their poor drainage and drab grey colour, sometimes accompanied by brown mottles. Gleysolic soils cover about 117,000 km^{2} (1.3%) of Canada's land area.

Three great groups of Gleysolic soils are defined. Humic Gleysols have a dark A horizon enriched in organic matter. Gleysols lack such a horizon. Luvic Gleysols have a leached (Ae) horizon underlain by a B horizon in which the clay has accumulated; they may have a dark surface horizon.

=== Solonetzic Order ===
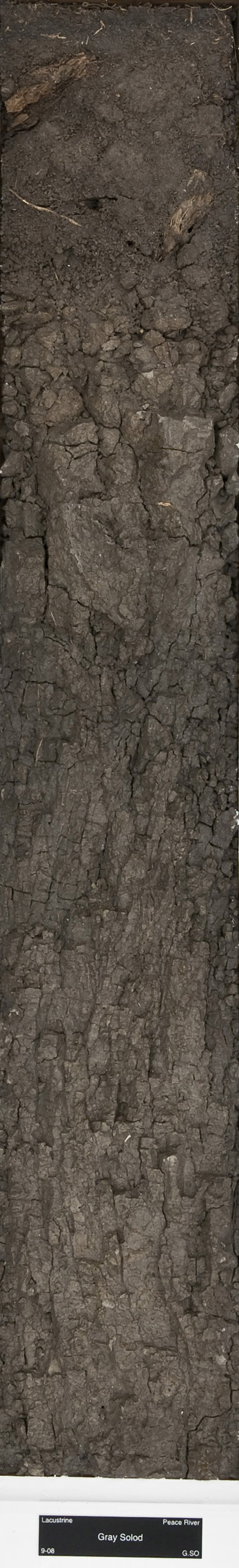
Solonetz soil monolith

These soils have B horizons that are very hard when dry, swelling to a sticky, compact mass when wet. They usually develop in saline parent materials in semiarid and subhumid regions. Properties of the B horizons are associated with sodium ions that cause the clay to disperse readily and swell on wetting, thus closing the large pores and preventing water flow. Solonetzic soils cover almost 73,000 km^{2} (0.7%) of Canada's land area; most occur in southern Alberta, because of the large areas of saline parent material and semiarid climate.

The four great groups of Solonetzic soils are based on properties reflecting the degree of leaching. Solonetz soils have a dark, organic-matter-enriched A horizon overlying the Solonetzic B, which occurs usually at a depth of 20 cm or less. The Ae (grey, leached) horizon is very thin or absent. Solodized Solonetz have a distinct Ae horizon between the dark A and the Solonetzic B. Solods have a transitional AB or BA horizon formed by degradation of the upper part of the Solonetzic B horizon. Vertisolic Solonetzic soils have features intergrading the Vertisolic order in addition to any of the above Solonetzic features. The developmental sequence of Solonetzic soils is commonly from saline parent material to Solonetz, Solodized Solonetz and Solod. As leaching progresses, the salts and sodium ions are translocated downward. If leaching progresses for long enough and salts are removed completely, the Solonetzic B may disintegrate completely. The soil would then be classified in another order. Resalinization may occur and reverse the process associated with leaching.

=== Chernozemic Order ===
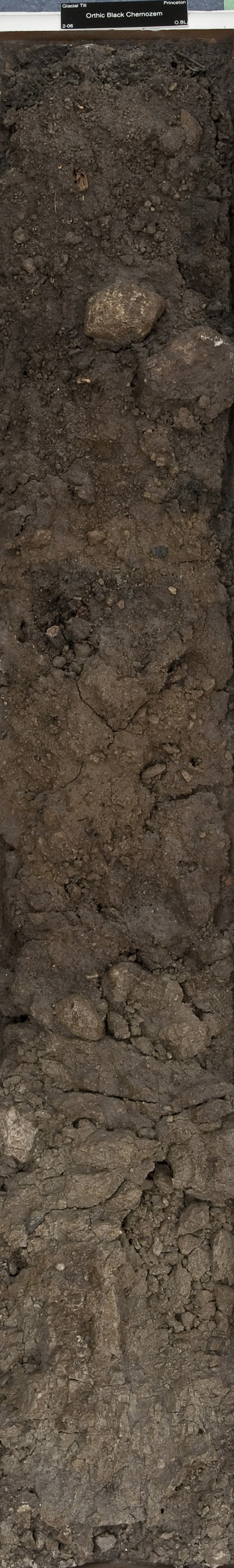
Chernozem soil monolith

These soils have an A horizon darkened by the addition of organic matter, usually from the decay of grass roots. The A horizon is neutral to slightly acid and is well supplied with bases such as calcium. The C horizon usually contains calcium carbonate (lime); it may contain more soluble salts such as gypsum. Chernozemic soils have mean annual soil temperatures above 0 °C and occur in regions of semiarid and subhumid climates. Covering more than 4% of Canada's land area, they are the major class of soils in the southern Interior Plains, where grass is the dominant native vegetation.

The four great groups of Chernozemic soils are distinguished based upon surface horizon colour, associated with the relative dryness of the soil. Brown soils have brownish A horizons and occur in the driest area of the Chernozemic region. Dark Brown soils have a darker A horizon than Brown soils, reflecting a somewhat higher precipitation and associated higher organic-matter content. Black soils, associated with subhumid climates and tall-grass native vegetation, have a black A horizon which is usually thicker than that of Brown or Dark Brown soils. Dark Gray soils are transitional between grassland Chernozemic soils and the more strongly leached soils of forested regions.

=== Luvisolic Order ===
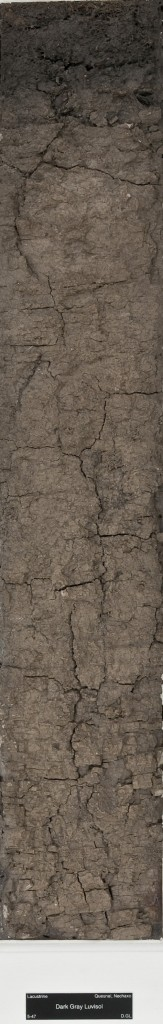
Luvisol soil monolith

These soils have eluvial horizons from which clay has been leached after snowmelt or heavy rains and illuvial horizons in which clay has been deposited; these horizons are designated Ae and Bt respectively. In saline or calcareous materials, clay translocation is preceded by leaching of salts and carbonates. Luvisolic soils occur typically in forested areas of subhumid to humid climate where the parent materials contain appreciable clay. Luvisolic soils cover about 809,000 km^{2} (8.8%) of Canada's land area. Large areas of Luvisolic soils occur in the central to northern Interior Plains; smaller areas in all regions south of the permafrost zone.

The two great groups of Luvisolic soils are distinguished mainly on the basis of soil temperature. Gray Brown Luvisols have a dark Ah horizon in which organic matter has been mixed with the mineral material (commonly by earthworm activity), a brown, often platy eluvial horizon (Ae) and an illuvial horizon (Bt) in which blocky structure is common. Their mean annual soil temperature is 8 °C or higher. The major area of Gray Brown Luvisols is found in the southern part of the Great Lakes-St Lawrence Lowlands. Gray Luvisols have eluvial and illuvial horizons and may have an Ah horizon if the mean annual soil temperature is below 8 °C. Vast areas of Gray Luvisols in the Boreal Forest Zone of the Interior Plains have thick, light grey eluvial horizons underlying the forest litter and thick Bt horizons with clay coating the surface of aggregates.

=== Brunisolic Order ===
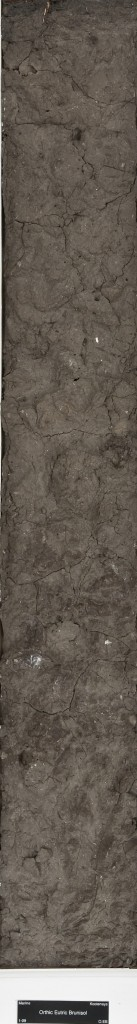
Brunisol soil monolith

This order includes all soils that have developed B horizons but do not meet the requirements of any of the orders described previously. Many Brunisolic soils have brownish B horizons without much evidence of clay accumulation, as in Luvisolic soils, or of amorphous materials, as in Podzolic soils. With time and stable environmental conditions, some Brunisolic soils will evolve to Luvisolic soils; others, to Podzolic soils. Covering almost 790,000 km^{2} (8.6%) of Canada's land area, Brunisolic soils occur in association with other soils in all regions south of the permafrost zone.

Four great groups are distinguished on the basis of organic matter enrichment in the A horizon and acidity. Melanic Brunisols have an Ah horizon at least 10 cm thick and a pH above 5.5. They occur commonly in southern Ontario and Quebec. Eutric Brunisols have the same basic properties as Melanic Brunisols, except that the Ah horizon, if any, is less than 10 cm thick. Sombric Brunisols have an Ah horizon at least 10 cm thick, and are acid and their pH is below 5.5. Dystric Brunisols are acidic and do not have an Ah horizon 10 cm thick.

All four of these great groups have eluviated subgroups in which an Ae horizon is present but the B horizon has insufficient accumulation of amorphous material or clay to classify the soil as Podzolic or Luvisolic.

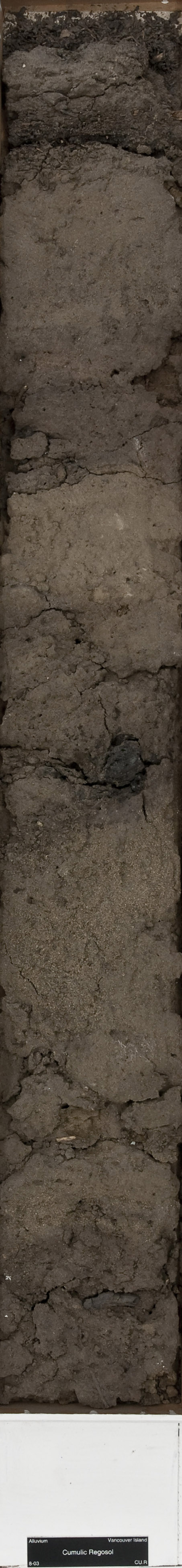
Regosol soil monolith

=== Regosolic Order ===
The term Regosol is derived from rego (from the Greek rhe¯gos meaning blanket) and sol (from Latin solum or soil). Regosolic soils cover about 0.8% of Canada's land area.

Regosolic soils are the link between the geological regolith, and the radiative forcing that work together to form a soil, stabilized by organic matter. While these soils must be able to support plant life, they have not been stable long enough to develop deeply differentiated soil horizons.

The properties of Regosolic soils are essentially those of the parent material. Two great groups are defined:

Regosols
consist essentially of C horizons.
Humic Regosols
have an Ah horizon at least 10 cm thick.

== Subgroups, families and series ==
In the Canadian System of Soil Classification, soils are organized hierarchically as:

Order → Great Group → Subgroup → Family → Series

=== Great Group ===
The 31 great group classes are formed by subdividing order classes on the basis of soil properties that reflect differences in soil-forming processes (e.g., kinds and amounts of organic matter in surface soil horizons).

=== Subgroups ===
Subgroups are based on the sequence of horizons in the pedon. Many subgroups intergrade to other soil orders. For example, the Gray Luvisol great group includes 12 subgroups; Orthic Gray Luvisol is the typical expression of Gray Luvisols, and other subgroups are intergrades to the Chernozemic order (Dark Gray Luvisol), Podzolic order (Podzolic Gray Luvisol), Gleysolic order (Gleyed Gray Luvisol), Solonetzic and Gleysolic orders (Gleyed Solonetzic Gray Luvisol), etc.

=== Families ===
Families are based on parent material properties and soil climate. For example, the Orthic Gray Luvisol subgroup includes soils of a wide range of texture (gravelly sandy loam to clay), different mineralogy and different temperature and moisture regime. The soil family designation is much more specific; e.g., Orthic Gray Luvisol, clayey, mixed (mineralogy), cold, subhumid.

=== Series ===
Series have a vast array of properties (e.g., horizon thickness and colour, gravel content, structure) that fall within a narrow range. Thus, for example, the series name Breton implies all the basic properties of the Luvisolic order, the Gray Luvisol great group, the Orthic Gray Luvisol subgroup and the fine, loamy, mixed, cold subhumid family of that subgroup as well as series-specific properties. A series name implies so much specific information about soil properties that a wide range of interpretations can be made on the probable suitability of the soil for a variety of uses.

== See also ==
- Soil classification
- World Reference Base for Soil Resources
