= Cambic horizon =

Cambic horizon (Latin: Cambiare, to change) is a diagnostic sub-surface horizon of a soil experiencing pedogenic change. Development is minimal and it is cambic if it does not meet the Taxonomic requirements to classify in another horizon.

== Properties ==
There are key characteristics that determine a layer of soils classification. Cambic horizons do not consist of appreciable illuviated material such as clay, organic carbon, iron, and aluminum oxyhydroxides, carbonate, gypsum, or soluble salts. These horizons must have a non-sandy texture and occur in poorly drained soils. The particles size must be as finer or finer than loamy fine sand or very fine sand.

== Classification ==
Cambic horizons are found most in Mollisols and Inceptisols, but can also be found in Andisols where its designation is Bw or Bg in all three. Cambic horizons are designated as Bss or Bssg in Vertisols and Bk in Cambids.

== Formation ==
Cambic horizons form through the soil forming process called pedogenesis. Influenced primarily by soil forming processes over time, it commonly forms below an albic horizon. It has less clay content than an argillic horizon but is still a visible layer. In the pedogenesis process under a chronosequence, once the soil develops into an alfisol, the Cambic horizon will develop into an argillic (Bt) horizon. They are commonly classified in floodplains.
