= Solum =

Surface and subsurface layers of soil

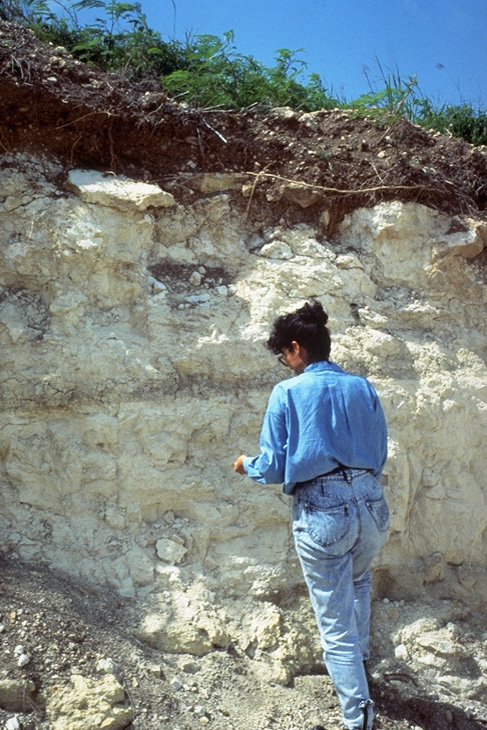
Arawak soil series. St. Croix, U.S. Virgin Islands. Solum depth is 11 inches and soil depth is 14 inches

The solum (plural, sola) in soil science consists of the surface and subsoil layers that have undergone the same soil forming conditions. The base of the solum is the relatively unweathered parent material.

Solum and soils are not synonymous. Some soils include layers that are not affected by soil formation. These layers are not part of the solum. The number of genetic horizons ranges from one to many. A surface layer that is 10 cm thick overlying bedrock can be by itself the solum. A soil that consists only of recently deposited alluvium or recently exposed soft sediment does not have a solum.

In terms of soil horizon designations, a solum consists of A, E, and B horizons and their transitional horizons and some O horizons. Included are horizons with an accumulation of carbonates or more soluble salts if they are either within, or contiguous, to other genetic horizons and are at least partly produced in the same period of soil formation. The solum of a soil presently at the surface, for example, includes all horizons now forming. The solum of a soil is not necessarily confined to the zone of major biological activity. A solum does not have a maximum or a minimum thickness.

The lower limit should relate to the depth of rooting to be expected for perennial plants assuming that soil moisture conditions and soil chemistry are not limiting. In some soils the lower limit of the solum can be set only arbitrarily and needs to be defined in relation to the particular soil. For example, horizons of carbonate accumulation are easily visualized as part of the solum in many soils in arid and semiarid environments. To conceive of hardened carbonate accumulations extending for 5 meters or more below the B horizon as part of the solum is more difficult. Gleyed soil material begins in some soils a few centimeters below the surface and continues practically unchanged to a depth of many meters. Gleying immediately below the A horizon is likely to be related to the processes of soil formation in the modern soil. At great depth, gleying is likely to be relict or related to processes that are more geological than pedological. Much the same kind of problem exists in some deeply weathered soils in which the deepest material penetrated by roots is very similar to the weathered material at much greater depth.

In Scottish law, the solum is the area of ground that lies inside the walls or foundations of a building.
