= Saprolite =

Chemically weathered rock

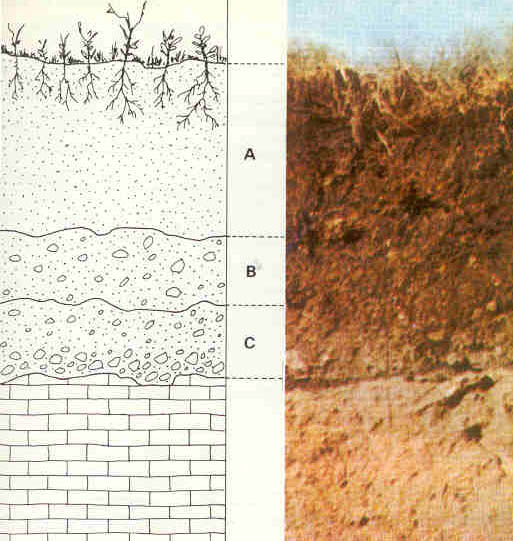
A represents soil; B represents laterite, a regolith; C represents saprolite, a less-weathered regolith; beneath C is bedrock.

Saprolite is a chemically weathered rock. Saprolites form in the lower zones of soil profiles and represent deep weathering of the bedrock surface. In most outcrops, its color comes from ferric compounds. Deeply weathered profiles are widespread on the continental landmasses between latitudes 35°N and 35°S.

Conditions for the formation of deeply weathered regolith include a topographically moderate relief flat enough to prevent erosion and to allow leaching of the products of chemical weathering. A second condition is long periods of tectonic stability; tectonic activity and climate change can cause erosion. The third condition is humid tropical to temperate climate.

Poorly weathered saprolite grit aquifers are capable of producing groundwater, often suitable for livestock. Deep weathering causes the formation of many secondary and supergene ores: bauxite, iron ores, saprolitic gold, supergene copper, uranium, and heavy minerals in residual accumulations.

== Definition, description and locations ==
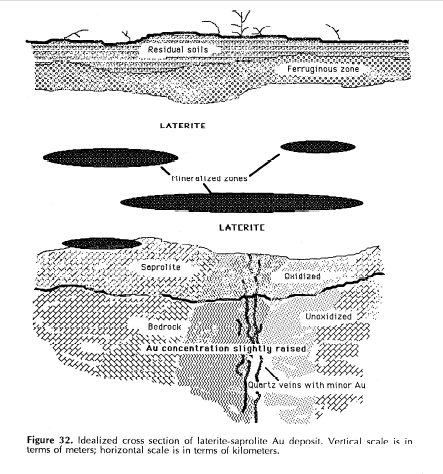
Saprolite is not as weathered as laterite; there is a continuum from the upper layer of saprolite to laterite.

Saprolite (from Greek σαπρος (sapros) = putrid + λιθος (lithos) = rock) is a chemically weathered rock (literally, it means "rotten rock"). More intense weathering results in a continuous transition from saprolite to laterite.

Saprolites form in the lower zones of soil horizons and represent deep weathering of the bedrock surface. In lateritic regoliths – regoliths are the loose layer of rocks that rest on the bedrock – saprolite may be overlain by upper horizons of residual laterite; most of the original profile is preserved by residual soils or transported overburden. Weathering formed thin kaolinitic [Al_{2}Si_{2}O_{5}(OH)_{4}] saprolites 1,000 to 500 million years ago; thick kaolinitic saprolites 200 to 66 million years ago; and medium-thick immature saprolites 5 million years ago in Sweden. The general structure of kaolinite has silicate [Si_{2}O_{5}] sheets bonded to aluminium hydroxide [Al_{2}(OH)_{4}] layers.

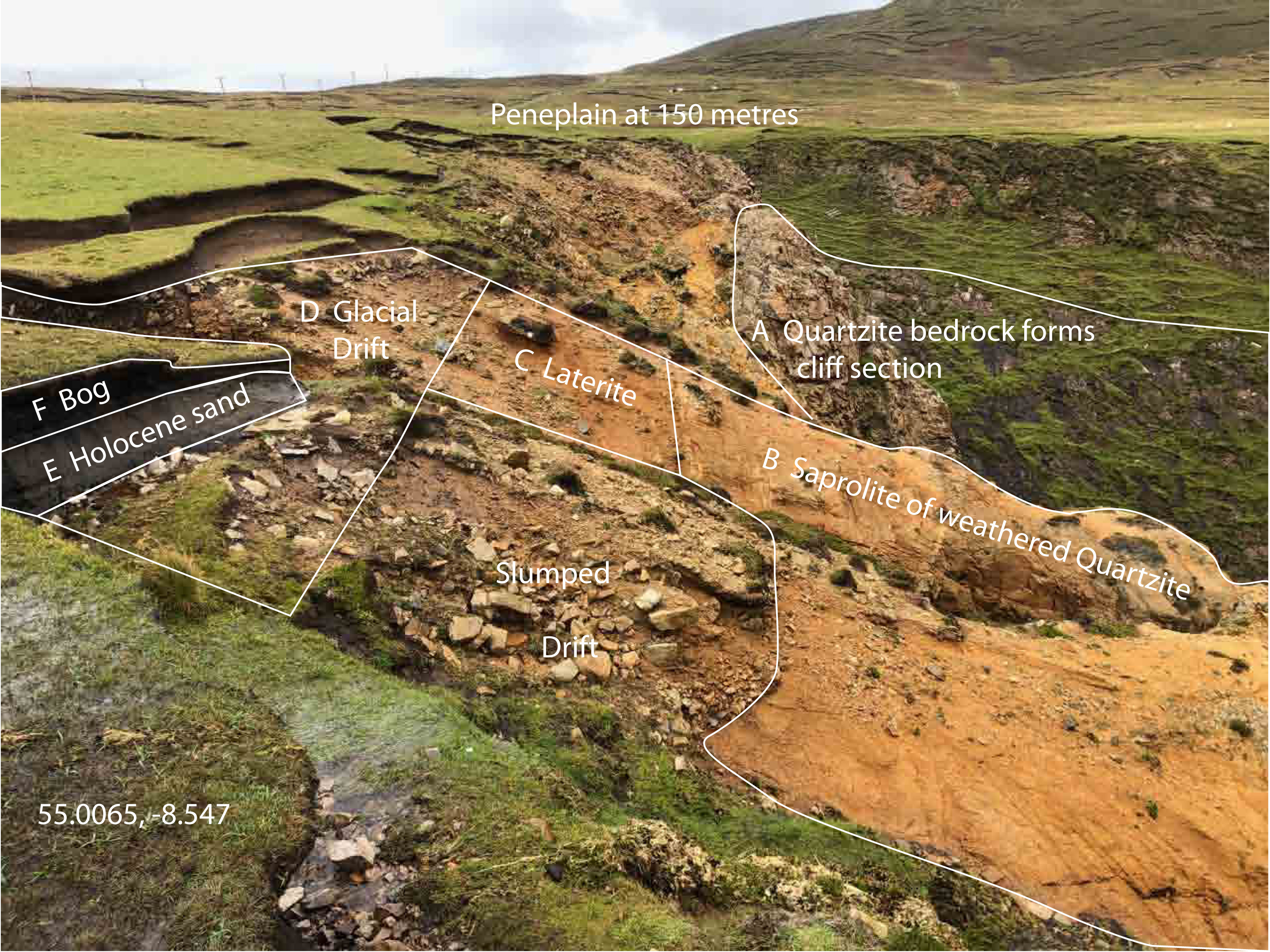
Saprolite at Arranmore (Ireland). Transition from tectonized quartzite through saprolite to laterite. The weathered section is covered by glacial drift with scattered erratics, Holocene sandy soil and thin bog.

Iron compounds are the primary coloring agents in saprolites. At most outcrops the color comes from ferric compounds; the color relates to the mineralogy and particle size. Submicron-sized goethite [FeO(OH)] is yellow; coarse goethite is brown. Sub-micron-sized hematite [Fe_{2}O_{3}] is red; coarse hematite is gray to black.

Regoliths vary from a few meters to over 150 m (490 ft) thick, depending on the age of the land surface, tectonic activity, climate, climate history and the composition of the bedrock. Although these deeply weathered terrains now occur in a wide variety of climates ranging from warm humid to arid, tropical to temperate, they were formed under similar conditions in the past. In parts of Africa, India, South America, Australia and southeast Asia, regolith has been forming continuously for over 100 million years. Deeply weathered regoliths are widespread in the inter-tropical belt, particularly on the continental landmasses between latitudes 35°N and 35°S. Similar weathered regoliths exist at much higher latitudes – 35–42°S in southeast Australia (Victoria and Tasmania), 40–45°N in the United States (Oregon and Wisconsin) and 55°N in Europe (Northern Ireland, Germany) – although these are not regionally extensive. In some localities it is possible to relatively date saprolite by considering that the saprolite must be younger than the parent material and older than any thick cover unit such a lava or sedimentary rock. This principle is useful in some contexts but in others, like certain parts of Sweden where grus is formed from Precambrian rocks and overlain by Quaternary deposits, it is of little value.

== Formation ==
The regolith of a region is the product of its long weathering history; leaching and dispersion are dominant during the initial phase of weathering under humid conditions. Saprolites form in high rainfall regions which result in chemical weathering and are characterised by distinct decomposition of the parent rock's mineralogy. Conditions for the formation of deeply weathered regolith include a topographically moderate relief flat enough to allow leaching of the products of chemical weathering. A second condition is long periods of tectonic stability; tectonic activity and climate change partially erode the regolith. Weathering rates of 20 m (66 ft) per million years suggest that deep regoliths require several million years to develop. The third condition is a humid tropical to temperate climate; higher temperatures enable reactions to occur more rapidly. Deep weathering can occur in cooler climates but over longer periods.

Sulfides are some of the most unstable minerals in humid, oxidizing environments; many cadmium, cobalt, copper, molybdenum, nickel and zinc sulfides are easily leached to deep in the profile. Carbonates are highly soluble, especially in acidic environments; the elements hosted by them – calcium, magnesium, manganese and strontium – are strongly leached. Serpentinite – oxidized and hydrolized low-silicon, iron- and magnesium-rich oxide igneous rocks – are progressively weathered through this zone. Ferromagnesian minerals are the principal hosts for nickel, cobalt, copper, and zinc in sulfide-poor mafic and ultramafic rocks and are retained higher in the profile than sulfide-hosted metals. They are leached from the upper horizons and reprecipitate with secondary iron-manganese oxides in the mid- to lower saprolite.

== Uses ==
Aquifers in Western Australia are of saprolite grit. Poorly weathered saprolite grit aquifers are capable of producing groundwater, often suitable for livestock. Yields depend on the texture of the materials and their depth from which the aquifer is derived.

The distributions of gold and calcium carbonate or calcium magnesium carbonates are closely correlated and documented in the southern Yilgarn craton, Western Australia, in the top 1 to 2 m (3.3 to 6.6 ft) of the soil profile and locally as deep as 5 m (16 ft). The gold-carbonate association is also apparent in the Gawler craton, South Australia. Supergene enrichment occurs near the surface and involves water circulation with its resulting oxidation and chemical weathering. Deep weathering causes the formation of many secondary and supergene ores – bauxite, iron ores, saprolitic gold, supergene copper, uranium and heavy minerals in residual accumulations.

== See also ==
- Inselberg – Isolated, steep rock hill on relatively flat terrain
- Residuum
