= Parent material =

Underlying geological material in which soil horizons form

Parent material is the underlying geological material (generally bedrock or a superficial or drift deposit) in which soil horizons form. Soils typically inherit a great deal of structure and minerals from their parent material, and, as such, are often classified based upon their contents of consolidated or unconsolidated mineral material that has undergone some degree of physical or chemical weathering and the mode by which the materials were most recently transported.

== Consolidated ==
Parent materials that are predominantly composed of consolidated rock are termed residual parent material. The consolidated rocks consist of igneous, sedimentary, and metamorphic rock, etc.

=== Residual ===
Soil developed in residual parent material is that which forms in consolidated geologic material.

== Unconsolidated ==
This parent material is loosely arranged, particles are not cemented together, and not stratified. This parent material is classified by its last means of transport. For example, material that was transported to a location by glacier, then deposited elsewhere by streams, is classified as stream-transported parent material, or glacial fluvial parent material.

=== Ice-transported ===
==== Glacial till (Morainal) ====
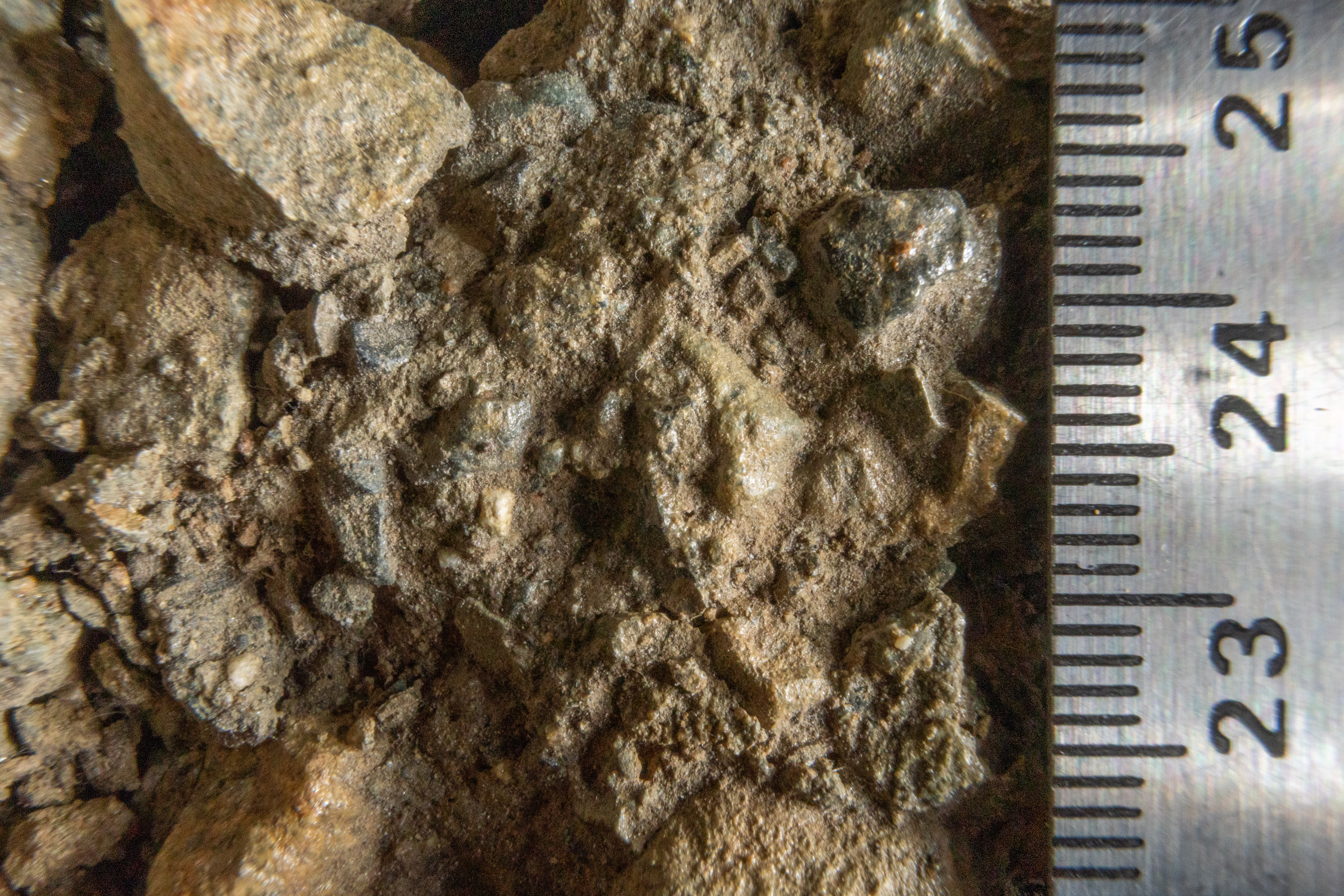
A macro photo of basal till parent material

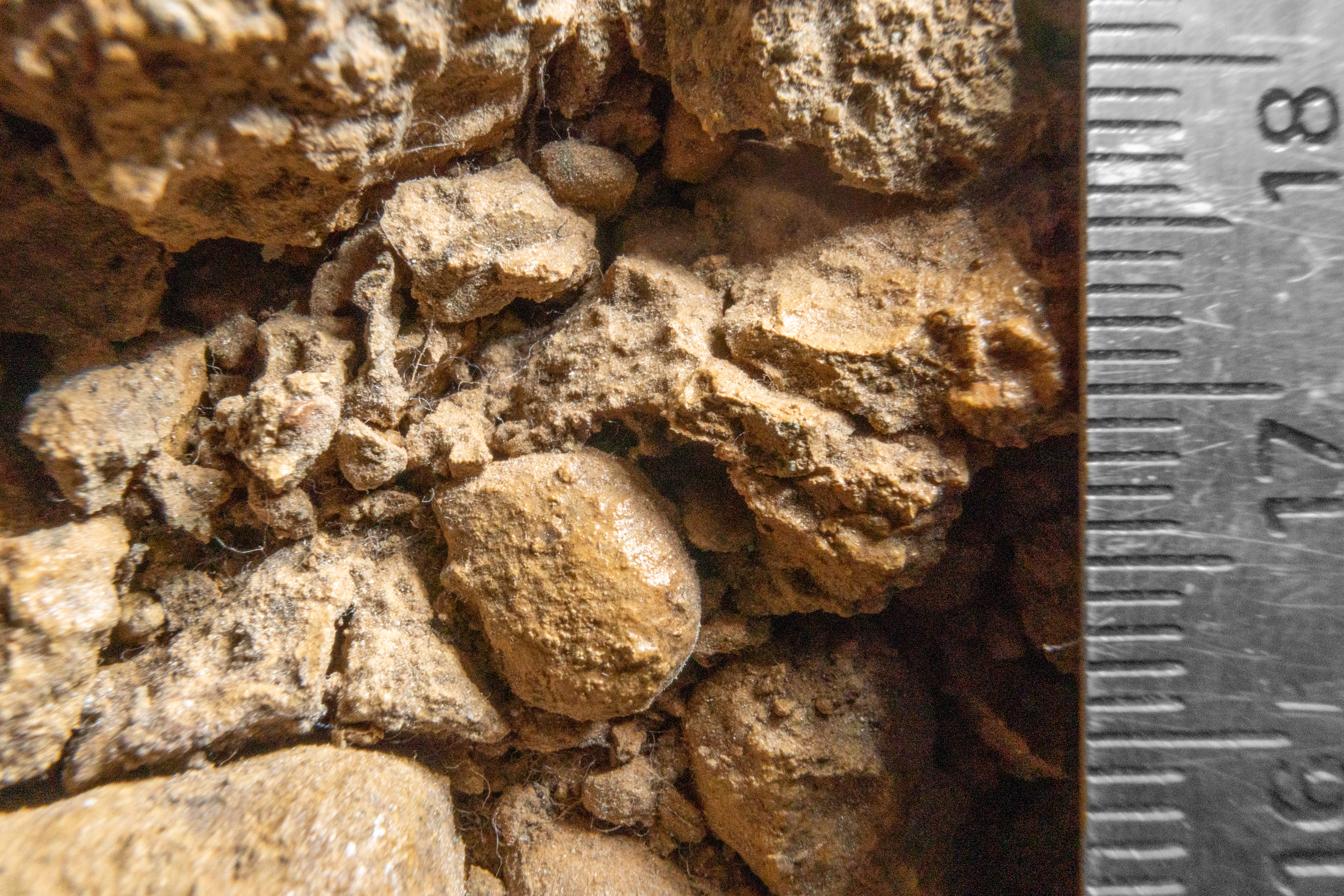
A macro photo of ablation till parent material

The material dragged with a moving ice sheet. Because it is not transported with liquid water, the material is not sorted by size. There are two kinds of glacial till:

1. Basal till – carried at the base of the glacier and laid underneath it. This till is typically very compacted and does not allow for quick water infiltration.
2. Ablation till – carried on or in the glacier and is laid down as the glacier melts. This till is typically less compacted than basal till.

==== Glacio-lacustrine ====
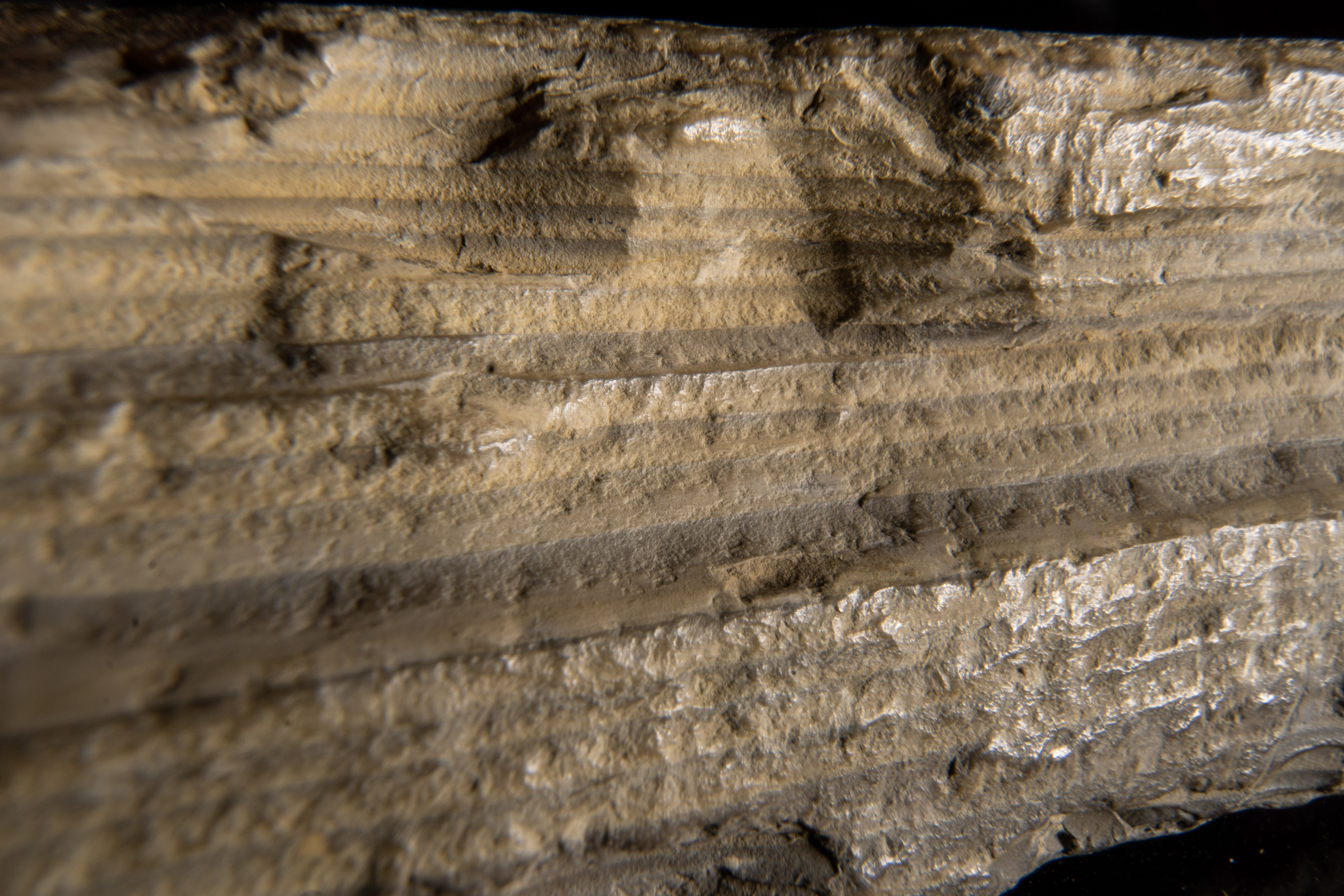
A macro photo of glacio-lacustrine parent material with clear varves

Parent material that is created from the sediments coming into lakes that come from glaciers. The lakes are typically ice margin lakes or other types formed from glacial erosion or deposition. The bedload of the rivers, containing the larger rocks and stones is deposited near the lake edge, while the suspended sediments are settle out all over the lake bed.

==== Glacio-fluvial ====
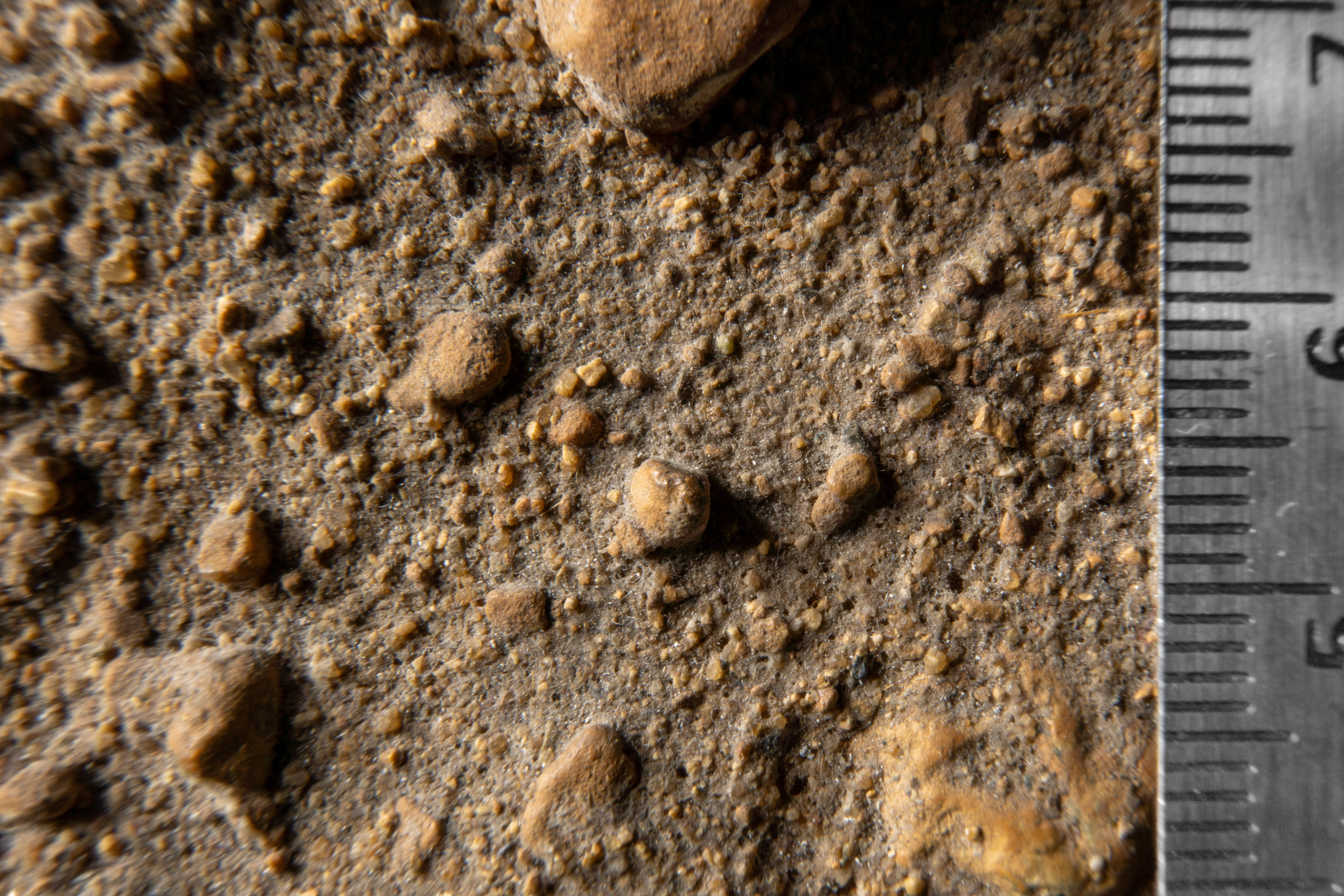
A macro photo of glacio-fluvial parent material

Consist of boulders, gravel, sand, silt and clay from ice sheets or glaciers. They are transported, sorted and deposited by streams of water. The deposits are formed beside, below or downstream from the ice.

==== Glacio-marine ====
These sediments are created when sediments have been transported to the oceans by glaciers or icebergs. They may contain large boulders, transported by and dropped from icebergs, in the midst of fine-grained sediments.

=== Water-transported ===
Within water-transported parent material there are several important types. A macro photo of glacio-lacustrine parent material with clear varves from annual deposition of material.

==== Alluvium ====
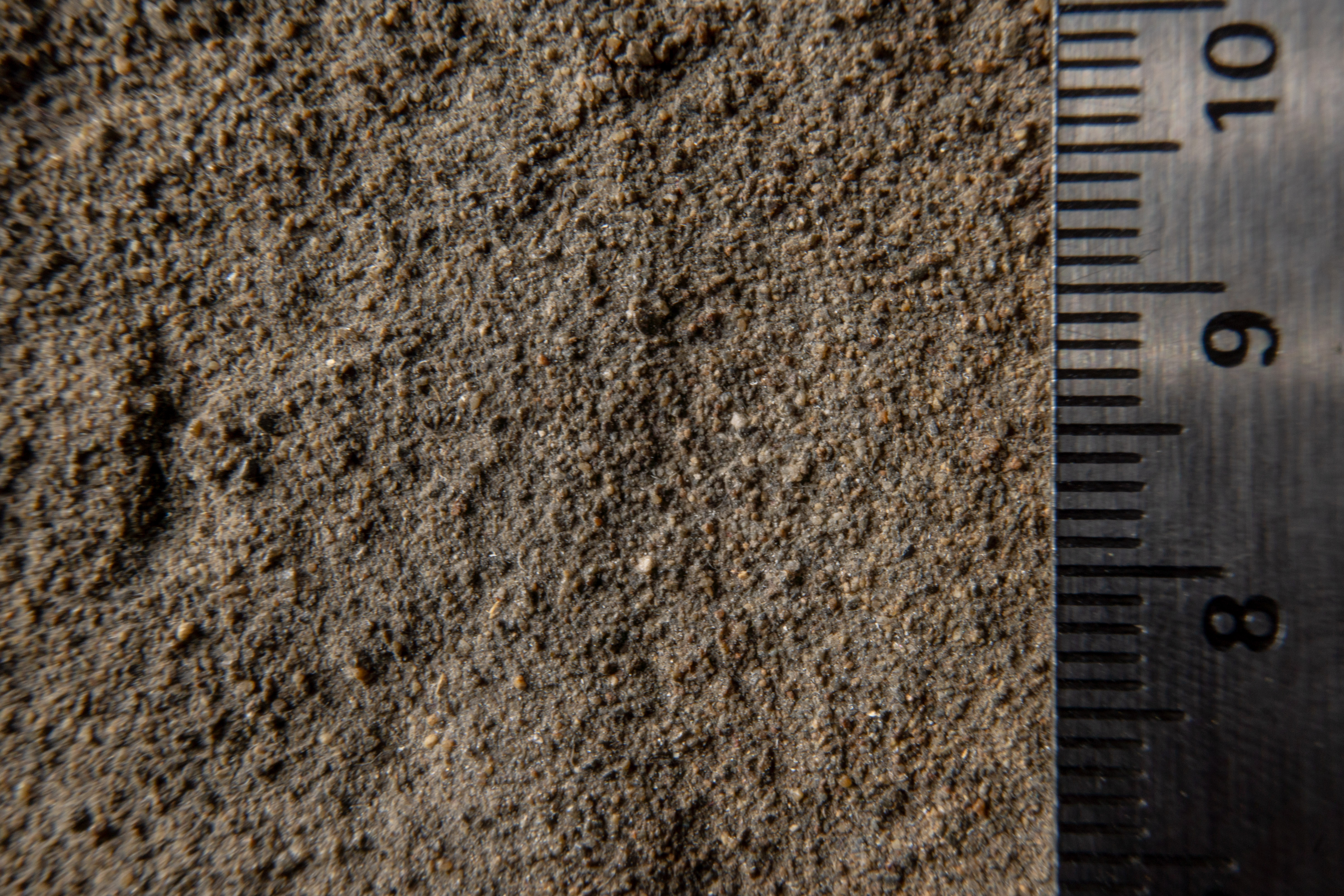
A macro photo of fluvial parent material

Parent material transported by streams of which there are three main types. Floodplains are the parts of river valleys that are covered with water during floods. Due to their seasonal nature, floods create stratified layers in which larger particles tend to settle nearer the channel and smaller particles settle nearer the edges of A macro photo of marine parent material showcasing deposition of manganese. Cracks present in the photo are due to drying, but would be massive in the field.the flooding area. Alluvial fans are sedimentary areas formed by narrow valley streams that suddenly drop to lowlands and widen dramatically. Sedimentary in these types of deposits tend to be larger closer to the uplands and finer near the edges of the fan. Delta deposits, the third of type of alluvium, are finer sediments that are discharged from streams into lakes and eventually settle near the mouth of the river.

==== Lacustrine ====
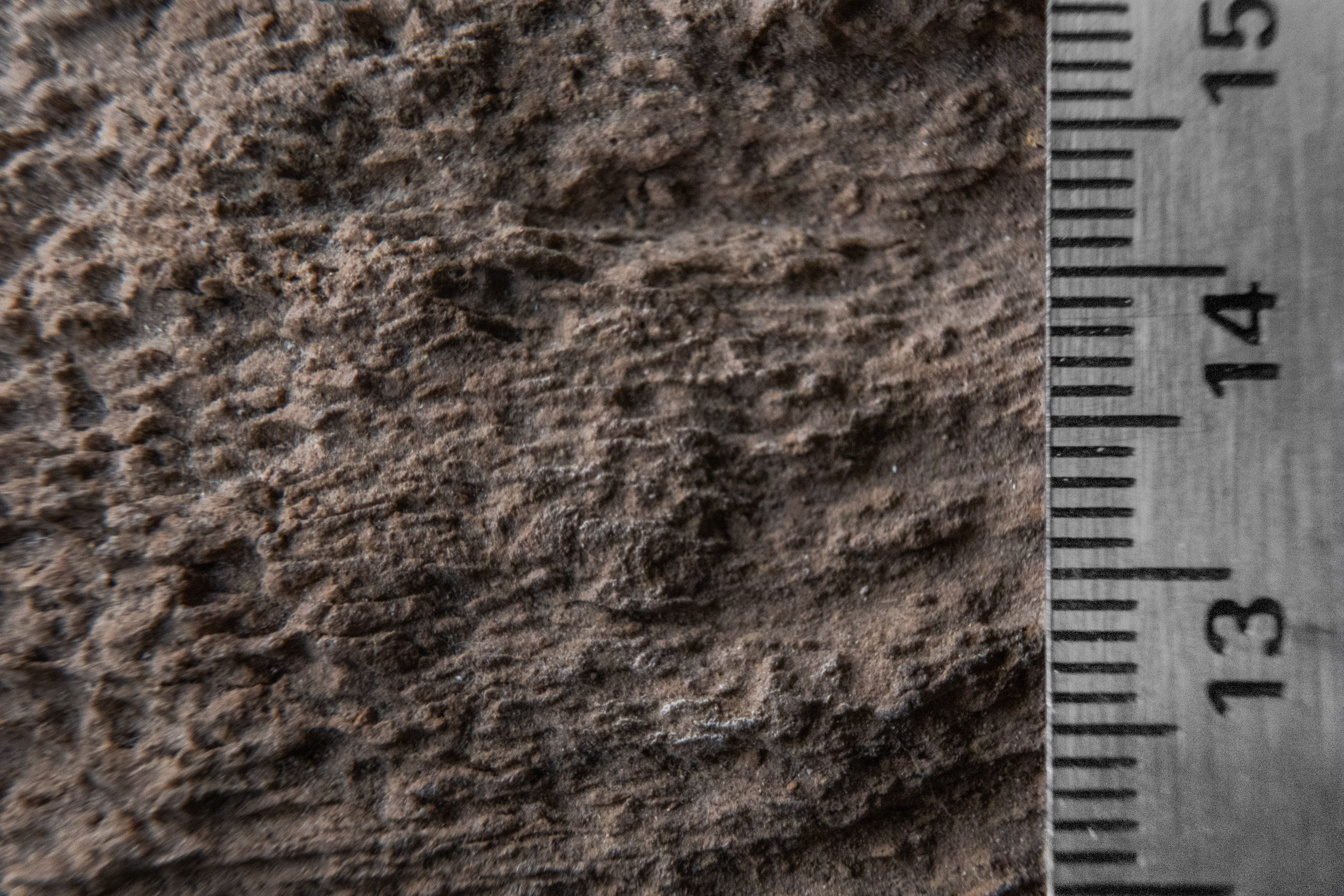
A macro photo of lacustrine parent material

Parent material deposited by a lake. Beach ridges may be present where ancient lakes once washed up sand. Lacustrine material is well sorted and fine-textured, having finer silts and clays. Soils formed from lacustrine parent material have low permeability in part because of this high clay content.

==== Marine ====
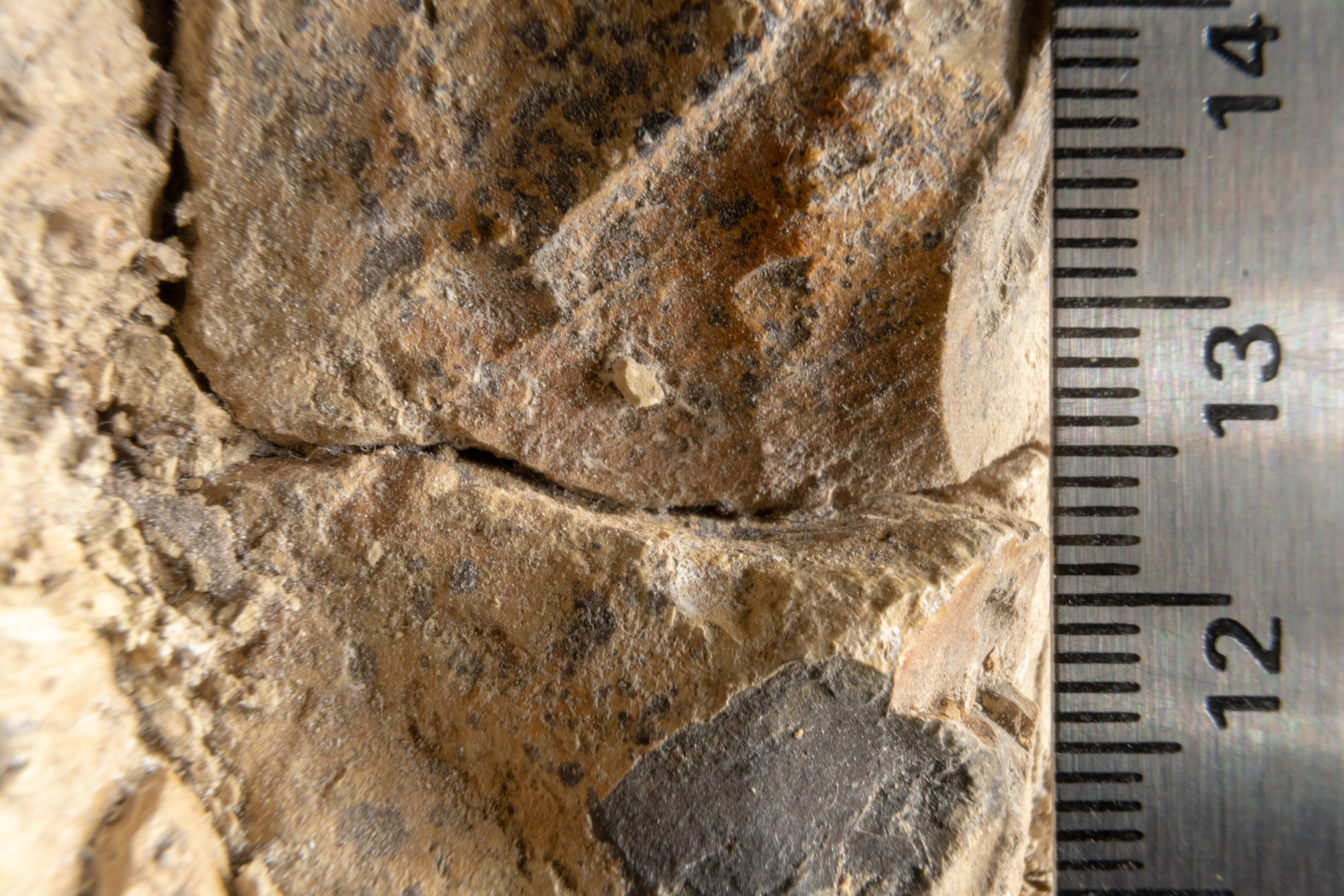
A macro photo of marine parent material showcasing deposition of manganese. The cracks present in the photo would not be present in the field.

Ocean deposited parent materials, called marine sediments, are collections of material that have been carried by rivers and streams to the ocean and eventually sink to the bottom. Such materials can vary in texture.

=== Gravity-transported ===
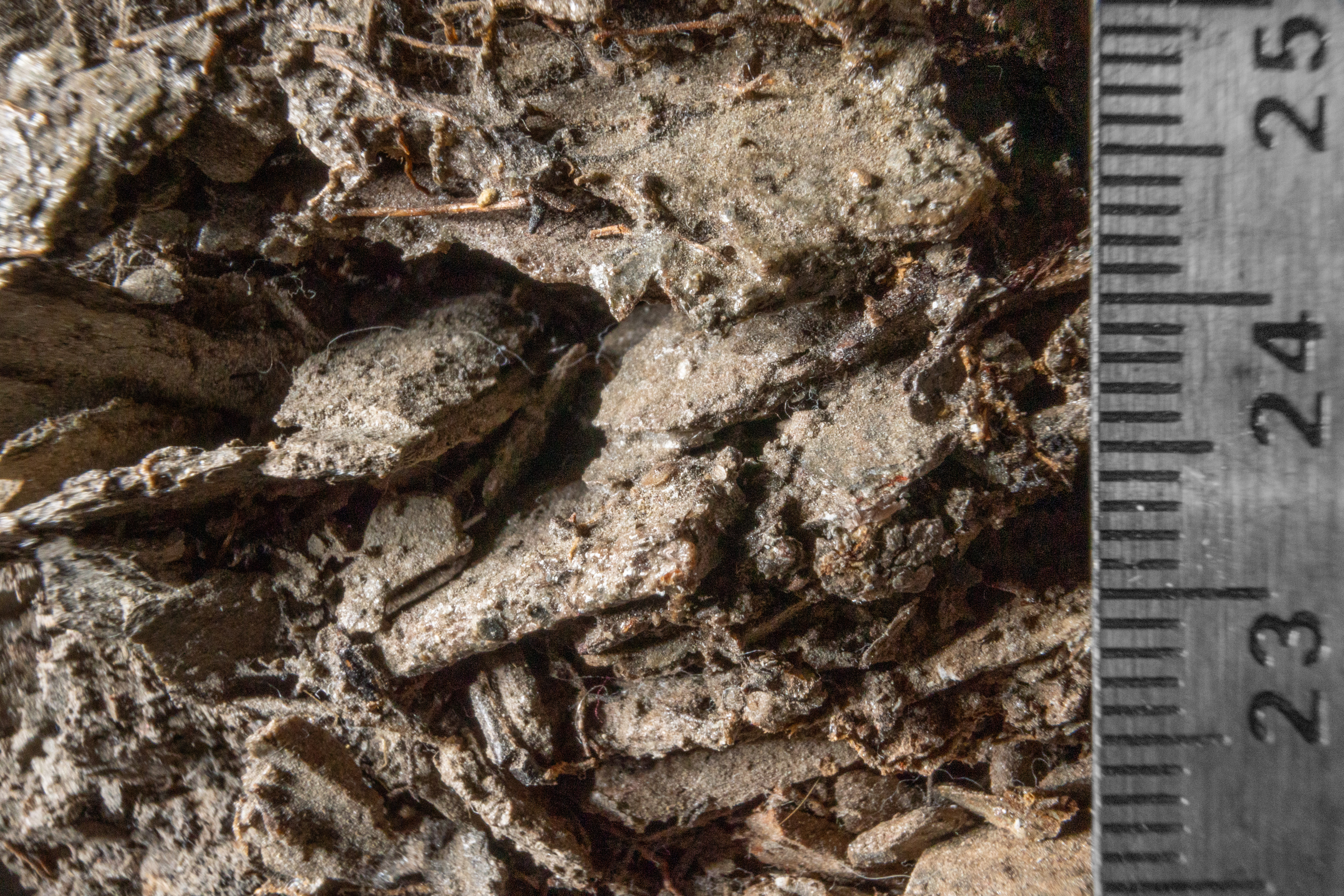
A macro photo of colluvial material

Colluvium or colluvial debris is the collection of large rock fragments that have traveled downslope by gravity.

=== Wind-transported ===
Parent materials can also be transported by wind. There are three important types.

==== Loess ====
Silt-sized sediments transported by the wind.

==== Aeolian ====
Sand-sized particles transported by the wind, typically as dunes.

==== Volcanic tephra ====
The most common parent material coming from volcanoes is volcanic ash carried away by the wind and settling at various distances from the volcano.

== Organic ==
Organic deposits (or cumulose deposits) are developed in place from plant residue (for example sphagnum moss) that has typically been preserved by a high water table, or potentially due to another factor that slows decomposition.

== See also ==
- Saprolite
- Soil production function
