= Leaching (pedology) =

Water removing soluble material from soil

In pedology, leaching is the removal of soluble materials from one zone in soil to another via water movement in the profile. It is a mechanism of soil formation distinct from the soil forming process of eluviation, which is the loss of mineral and organic colloids. Leached and eluviated materials tend to be lost from topsoil and deposited in subsoil. A soil horizon accumulating leached and eluviated materials is referred to as a zone of illuviation.

Laterite soil, which develops in regions with high temperature and heavy rainfall, is an example of this process in action.

== See also ==
- Bioleaching
- Biomineralisation
- Dissolved load
- Leaching (agriculture)
- Groundwater recharge
- Soil salinity control
