= Plinthite =

Plinthite (from the Greek plinthos, brick) is an iron-rich, humus-poor mixture of clay with quartz and other minerals.

Plinthite is a redoximorphic feature in highly weathered soil. The product of pedogenesis, it commonly occurs as dark red redox concretions that usually form platy, polygonal, or reticulate patterns. Plinthite changes irreversibly to an ironstone hardpan or to irregular soil aggregates on exposure to repeated wetting and drying, especially if it is also exposed to heat from the sun. The lower boundary of a zone in which plinthite occurs generally is diffuse or gradual, but it may be abrupt at a lithologic discontinuity. Generally, plinthite forms in a soil horizon that is saturated with water for some time during the year. Initially, iron is normally segregated in the form of soft, more or less clayey, red or dark red redox concretions. These concretions are not considered plinthite unless there has been enough segregation of iron to permit their irreversible hardening on exposure to repeated wetting and drying. Plinthite is firm or very firm when the soil moisture content is near field capacity and hard when the moisture content is below the permanent wilting point.

Plinthite concretions are coherent enough to be separated readily from the surrounding soil. Plinthite commonly occurs within and above reticulately mottled horizons. The part of the iron-rich body that is not plinthite normally stains the fingers when rubbed while wet, but the plinthite center does not. It has a harsh, dry feel when rubbed, even if wet.

Plinthite does not harden irreversibly as a result of a single cycle of drying and rewetting. After a single drying, it will remoisten and then can be dispersed in large part if one shakes it in water with a dispersing agent. In a moist soil, plinthite is soft enough to be cut with a spade. After irreversible hardening, it is no longer considered plinthite but is called ironstone. Indurated ironstone materials can be broken or shattered with a spade but cannot be dispersed if one shakes them in water with a dispersing agent.
