= Colluvium =

Loose, unconsolidated sediments deposited at the base of a hillslope

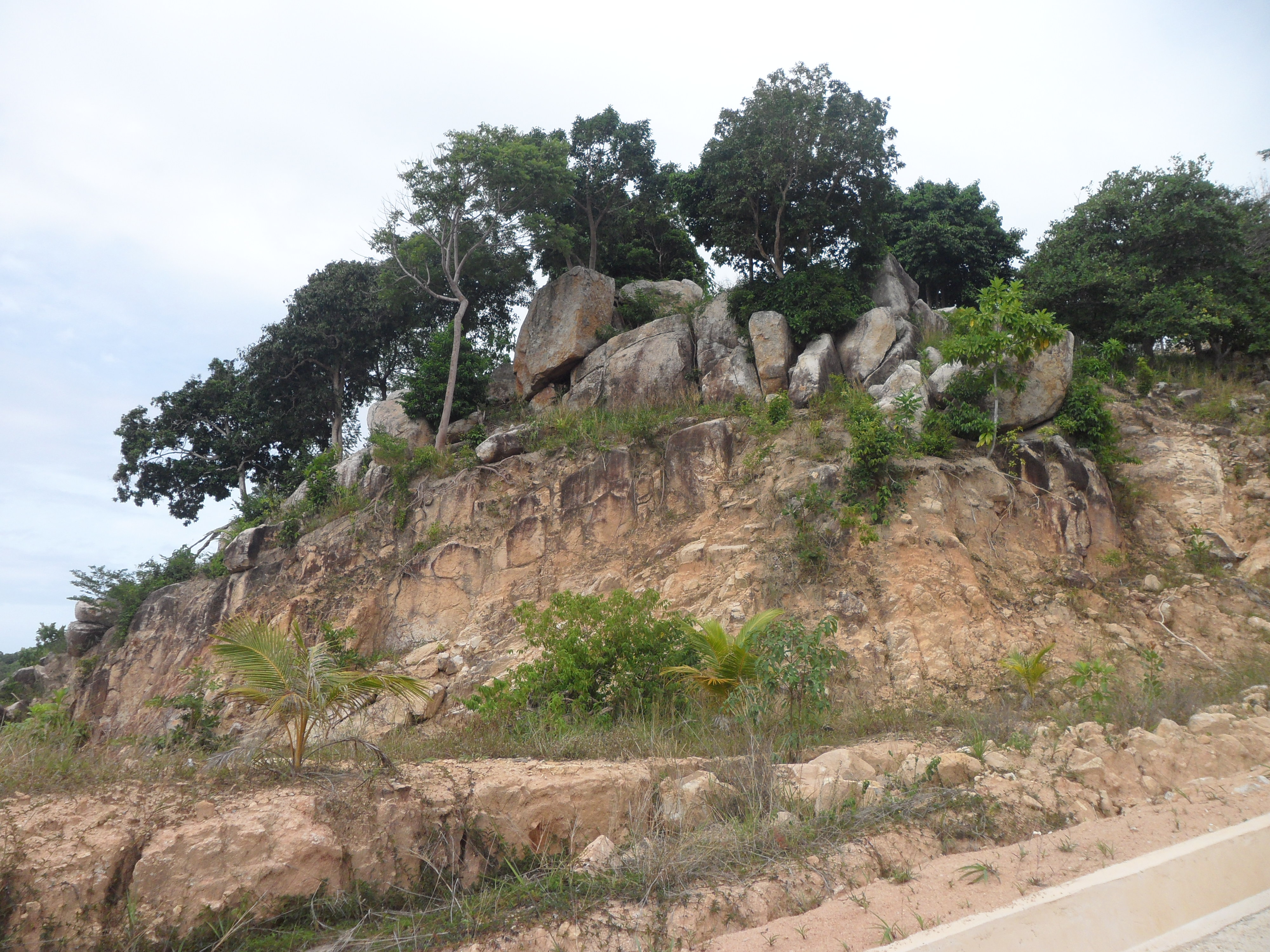
Erosion on Koh Tao Island

Colluvium (also colluvial material or colluvial soil; from the Latin colluvio, 'jumbled') is a general name for loose, unconsolidated terrigenous sediments (diamicton) that have been deposited at the base of hillslopes by either rainwash, sheetwash, slow continuous downslope creep, or a variable combination of these processes. Colluvium is typically composed of a heterogeneous range of rock types and sediments ranging from silt to rock fragments of various sizes. This term is also used to specifically refer to sediment deposited at the base of a hillslope by unconcentrated surface runoff or sheet erosion.

== Location ==
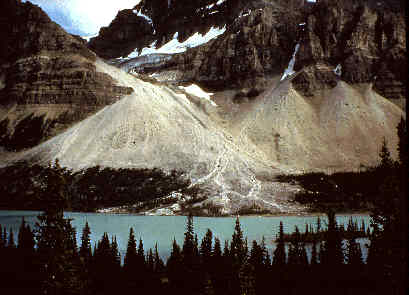
This talus accumulation is an example of colluvium

Colluviation refers to the buildup of colluvium at the base of a hillslope. Colluvium is typically loosely consolidated angular material located at the base of a steep hill slope or cliff. Colluvium accumulates as gently sloping aprons or fans, either at the base of or within gullies and hollows within hillslopes. These accumulations of colluvium can be several meters in thickness and often contain buried soils (paleosols), crude bedding, and cut and fill sequences.

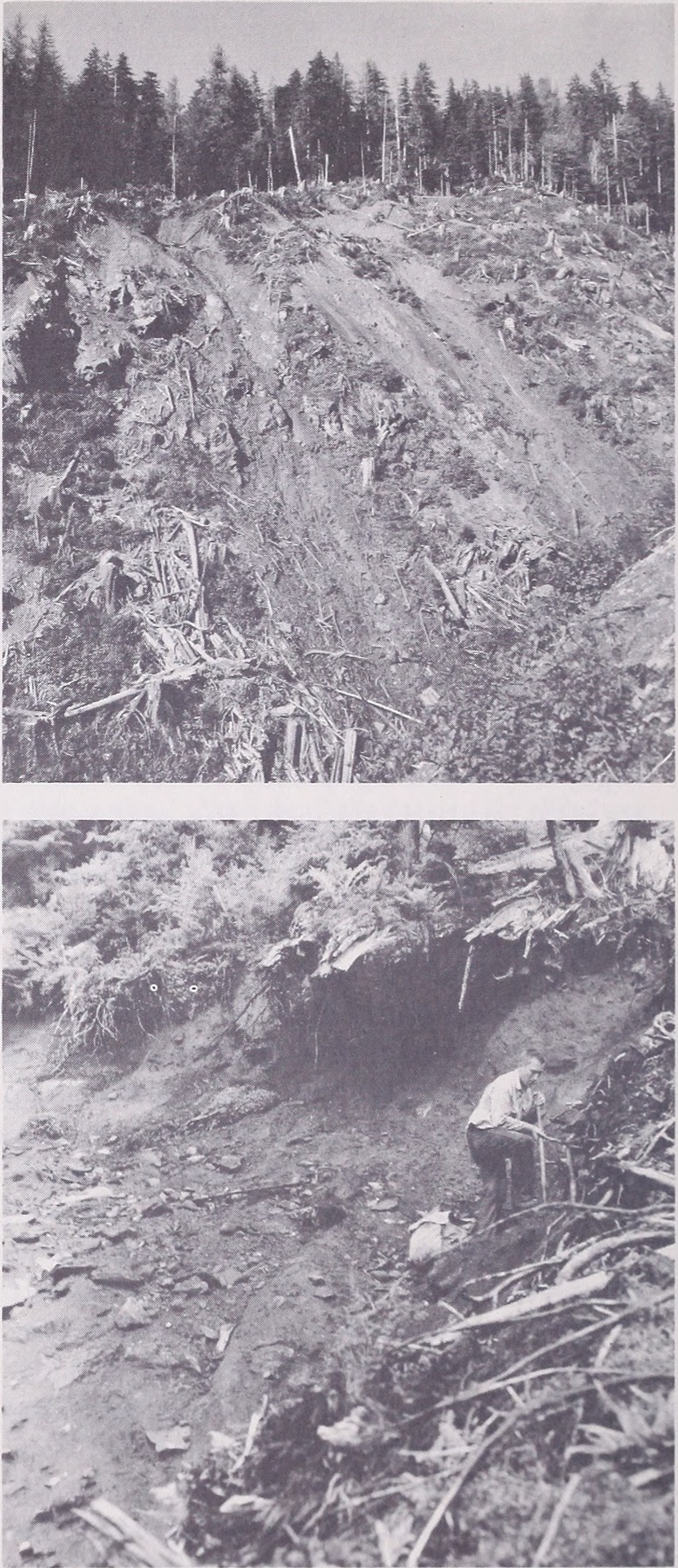
Mass wasting in coastal Alaska

== Importance ==
Thick accumulations of colluvium may preserve a rich record of long term paleoclimatic change based on the paleosols and the remains of plants and animals, invertebrate and vertebrates that they often contain. These fossils indicate previous geologic and environmental settings. Thick accumulations of colluvium often contain well-preserved and sometimes deeply buried archaeological deposits as excavated at the Cherokee Sewer Site, Cherokee County, Iowa, and the Koster Site, Greene County, Illinois. Colluvium can also be rocks that have been transported downward from glaciers and so can indicate past stages of cooler and/or wetter weather. Deposits of detrital colluvium can reveal the soil composition and signify processes of chemical weathering.

== Compared to alluvium ==
The definitions of colluvium and alluvium are interdependent and reliant on one another. Distinctions between the two are important in order to properly define the geomorphic processes that have occurred in a specific geological setting. Alluvium is sand, clay, or other similar detrital material deposited by running water. The distinction between colluvium and alluvium relates to the involvement of running water. Alluvium specifically refers to the geomorphic processes involved with flowing water and so alluvium is generally fine-grained clay and silt material that has the capacity to be entrained in water currents and eventually deposited. For these same reasons, alluvium is also generally well sorted material while colluvium is not. An issue with using particle size or heterogeneity of sediment to distinguish between colluvium and alluvium is the dependence on source material. If the source material is fine grained and homogenous, it could be difficult to discern which transportation process (colluvium or alluvium) created the sediment deposition.

== See also ==
- Colluvium-filled bedrock hollow
- Diluvium
- Eluvium
- Erosion
- Illuvium
- Scree
- Diamicton
- Periglacial Head
