= Umbric horizon =

Thick, dark coloured, surface soil horizon rich in organic matter

The umbric horizon (Latin: umbra, shade) is a thick, dark coloured, surface soil horizon rich in organic matter. It is identified by its dark colour and structure. Normally it has a pH of less than 5.5 representing a base saturation of less than 50 percent. An indication for soil acidity is a rooting pattern whereby the roots tend to be horizontal.

Similar thick, dark coloured, organic-rich, base-desaturated surface horizons occur in anthropedogenic horizons from human activities such as deep cultivation, kitchen middens and the addition of organic manures etc. These horizons can usually be differentiated by the presence of artifacts, spade marks or by checking the agricultural history of the area.

In the World Reference Base for Soil Resources (WRB), the umbric horizon is a diagnostic horizon. The diagnostic criteria are:

- Soil structure sufficiently strong that the horizon is not both massive and hard or very hard when dry.
- Munsell colours with a chroma and value ≤ 3 when moist and a value ≤ 5 when dry, both on slightly crushed samples.
- It is described as base-desaturated in that it has a base saturation of < 50% on a weighted average throughout the depth of the horizon; and
- Soil organic carbon content of ≥ 0.6% throughout the thickness of mixed horizon; and
- A thickness of ≥ 100 mm if resting directly on hard rock; ≥ 200 mm else.
