= Illuvium =

Material displaced across a soil profile

Illuvium is material displaced across a soil profile, from one layer to another one, by the action of rainwater. The removal of material from a soil layer is called eluviation. The transport of the material may be either mechanical or chemical. The process of deposition of illuvium is termed illuviation. It is a water-assisted transport in a basically vertical direction, as compared to alluviation, the horizontal running water transfer. The resulting deposits are called illuvial deposits. Cutans are a type of illuvial deposit.

Illuvium includes organic matter, silicate clay, and hydrous oxides of iron and aluminum.

Illuvial deposits of clays, oxides, and organics accumulate in subsoil as distinctive soil horizons classified as "B horizons" or "zones of illuviation".

== Mechanical illuviation ==
When percolating rain water reaches a drier soil horizon, water from the suspension is removed by capillary action of microchannels, leaving fine deposits (cutans) oriented along percolation macrochannels.

== Examples ==
- Mesara Plain, Crete, Greece

== Chemical illuviation ==
Transport of soil solutes is termed leaching. Soluble constituents are deposited due to differences in soil chemistry, especially soil pH and redox potential.

== See also ==
- Alluvium
- Colluvium
- Diluvium
- Eluvium
