= Eluvium =

End product of rock weathering

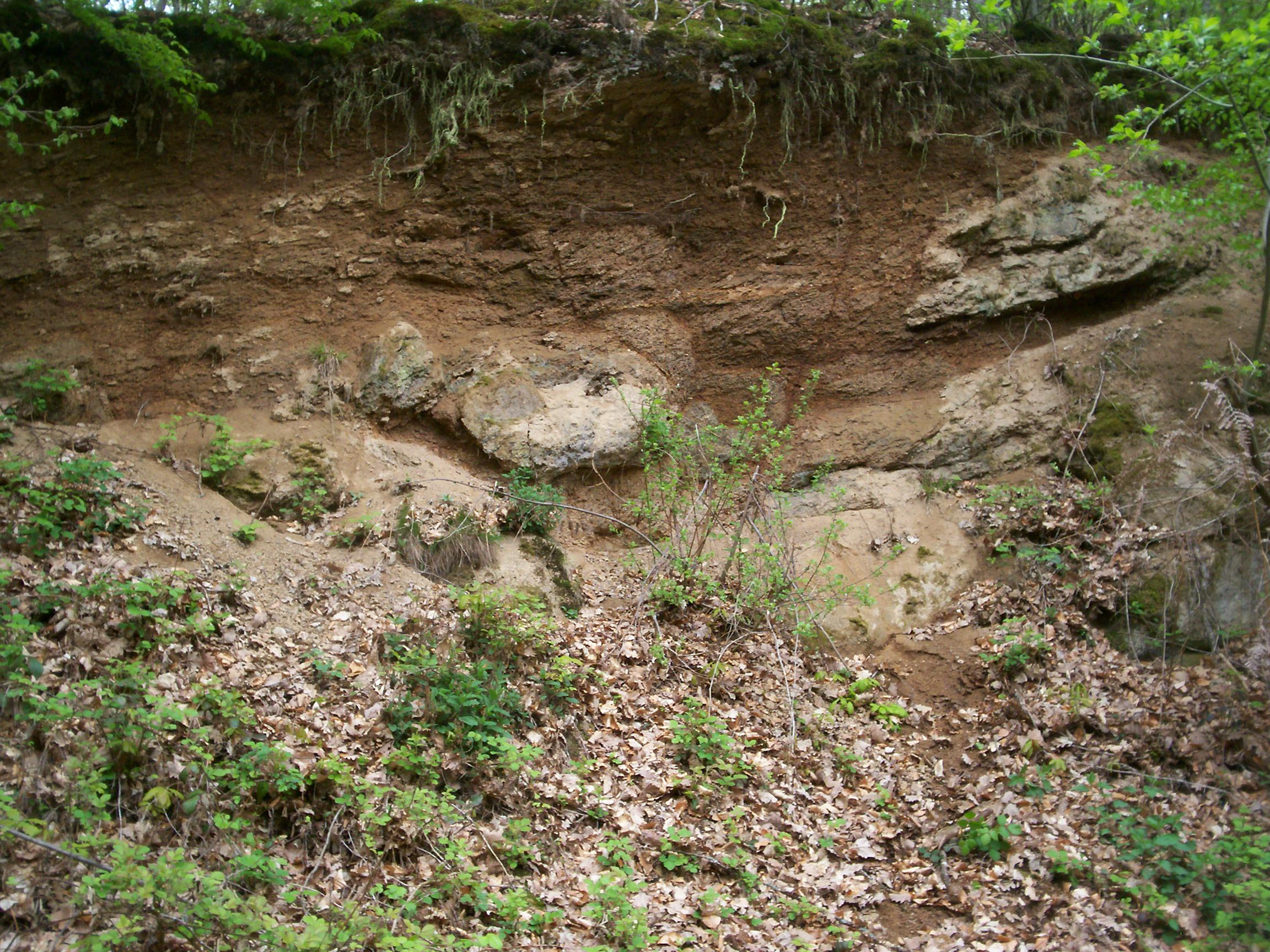
Granitic grus with weathered granite blocks in the Serre Massif (Jura, France)

In geology, eluvium or eluvial deposits are geological deposits and soils that are derived by in situ weathering or weathering plus gravitational movement or accumulation.

The process of removal of materials from geological or soil horizons is called eluviation or leaching. There is a difference in the usage of this term in geology and soil science. In soil science, eluviation is the transport of soil material from upper layers of soil to lower levels by downward percolation of water across soil horizons, and accumulation of this material (illuvial deposit) in lower levels is called illuviation. In geology, the removed material is irrelevant, and the deposit (eluvial deposit) is the remaining material. Eluviation occurs when precipitation exceeds evaporation.

A soil horizon formed due to eluviation is an eluvial zone or eluvial horizon. In a typical soil profile, the eluvial horizon refers to a light-colored zone located (depending on context and literature) either at the lower part of the A horizon (symbol: Ae) or within a distinct horizon (E horizon) below the A, where the process is most intense and rapid. Yet some sources consider the eluvial zone to be the A horizon plus the (distinct) E horizon, as eluviation technically occurs in both.

The strict eluvial horizon (E horizon) is typically light gray, clay-depleted, contains little organic matter and has a high concentration of silt and sand particles composed of quartz and other resistant minerals.

Eluvial ore deposits are those such as tungsten and gold placer deposits formed by settling and enriched by the winnowing or removal of lower density materials. Diamonds within yellow ground (weathered portions of kimberlites) may be considered to be eluvial deposits. Cassiterite and columbite-tantalite deposits also occur as residual or eluvial concentrations. The Pitinga tin deposit in Brazil, an eluvial deposit, is one of the largest tin mines in the world. Weathering supergene enrichment of an apatite rich carbonatite in Ontario has produced a significant eluvial phosphate ore deposit.

== See also ==
- Alluvium
- Colluvium
- Diluvium
- Lessivage
