= Streptomyces graminisoli =

Scientific classification
- Domain: Bacteria
- Kingdom: Bacillati
- Phylum: Actinomycetota
- Class: Actinomycetia
- Order: Streptomycetales
- Family: Streptomycetaceae
- Genus: Streptomyces
- Species: S. graminisoli

Binomial name
- Streptomyces graminisoli Lee and Whang 2014

Type strain
- JR-19, KACC 16472, NBRC 108883

Species of bacterium

Streptomyces graminisoli is a bacterium species from the genus of Streptomyces which has been isolated together with Streptomyces rhizophilus from rhizosphere soil from the plant Sasa borealis.

== See also ==
- List of Streptomyces species
