= Soil formation =

Process of soil formation

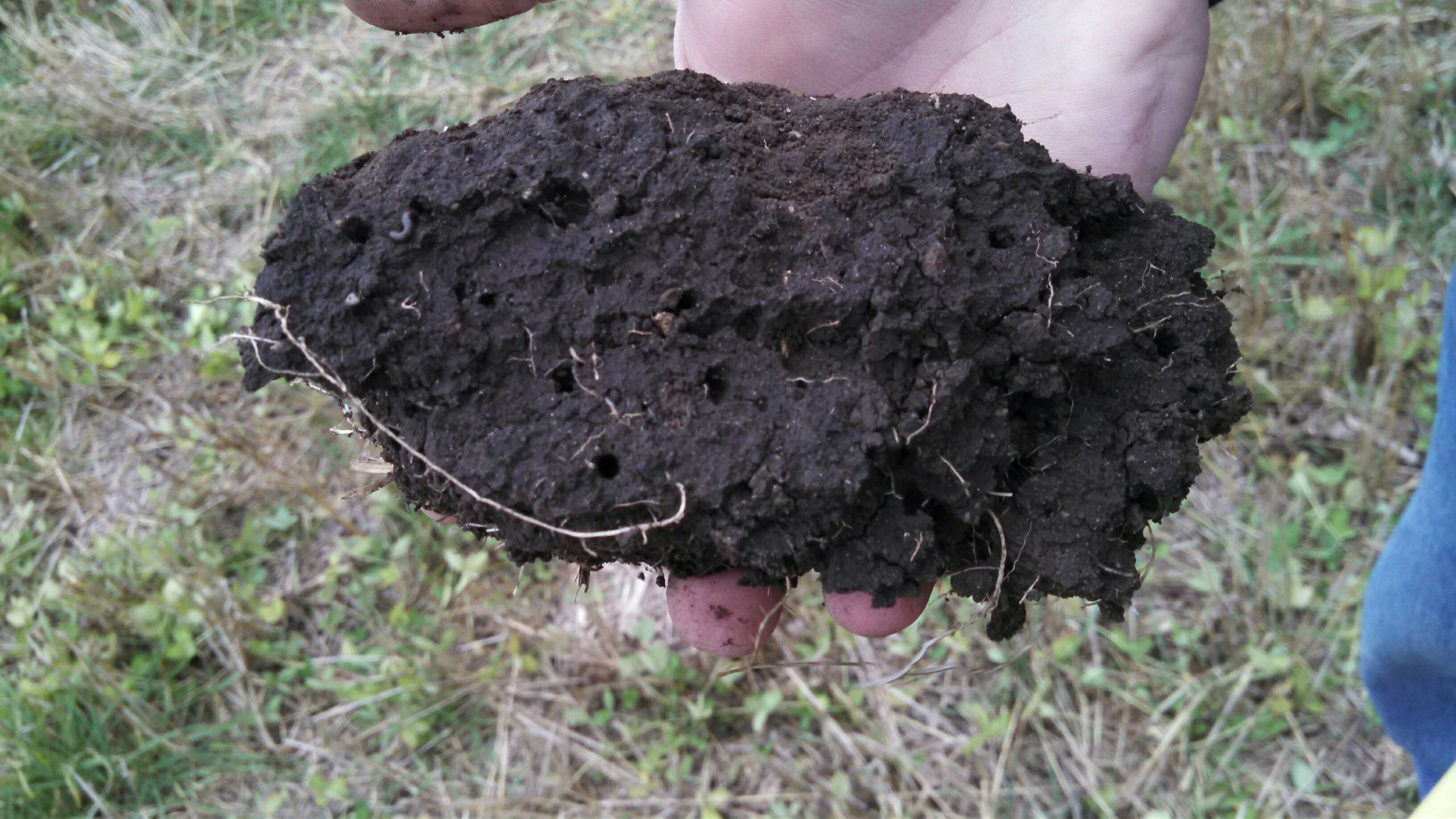
Soil created on a no-till farm in South Dakota, United States

Soil formation, also known as pedogenesis, is the process of soil genesis as regulated by the effects of place, environment, and history. Biogeochemical processes act to both create and destroy order (anisotropy) within soils. These alterations lead to the development of layers, termed soil horizons, distinguished by differences in color, structure, texture, and chemistry. These features occur in patterns of soil type distribution, forming in response to differences in soil forming factors.

Pedogenesis is studied as a branch of pedology, the study of soil in its natural environment. Other branches of pedology are the study of soil morphology and soil classification. The study of pedogenesis is important to understanding soil distribution patterns in current (soil geography) and past (paleopedology) geologic periods.

== Overview ==
Soil develops through a series of changes. The starting point is weathering of freshly accumulated parent material. A variety of soil microbes (bacteria, archaea, fungi) feed on simple compounds (nutrients) released by weathering and produce organic acids and specialized proteins which contribute in turn to mineral weathering. They also leave behind organic residues which contribute to humus formation. Plant roots with their symbiotic mycorrhizal fungi are also able to extract nutrients from rocks.

New soils increase in depth by a combination of weathering and further deposition. In Sicily under Mediterranean climate the soil production rate due to weathering is approximately 1/10 mm per year. New soils can also deepen from dust deposition. Gradually soil is able to support higher forms of plants and animals, starting with pioneer species and proceeding along ecological succession to more complex plant and animal communities. Topsoils deepen with the accumulation of humus originating from dead remains of higher plants and soil microbes. They also deepen through mixing of organic matter with weathered minerals. As soils mature, they develop soil horizons as organic matter accumulates and mineral weathering and leaching take place.

== Factors ==
Soil formation is influenced by at least five classic factors that are intertwined in the evolution of a soil. They are: parent material, climate, topography (relief), soil organisms, and time. When reordered to climate, organisms, relief, parent material, and time, they form the acronym CLORPT.

=== Parent material ===
The mineral material from which a soil forms is called parent material. Rock, whether its origin is igneous, sedimentary, or metamorphic, is the source of all soil mineral materials and the origin of all plant nutrients with the exceptions of nitrogen, hydrogen and carbon. As the parent rock is chemically and physically weathered, transported, deposited and precipitated, it is transformed into a soil.

Typical soil parent mineral materials are:

- Quartz: SiO_{2}
- Calcite: CaCO_{3}
- Feldspar: KAlSi_{3}O_{8}
- Mica (biotite): K(Mg,Fe)_{3}(AlSi_{3}O_{10})(F,OH)_{2}

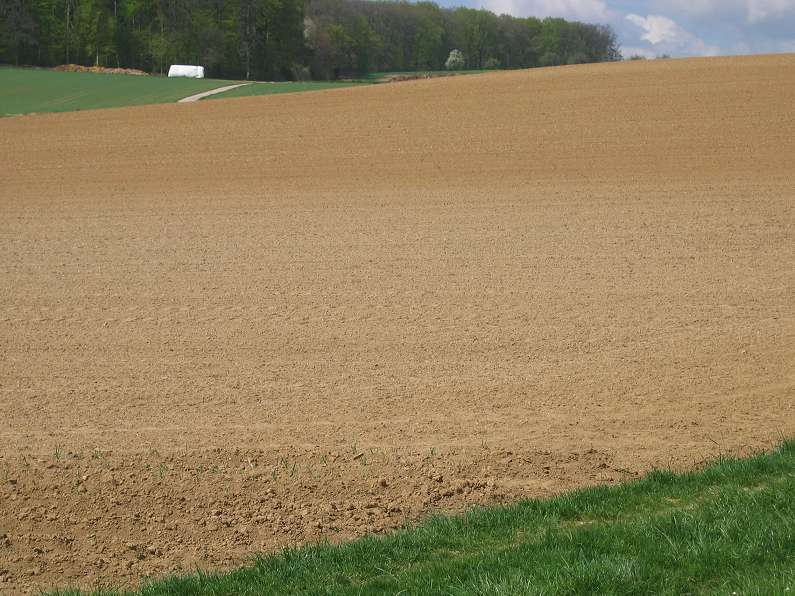
Soil, on an agricultural field in Germany, which has formed on loess parent material

Parent materials are classified according to how they came to be deposited. Residual materials are mineral materials that have weathered in place from primary bedrock. Transported materials are those that have been deposited by water, wind, ice or gravity. Cumulose material is organic matter that has grown and accumulates in place.

Residual soils are soils that develop from their underlying parent rocks and have the same general chemistry as those rocks. Residual soils can be found on mesas and volcanoes. In the United States as little as three percent of the soils are residual.

Most soils derive from transported materials that have been moved many miles by wind, water, ice and gravity:

- Aeolian processes (movement by wind) are capable of moving silt and fine sand many hundreds of miles, forming loess soils (60–90 percent silt), common in the Midwestern United States and Canada, north-western Europe, Argentina and Central Asia. Clay is seldom moved by wind as it forms stable aggregates.
- Water-transported materials are classed as either alluvial, lacustrine, or marine. Alluvial materials are those moved and deposited by flowing water. Sedimentary deposits settled in lakes are called lacustrine. Lake Bonneville and many soils around the Great Lakes are examples. Marine deposits, such as soils along the Gulf Coast and in the Imperial Valley of California are the beds of ancient seas that have been revealed as the land uplifted.
- Ice moves parent material and makes deposits in the form of terminal and lateral moraines in the case of stationary glaciers. Retreating glaciers leave smoother ground moraines, and in all cases outwash plains are left as alluvial deposits are moved downstream from the glacier.
- Parent material moved by gravity is obvious at the base of steep slopes as talus cones and is called colluvial material.

Cumulose parent material is not moved but originates from deposited organic material. This includes peat and muck soils and results from preservation of plant residues by the low oxygen content of a high water table. While peat may form sterile soils, muck soils may be very fertile.

==== Weathering ====
The weathering of parent material takes the form of physical weathering (disintegration), chemical weathering (decomposition) and chemical transformation. Weathering is usually confined to the top few meters of geologic material, because physical, chemical, and biological stresses and fluctuations generally decrease with depth. Physical disintegration begins as rocks that have solidified deep in the Earth are exposed to lower pressure near the surface and swell and become mechanically unstable. Chemical decomposition is a function of mineral solubility, the rate of which doubles with each 10 °C rise in temperature but is strongly dependent on water to effect chemical changes. Rocks that will decompose in a few years in tropical climates will remain unaltered for millennia in deserts. Structural changes are the result of hydration, oxidation, and reduction. Chemical weathering mainly results from the excretion of organic acids and chelating compounds by bacteria and fungi, and is thought to increase under greenhouse effect.

- Physical disintegration is the first stage in the transformation of parent material into soil. Temperature fluctuations cause expansion and contraction of the rock, splitting it along lines of weakness. Water may then enter the cracks and freeze and cause the physical splitting of material along a path toward the center of the rock, while temperature gradients within the rock can cause exfoliation of "shells". Cycles of wetting and drying cause soil particles to be abraded to a finer size, as does the physical rubbing of material as it is moved by wind, water, and gravity. Organisms may reduce parent material size and create crevices and pores through the mechanical action of plant roots and the digging activity of animals.
- Chemical decomposition and structural changes result when minerals are made soluble by water or are changed in structure. The first three of the following list are solubility changes, and the last three are structural changes.
1. The solution of salts in water results from the action of bipolar water molecules on ionic salt compounds producing a solution of ions and water, removing those minerals and reducing the rock's integrity, at a rate depending on water flow and pore channels.
2. Hydrolysis is the transformation of minerals into polar molecules by the splitting of intervening water. This results in soluble acid-base pairs. For example, the hydrolysis of orthoclase-feldspar transforms it to acid silicate clay and basic potassium hydroxide, both of which are more soluble.
3. In carbonation, the solution of carbon dioxide in water forms carbonic acid. Carbonic acid will transform calcite into more soluble calcium bicarbonate.
4. Hydration is the inclusion of water in a mineral structure, causing it to swell and leaving it stressed and easily decomposed.
5. Oxidation of a mineral compound is the inclusion of oxygen in a mineral, causing it to increase its oxidation number and swell due to the relatively large size of oxygen, leaving it stressed and more easily attacked by water (hydrolysis) or carbonic acid (carbonation).
6. Reduction, the opposite of oxidation, means the removal of oxygen, hence the oxidation number of some part of the mineral is reduced, which occurs when oxygen is scarce. The reduction of minerals leaves them electrically unstable, more soluble and internally stressed and easily decomposed. It mainly occurs in waterlogged conditions.

Of the above, hydrolysis and carbonation are the most effective, in particular in regions of high rainfall, temperature and physical erosion. Chemical weathering becomes more effective as the surface area of the rock increases, thus is favoured by physical disintegration. This stems in latitudinal and altitudinal climate gradients in regolith formation.

Saprolite is a particular example of a residual soil formed from the transformation of granite, metamorphic and other types of bedrock into clay minerals. Often called weathered granite, saprolite is the result of weathering processes that include: hydrolysis, chelation from organic compounds, hydration and physical processes that include freezing and thawing. The mineralogical and chemical composition of the primary bedrock material, its physical features (including grain size and degree of consolidation), and the rate and type of weathering transforms the parent material into a different mineral. The texture, pH and mineral constituents of saprolite are inherited from its parent material. This process is also called arenization, resulting in the formation of sandy soils, thanks to the much higher resistance of quartz compared to other mineral components of granite (e.g., mica, amphibole, feldspar).

=== Climate ===
The principal climatic variables influencing soil formation are effective precipitation (i.e., precipitation minus evapotranspiration) and temperature, both of which affect the rates of chemical, physical, and biological processes. Temperature and moisture both influence the organic matter content of soil through their effects on the balance between primary production and decomposition: the colder or drier the climate the lesser atmospheric carbon is fixed as organic matter while the lesser organic matter is decomposed. Climate also indirectly influences soil formation through the effects of vegetation cover and biological activity, which modify the rates of chemical reactions in the soil.

Climate is the dominant factor in soil formation, and soils show the distinctive characteristics of the climate zones in which they form, with a feedback to climate through transfer of carbon stocked in soil horizons back to the atmosphere. If warm temperatures and abundant water are present in the profile at the same time, the processes of weathering, leaching, and plant growth will be maximized. According to the climatic determination of biomes, humid climates favor the growth of trees. In contrast, grasses are the dominant native vegetation in subhumid and semiarid regions, while shrubs and brush of various kinds dominate in arid areas.

Water is essential for all the major chemical weathering reactions. To be effective in soil formation, water must penetrate the regolith. The seasonal rainfall distribution, evaporative losses, site topography, and soil permeability interact to determine how effectively precipitation can influence soil formation. The greater the depth of water penetration, the greater the depth of weathering of the soil and its development. Surplus water percolating through the soil profile transports soluble and suspended materials from the upper layers (eluviation) to the lower layers (illuviation), including clay particles and dissolved organic matter. It may also carry away soluble materials in the surface drainage waters. Thus, percolating water stimulates weathering reactions and helps differentiate soil horizons.

Likewise, a deficiency of water is a major factor in determining the characteristics of soils of dry regions. Soluble salts are not leached from these soils, and in some cases they build up to levels that curtail plant and microbial growth. Soil profiles in arid and semi-arid regions are also apt to accumulate carbonates and certain types of expansive clays (calcrete or caliche horizons). In tropical soils, when the soil has been deprived of vegetation (e.g. by deforestation) and thereby is submitted to intense evaporation, the upward capillary movement of water, which has dissolved iron and aluminium salts, is responsible for the formation of a superficial hardpan of laterite or bauxite, respectively, which is improper for cultivation, a known case of irreversible soil degradation.

The direct influences of climate include:

- A shallow accumulation of lime in low rainfall areas as caliche
- Formation of acid soils in humid areas
- Erosion of soils on steep hillsides
- Deposition of eroded materials downstream
- Very intense chemical weathering, leaching, and erosion in warm and humid regions where soil does not freeze

Climate directly affects the rate of weathering and leaching. Wind moves sand and smaller particles (dust), especially in arid regions where there is little plant cover, depositing it close to or far from the entrainment source. The type and amount of precipitation influence soil formation by affecting the movement of ions and particles through the soil, and aid in the development of different soil profiles. Soil profiles are more distinct in wet and cool climates, where organic materials may accumulate, than in wet and warm climates, where organic materials are rapidly consumed. The effectiveness of water in weathering parent rock material depends on seasonal and daily temperature fluctuations, which favour tensile stresses in rock minerals, and thus their mechanical disaggregation, a process called thermal fatigue. By the same process freeze-thaw cycles are an effective mechanism which breaks up rocks and other consolidated materials.

=== Topography ===
The topography, or relief, is characterized by the inclination (slope), elevation, and orientation of the terrain (aspect). Topography determines the rate of precipitation or runoff and the rate of formation or erosion of the surface soil profile. The topographical setting may either hasten or retard the work of climatic forces.

Steep slopes encourage rapid soil loss by erosion and allow less rainfall to enter the soil before running off and hence, little mineral deposition in lower profiles (illuviation). In semiarid regions, the lower effective rainfall on steeper slopes also results in less complete vegetative cover, so there is less plant contribution to soil formation. For all of these reasons, steep slopes prevent the formation of soil from getting very far ahead of soil destruction. Therefore, soils on steep terrain tend to have rather shallow, poorly developed profiles in comparison to soils on nearby, more level sites.

Topography determines exposure to weather, fire, and other forces of man and nature. Mineral accumulations, plant nutrients, type of vegetation, vegetation growth, erosion, and water drainage are dependent on topographic relief. Soils at the bottom of a hill will get more water than soils on the slopes, and soils on the slopes that face the sun's path (south aspect) will be drier than soils on slopes that do not.

In swales and depressions where runoff water tends to concentrate, the regolith is usually more deeply weathered, and soil profile development is more advanced. However, in the lowest landscape positions, water may saturate the regolith to such a degree that drainage and aeration are restricted. Here, the weathering of some minerals and the decomposition of organic matter are retarded, while the loss of iron and manganese is accelerated. In such low-lying topography, special profile features characteristic of wetland soils may develop. Depressions allow the accumulation of water, minerals and organic matter, and in the extreme, the resulting soils will be saline marshes or peat bogs.

Recurring patterns of topography result in toposequences or soil catenas. These patterns emerge from topographic differences in erosion, deposition, fertility, soil moisture, plant cover, soil biology, fire history, and exposure to the elements. Gravity transports water downslope, together with mineral and organic solutes and colloids, increasing particulate and base content at the foot of hills and mountains. However, many other factors like drainage and erosion interact with slope position, blurring its expected influence on crop yield.

=== Organisms ===
Each soil has a unique combination of microbial, plant, animal and human influences acting upon it. Microorganisms are particularly influential in the mineral transformations critical to the soil forming process. Additionally, some bacteria can fix atmospheric nitrogen, and some fungi are efficient at extracting deep soil phosphorus and increasing soil carbon levels in the form of glomalin. Plants hold soil against erosion, and accumulated plant material build soil humus levels. Plant root exudation supports microbial activity. Animals serve to decompose plant materials and mix soil through bioturbation.

Soil is the most speciose (species-rich) ecosystem on Earth, but the vast majority of organisms in soil are microbes, a great many of which have not been described so far. There may be a microbial population limit of around one billion cells per gram of soil, but estimates of the number of species vary widely from 50,000 per gram to over a million per gram of soil. The number of organisms and species can vary widely according to soil type, location, and depth.

Plants, animals, fungi, bacteria and humans affect soil formation (see soil biomantle and stonelayer). Soil animals, including soil macrofauna (e.g. earthworms, termites, tenebrionids, gophers, moles) and mesofauna (e.g. enchytraeids, springtails, mites), mix soils as they form burrows and pores, allowing moisture and gases to move about, a process called bioturbation. In the same way, plant roots penetrate soil horizons and open channels upon decomposition. Plants with deep taproots can penetrate many metres through the different soil layers to bring up nutrients from deeper in the profile. Plants have fine roots that excrete organic compounds (sugars, organic acids, mucilage), slough off cells (in particular at their tip), and are easily decomposed, adding organic matter to soil, a process called rhizodeposition.

Microorganisms, including fungi and bacteria, effect chemical exchanges between roots and soil and act as a reserve of nutrients in a soil biological hotspot called rhizosphere. The growth of roots through the soil stimulates microbial populations, stimulating in turn the activity of their predators (notably amoeba and free-living nematodes), thereby increasing the mineralization rate, and in last turn root growth, a positive feedback called the soil microbial loop. Out of root influence, in the bulk soil most bacteria are in a quiescent stage, forming micro-aggregates, i.e. mucilaginous colonies to which clay particles are glued, offering them a protection against desiccation and predation by soil microfauna (bacteriophagous protozoa and nematodes). Microaggregates (20–250 μm) are ingested by soil fauna, and bacterial bodies are partly or totally digested in their guts.

Humans impact soil formation by removing vegetation cover through tillage, application of herbicides, fire, deforestation, and leaving soils bare. This can lead to erosion, waterlogging, lateritization or podzolization (according to climate and topography). Tillage mixes the different soil layers, restarting the soil formation process as less weathered material is mixed with the more developed upper layers, resulting in net increased rate of mineral weathering.

Earthworms, ants, termites, moles, gophers, as well as some millipedes and tenebrionid beetles, mix the soil as they burrow, significantly affecting soil formation. Earthworms ingest soil particles and organic residues, enhancing the availability of plant nutrients in the material that passes through their bodies. They aerate and stir the soil and create stable soil aggregates, after having disrupted links between soil particles during the intestinal transit of ingested soil, thereby assuring ready infiltration of water. As ants and termites build mounds, earthworms transport soil materials from one horizon to another. Other important functions are fulfilled by earthworms in the soil ecosystem, in particular their intense mucus production, both within the intestine and as a lining in their galleries (burrows), exert a priming effect on soil microflora, giving them the status of ecosystem engineers, which they share with ants and termites.

In general, the mixing of the soil by the activities of animals, sometimes called pedoturbation, tends to undo or counteract the tendency of other soil-forming processes that create distinct horizons. Termites and ants may also retard soil profile development by denuding large areas of soil around their nests, leading to increased loss of soil by erosion, the same for the deposition of casts at the soil surface by earthworms. Large animals such as gophers, moles, and prairie dogs bore into the lower soil horizons, bringing materials to the surface. Their tunnels are often open to the surface, encouraging the movement of water and air into the subsurface layers. In localized areas, they enhance mixing of the lower and upper horizons by creating and later refilling the tunnels. Old animal burrows in the lower horizons often become filled with soil material from the overlying A horizon, creating profile features known as crotovinas or krotovinas.

Vegetation impacts soils in numerous ways. It can prevent erosion caused by excessive rain that might result from surface runoff. Plants shade soils, keeping them cooler and slowing evaporation of soil moisture. Conversely, by way of transpiration, plants can cause soils to lose moisture, resulting in complex and highly variable relationships between leaf area index (measuring light interception) and moisture loss: more generally plants prevent soil from desiccation during driest months while they dry it during moister months, thereby acting as a buffer against strong moisture variation. Plants can form new chemicals that can break down minerals, both directly and indirectly through mycorrhizal fungi and rhizosphere bacteria, and improve the soil structure. The type and amount of vegetation depend on climate, topography, soil characteristics and biological factors, mediated or not by human activities. Soil factors such as density, depth, chemistry, pH, temperature and moisture greatly affect the type of plants that can grow in a given location. Dead plants and fallen leaves and stems begin their decomposition on the soil surface. There, organisms feed on them and mix the organic material with the upper soil layers; these added organic compounds become part of the soil formation process.

The influence of humans, and by association, fire, are state factors placed within the organisms state factor. Humans can import or extract nutrients and energy in ways that dramatically change soil formation. Accelerated soil erosion from overgrazing, and Pre-Columbian terraforming in the Amazon basin resulting in terra preta are two examples of the effects of human management.

It is believed that Native Americans regularly set fires to maintain several large areas of prairie grasslands in Indiana and Michigan, although climate and mammalian grazers (e.g. bisons) are also advocated to explain the maintenance of the Great Plains of North America. In more recent times, human destruction of natural vegetation and subsequent tillage of the soil for crop production has abruptly modified soil formation. Likewise, irrigating soil in an arid region drastically influences soil-forming factors, as does adding fertilizer and lime to soils of low fertility.

Distinct ecosystems produce distinct soils, sometimes in easily observable ways. For example, three species of land snails in the genus Euchondrus in the Negev desert are noted for eating lichens growing under the surface limestone rocks and slabs (endolithic lichens). The grazing activity of these ecosystem engineers disrupts the limestone, resulting in the weathering and the subsequent formation of soil. They have a significant effect on the region: the population of snails is estimated to process between 0.7 and 1.1 metric ton per hectare per year of limestone in the Negev desert.

The effects of ancient ecosystems are not as easily observed, and this challenges the understanding of soil formation. For example, the chernozems of the North American tallgrass prairie have a humus fraction nearly half of which is charcoal. This outcome was not anticipated because the antecedent prairie fires capable of producing these distinct deep rich black soils are not easily observed. It is now accepted that Neolithic human-caused wildfires enriched soils in charcoal (also called black carbon) and played a prominent role in the formation of the fertile chernozems and terra preta, actively used for the sake of agriculture.

It has been questioned whether soil formation can take place in the absence of organisms. Some researchers considered that life was not a prerequisite, taking as an example Martian soils, while others considered that these 'soils' were in fact regoliths.

=== Time ===
Time is a factor in the interactions of all the above. While a mixture of sand, silt and clay constitute the texture of a soil and the aggregation of those components produces peds, the development of a distinct B horizon marks the development of a soil or pedogenesis. With time, soils will evolve features that depend on the interplay of the prior listed soil-forming factors. It takes decades to several thousand years for a soil to develop a profile, although the notion of soil development has been criticized, soil being in a constant state-of-change under the influence of fluctuating soil-forming factors. That time period depends strongly on climate, parent material, relief, and biotic activity. For example, recently deposited material from a flood exhibits no soil development as there has not been enough time for the material to form a structure that further defines soil. The original soil surface is buried, and the formation process must begin anew for this deposit. Over time the soil will develop a profile that depends on the intensities of biota and climate. While a soil can achieve relative stability of its properties for extended periods, the soil life cycle ultimately ends in soil conditions that leave it vulnerable to erosion. Despite the inevitability of soil retrogression and degradation, most soil cycles are long.

Soil-forming factors continue to affect soils during their existence, even on stable landscapes that are long-enduring, some for millions of years. Materials are deposited on top or are blown or washed from the surface. With additions, removals and alterations, soils are always subject to new conditions. Whether these are slow or rapid changes depends on climate, topography and biological activity.

Time as a soil-forming factor may be investigated by studying soil chronosequences, in which soils of different ages but with minor differences in other soil-forming factors can be compared. Paleosols are soils formed during previous soil-forming conditions which can be deduced from comparisons with present-day soil development.

== History of research ==
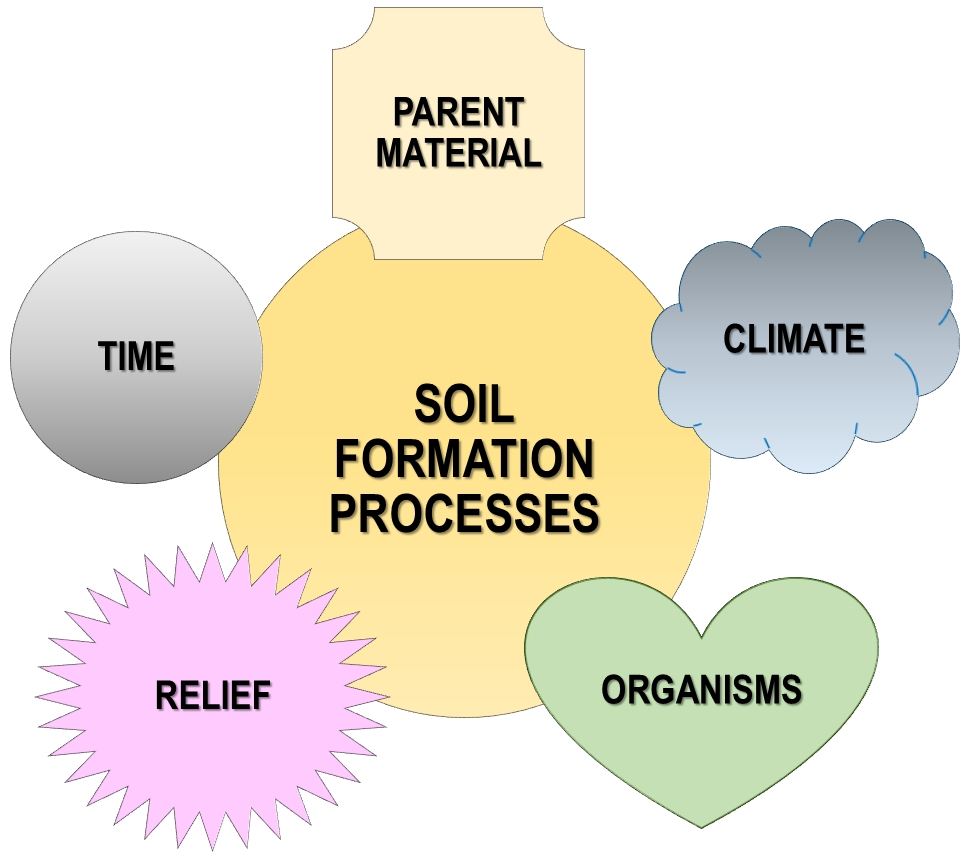
Five factors of soil formation

=== Dokuchaev's equation ===
Russian geologist Vasily Dokuchaev, commonly regarded as the father of pedology, determined in 1883 that soil formation occurs over time under the influence of climate, vegetation, topography, and parent material. He demonstrated this in 1898 using the soil forming equation:

soil = f(cl, o, p) t_{r}

(where cl or c = climate, o = biological processes, p = parent material) t_{r} = relative time (young, mature, old)

=== Hans Jenny's state equation ===
American soil scientist Hans Jenny published in 1941 a state equation for the factors influencing soil formation:

S = f(cl, o, r, p, t, ...)

- S soil formation
- cl (sometimes c) climate
- o organisms (soil microbiology, soil mesofauna, soil biology)
- r relief
- p parent material
- t time

This is often remembered with the mnemonic Clorpt.

Jenny's state equation in Factors of Soil Formation differs from Vasily Dokuchaev's equation, treating time (t) as a factor, adding topographic relief (r), and pointedly leaving the ellipsis open for more factors (state variables) to be added as our understanding becomes more refined.

There are two principal methods by which the state equation may be solved: first in a theoretical or conceptual manner by logical deductions from certain premises, and second empirically by experimentation or field observation. The empirical method is still mostly employed today, and soil formation can be defined by varying a single factor and keeping the other factors constant. This had led to the development of empirical models to describe pedogenesis, such as climofunctions, biofunctions, topofunctions, lithofunctions, and chronofunctions. Since Jenny published his formulation in 1941, it has been used by innumerable soil surveyors all over the world as a qualitative list for understanding the factors that may be important for producing the soil pattern within a region.

== Example ==
An example of the evolution of soils in prehistoric lake beds is in the Makgadikgadi Pans of the Kalahari Desert, where a change in an ancient river course led to millennia of salinity buildup and formation of calcretes and silcretes.
