= Bulk soil =

Soil type

Bulk soil is the soil outside of the rhizosphere that is not penetrated by plant roots. The bulk soil is like an ecosystem, it is made up of many things such as: nutrients, ions, soil particles, and root exudates. There are many different interactions that occur between all the members of the bulk soil. Natural organic compounds are much lower in bulk soil than in the rhizosphere. Furthermore, bulk soil inhabitants are generally smaller than identical species in the rhizosphere. The main two aspects of bulk soil are its chemistry and microbial community composition.

== Formation and composition of bulk soil ==
Soil is made up of layers called soil horizons, these make up a vertical soil profile. There are five master horizons O, A, E, B, and C. The O horizon contains organic matter, A is considered the topsoil, E is present or absent depending on the type of soil and conditions, B is the subsoil, and C is the soil parent material. Mineral soil is composed of sand, silt, and clay particles. Soil formation occurs as a result of the 5 soil forming factors: climate, organisms, topography, parent material, and time.

== Chemistry of bulk soil ==
There are many chemical interactions and properties that are in all the soil. Chemical properties of the bulk soil are organic matter, soil organic carbon, nutrient content, cation-exchange capacity (CEC), free ions (cations or anions), pH, and base saturation, and organisms. These can impact many chemical processes such as nutrient cycling, soil formation, biological activity, and erosion. In terms of carbon cycling, bulk soil respiration is sensitive to fluctuations in temperature. Another property, pH, is affected by soil proximity to roots, causing a raised pH in acid soils close to plant roots. Changes in soil chemistry, such as through addition of nutrients or warming temperatures, can heavily influence the microbial community, especially in sandy soils.

== Microbial communities ==
Soil is composed of a diverse community of microbes such as: fungi, bacteria, archaea, viruses and microfauna. There are microbes in the bulk soil and the rhizosphere, the variation of microbes increases in the bulk soil and the abundance of microbes increases in the rhizosphere. Some microbes can form symbioses with plants that are beneficial or pathogenic. For example, mycorrhizal symbiosis, a symbiotic association between fungal hyphae and plant roots which promotes plant uptake of nutrients. All soil microbes have a special role in many soil processes such as soil formation, organic matter decomposition, and nutrient cycling. For example, there are microbes in the rhizosphere (on the plant) that can break down nitrogen, and microbes in the bulk soil can break down nitrogen as well. Both have different factors that affect this process. Bulk soil tends to have smaller pores and greater moisture at a given matric potential than in the rhizosphere, affecting which microbes can survive there. The soil microbiome is constantly influenced by climate change and human land use, altering available nutrients and water, therefore altering microbial function.
