= Streptomyces zagrosensis =

Scientific classification
- Domain: Bacteria
- Kingdom: Bacillati
- Phylum: Actinomycetota
- Class: Actinomycetia
- Order: Streptomycetales
- Family: Streptomycetaceae
- Genus: Streptomyces
- Species: S. zagrosensis

Binomial name
- Streptomyces zagrosensis Mohammadipanah et al. 2014

Type strain
- CECT 8305, UTMC 1154, HM 1154

Species of bacterium

Streptomyces zagrosensis is a bacterium species from the genus of Streptomyces which has been isolated from rhizospheric soil in the Fars province in Iran.

== See also ==
- List of Streptomyces species
