= Streptomyces thinghirensis =

Scientific classification
- Domain: Bacteria
- Kingdom: Bacillati
- Phylum: Actinomycetota
- Class: Actinomycetes
- Order: Streptomycetales
- Family: Streptomycetaceae
- Genus: Streptomyces
- Species: S. thinghirensis

Binomial name
- Streptomyces thinghirensis Loqman et al. 2009

Type strain
- CCMM B35, CCMM/FSSM mic A n°20, DSM 41919, LMG 21089, Ouhdouch mic A 20, R-10424, S10

Synonyms
- Streptomyces thinghiriensis

Species of bacterium

Streptomyces thinghirensis is a bacterium species from the genus of Streptomyces which has been isolated from rhizosphere soil from the grape plant Vitis vinifera in Thinghir in Morocco.

== See also ==
- List of Streptomyces species
