= Streptomyces caeruleatus =

Scientific classification
- Domain: Bacteria
- Kingdom: Bacillati
- Phylum: Actinomycetota
- Class: Actinomycetes
- Order: Streptomycetales
- Family: Streptomycetaceae
- Genus: Streptomyces
- Species: S. caeruleatus

Binomial name
- Streptomyces caeruleatus Zhu et al. 2011

Type strain
- CCTCC M 208213, NRRL B-24802, GIMN4.002

Species of bacterium

Streptomyces caeruleatus is a bacterium species from the genus of Streptomyces which has been isolated from rhizosphere soil from a tomato plant in Guangzhou in China.

== See also ==
- List of Streptomyces species
