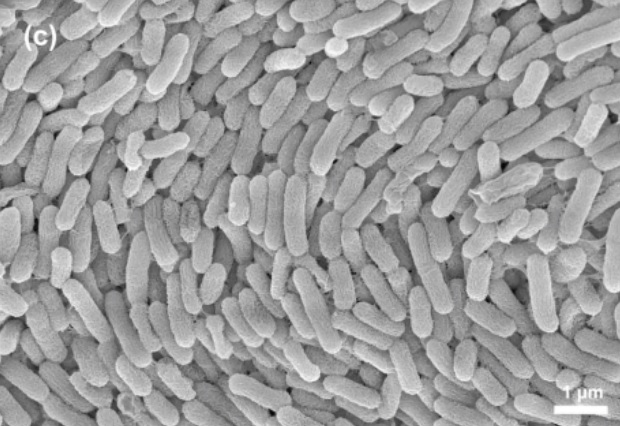

Scientific classification
- Domain: Bacteria
- Kingdom: Pseudomonadati
- Phylum: Pseudomonadota
- Class: Betaproteobacteria
- Order: Burkholderiales
- Family: Oxalobacteraceae
- Genus: Duganella
- Species: D. radicis

Binomial name
- Duganella radicis Madhaiyan et al.

Type strain
- Sac-41T = KCTC 22382T = NCIMB 14476T

= Duganella radicis =

Species of bacterium

Duganella radicis is a bacterium from the genus Duganella in the family Oxalobacteraceae which was isolated with Duganella sacchari from the rhizosphere of field-grown sugarcane.
