= Streptomyces marokkonensis =

Scientific classification
- Domain: Bacteria
- Kingdom: Bacillati
- Phylum: Actinomycetota
- Class: Actinomycetes
- Order: Streptomycetales
- Family: Streptomycetaceae
- Genus: Streptomyces
- Species: S. marinus

Binomial name
- Streptomyces marinus Bouizgarne et al. 2009

Type strain
- Bouizgarne Ap1, CCMM 2001, DSM 41918, JCM 17027, Lanoot R-22003, LMG 23016, Ouhdouch MM 2001, R-22003

Species of bacterium

Streptomyces marokkonensis is a bacterium species from the genus of Streptomyces which has been isolated from the rhizosphere soil of the tree Argania spinosa in Morocco.

== See also ==
- List of Streptomyces species
