= Streptomyces gramineus =

Scientific classification
- Domain: Bacteria
- Kingdom: Bacillati
- Phylum: Actinomycetota
- Class: Actinomycetia
- Order: Streptomycetales
- Family: Streptomycetaceae
- Genus: Streptomyces
- Species: S. gramineus

Binomial name
- Streptomyces gramineus Lee et al. 2012

Type strain
- KACC 15079, NBRC 107863, JR-43

Species of bacterium

Streptomyces gramineus is a bacterium species from the genus of Streptomyces which has been isolated from the rhizosphere soil of the plant Sasa borealis.

== See also ==
- List of Streptomyces species
