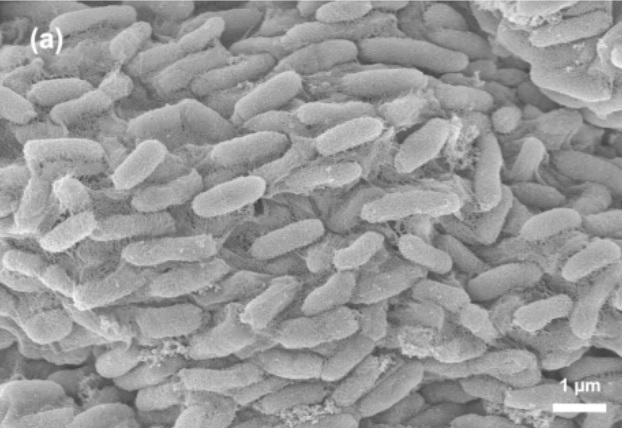

Scientific classification
- Domain: Bacteria
- Kingdom: Pseudomonadati
- Phylum: Pseudomonadota
- Class: Betaproteobacteria
- Order: Burkholderiales
- Family: Oxalobacteraceae
- Genus: Duganella
- Species: D. sacchari

Binomial name
- Duganella sacchari Madhaiyan et al. 2013

Type strain
- Sac-22T = KCTC 22381T = NCIMB 14475T

= Duganella sacchari =

Species of bacterium

Duganella sacchari is a bacterium of the genus Duganella in the family Oxalobacteraceae which was isolated with Duganella radicis from the rhizosphere of field-grown sugarcane.
