= Streptomyces triticirhizae =

Scientific classification
- Domain: Bacteria
- Kingdom: Bacillati
- Phylum: Actinomycetota
- Class: Actinomycetia
- Order: Streptomycetales
- Family: Streptomycetaceae
- Genus: Streptomyces
- Species: S. triticirhizae

Binomial name
- Streptomyces triticirhizae Han et al. 2020

Type strain
- NEAU-YY642

Species of bacterium

Streptomyces triticirhizae is a bacterium species from the genus of Streptomyces which has been isolated from rhizosphereic soil.

== See also ==
- List of Streptomyces species
