= Streptomyces lacticiproducens =

Scientific classification
- Domain: Bacteria
- Kingdom: Bacillati
- Phylum: Actinomycetota
- Class: Actinomycetia
- Order: Streptomycetales
- Family: Streptomycetaceae
- Genus: Streptomyces
- Species: S. lacticiproducens

Binomial name
- Streptomyces lacticiproducens Zhu et al. 2011

Type strain
- CCTCC M208214, NRRL B-24800, GIMN4.001

Species of bacterium

Streptomyces lacticiproducens is a bacterium species from the genus of Streptomyces which has been isolated from the rhizosphere of a tomato plant in Guangzhou in China. Streptomyces lacticiproducens produces lactic acid.

== See also ==
- List of Streptomyces species
