= Streptomyces oryziradicis =

Scientific classification
- Domain: Bacteria
- Kingdom: Bacillati
- Phylum: Actinomycetota
- Class: Actinomycetia
- Order: Streptomycetales
- Family: Streptomycetaceae
- Genus: Streptomyces
- Species: S. oryziradicis

Binomial name
- Streptomyces oryziradicis Li et al. 2020

Type strain
- NEAU-C40

Species of bacterium

Streptomyces oryziradicis is a bacterium species from the genus of Streptomyces which has been isolated from rhizosphereic soil of a rice plant (Oryza sativa L.) from the Northeast Agricultural University in Harbin in China.

== See also ==
- List of Streptomyces species
