= Basidiospore =

Reproductive structure of a fungus

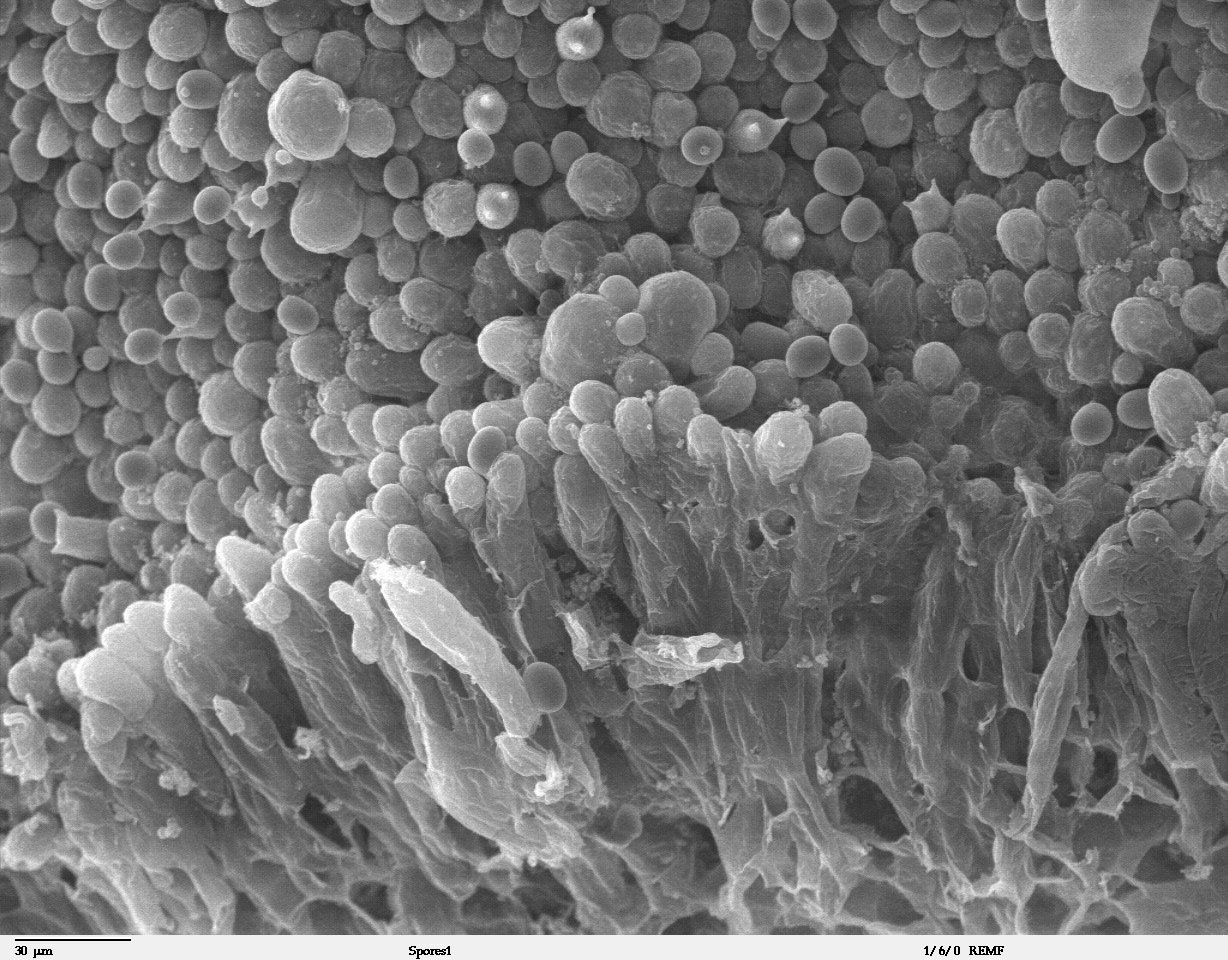
Agaricus bisporus basidiospores

A basidiospore is a reproductive spore produced by basidiomycete fungi, a grouping that includes mushrooms, shelf fungi, rusts, and smuts. Basidiospores typically each contain one haploid nucleus that is the product of meiosis, and they are produced by specialized fungal cells called basidia. Typically, four basidiospores develop on appendages from each basidium, of which two are of one strain and the other two of its opposite strain. In gills under a cap of one common species, there exist millions of basidia.

Some gilled mushrooms in the order Agaricales have the ability to release billions of spores. The puffball fungus Calvatia gigantea has been calculated to produce about five trillion basidiospores. Most basidiospores are forcibly discharged, and are thus considered ballistospores. These spores serve as the main air dispersal units for the fungi. The spores are released during periods of high humidity and generally have a night-time or pre-dawn peak concentration in the atmosphere.

When basidiospores encounter a favorable substrate, they may germinate, typically by forming hyphae. These hyphae grow outward from the original spore, forming an expanding circle of mycelium. The circular shape of a fungal colony explains the formation of fairy rings, and also the circular lesions of skin-infecting fungi that cause ringworm. Some basidiospores germinate repetitively by forming small spores instead of hyphae.

== Structure ==
Basidiospores are generally characterized by an attachment peg (called a hilar appendage) on its surface. This is where the spore was attached to the basidium. The hilar appendage is quite prominent in some basidiospores, but less evident in others. An apical germ pore may also be present. The surface of the spore can be fairly smooth, or it can be ornamented.

The spore wall consists of several layers, from innermost to outermost: the endosporium, episporium, and the ectosporium. These layers are typical for colourless basidiospores. The episporium is made out of interwoven chitin and glucan microfibrils. The ectosporium becomes sticky and slimy in mature spores and is quite thin. The color of the spore print is usually found in a part of the spore wall called the exosporium although in rare instances – like the yellow spores of Clavaria helicoides – the cytoplasm is responsible for the spore color. Coloured spores also have another additional layer called the perisporium, which may be amyloid (contain starches that react with iodine).

=== Size ===
The general range of basidiospore size is 5–10 microns long. However, some agaric basidiospores may be as small as 2 microns long. There are several factors that can influence the size of a basidiospore. One study found that among polypores, variations in spore size could be accounted for by nutritional modes, host trees, rot type and basidiocarp (fruiting body) size. Parasitic polypores produced larger spores than saprotrophic ones, and species that preferred deciduous trees generally produced larger spores than those colonizing conifers. Additionally, species with larger basidiocarps likewise produced larger spores. However, this correlation was only weakly found among agarics in another study. However, total basidiospore volume per basidium, is strongly correlated with basidium volume among all basidiomycetes.

=== Shape ===
Many basidiospores have an asymmetric shape due to their development on the basidium. Basidiospores are typically single-celled (without septa), and typically range from spherical to oval to oblong, to ellipsoid or cylindrical. The shape of the basidiospores are presumed to give certain advantages for dispersal. Spherical spores may be able to gain higher speeds, and insert themselves into objects, in comparison to narrow spores. Narrow spores, however, probably float better through the air, improving their ability to be dispersed by the wind.

=== Plages ===
A plage is a clear, unornamented area on the basal area of an otherwise ornamented basidiospore, next to its apiculus. It is also called a hilar depression. It plays an important role in the spore release of agarics, where it provides a place for water (called the adaxial drop) to condense on before the water merges with Buller's drop on the hilar appendix. It is characteristic of spores from the euagaric genus Galerina. It was first described by French mycologist Robert Kühner in 1926.

Plages are quite variable between different basidiomycetes. Rather than simply a flat area above hilar appendix, some fungi have a dimple. This is called a suprahilar depression. These variations may happen because of structural differences in the gills or pores of different species, as they need different volumes of water, to disperse the spore.

There are four types of plages, based on how they react to Melzer's reagant. If the plage turns blue or black in reaction to Melzer's reagant, it can be classified as an amyloid plage. If it does not change colour, it is called an inamyloid plage. If the colour shows up only in the center, it is called centrally amyloid, respectively, if it shows up only on the outer edges of the plage, it is called distally amyloid. These characteristics can be useful in distinguishing between Lactarius species.

== Development ==
Basidiospores develop from basidia, reproductive structures found on the gills, spines, tubes or surfaces (depending on species) of basidiomycetes. In smaller fungi, like basidiomycete yeasts, rusts or smuts, basidiospores are generated by single cells, or germinating spores. These basidia are formed through the karyogomy of the two haploid nuclei into one diploid nucleus in the terminal cell of a fungus. Following karyogomy, the nuclei in the basidia go through meiosis, and migrate into typically 4 (though the number can range from 1–8) buds attached to the basidia by stalks called strerigmata. These buds balloon as they are filled with cytoplasm from the basidia, and differentiate into basidiospores.

== Dispersal ==
Basidiospores can be dispersed actively (through a fungus's own mechanisms) or passively (through reliance on another organism or abiotic factor). Actively dispersed basidiospores are also called ballistospores. They are discharged through water being condensed near the base (basidium facing) part of the spore, called the apiculus. This droplet, called Buller's drop, grows and in rapid sequence, fuses with the meniscus of water around the top of the spore. This causes the centre of gravity to shift dramatically, causing the spore to break off of the sterigma. Basidiospores excrete sugars like glucose and fructose, as well as mannitol near their apiculus to create a focal point on its surface to condense water from the atmosphere. This sequence of events leads spores being shot 0.1–0.2 mm (0.0039–0.0079 in) into the free space between the mushroom's gills or pores, allowing them to fall down out of the cap. Yeast spores can even reach up to 1 mm (0.039 in) away from their substrate through this mechanism alone.

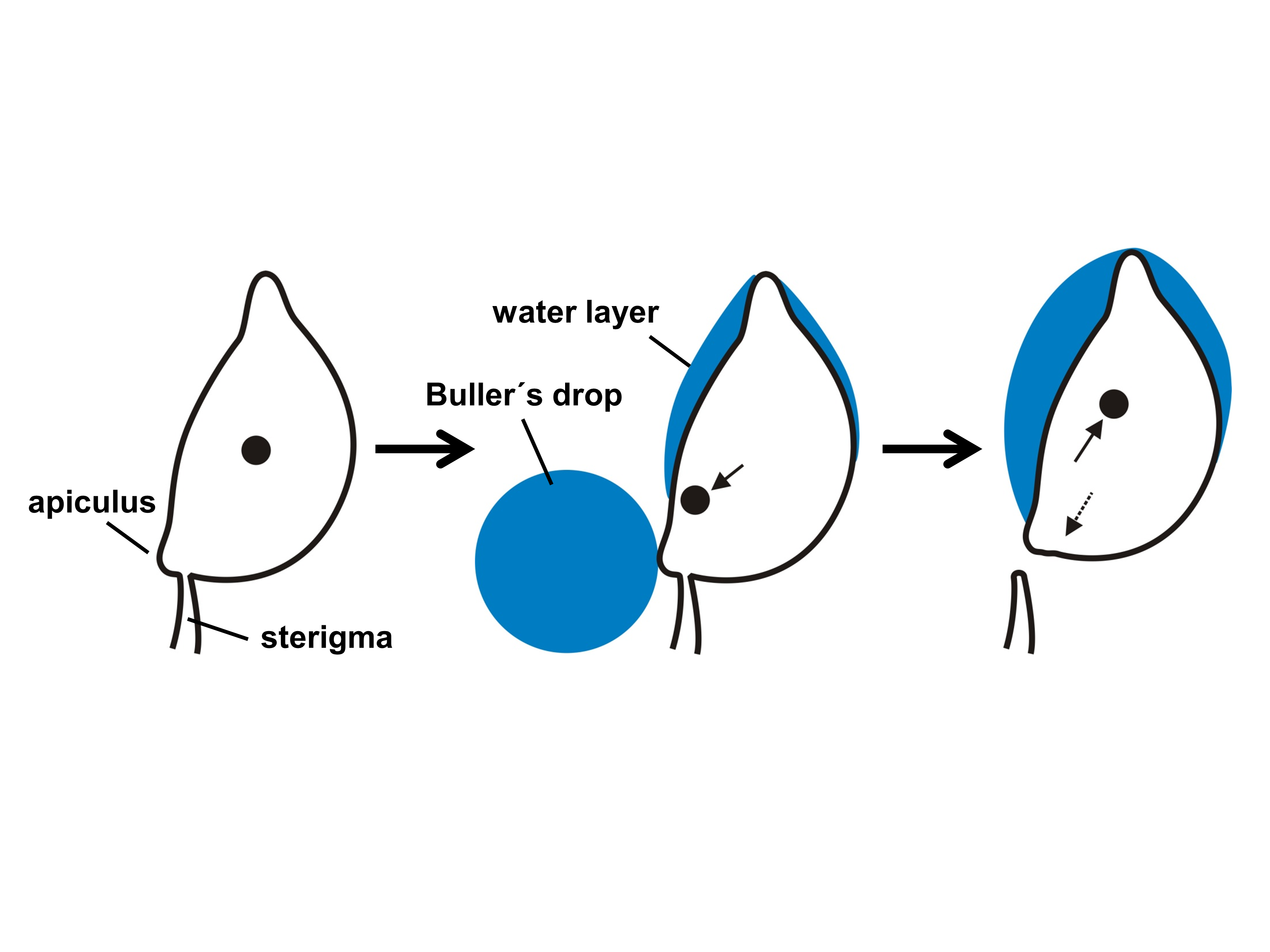
Active dispersal of a basidiospore

Passive dispersal uses environmental vectors such as wind, water or animals. Wind dispersal is the most common method of passive basidiospore dispersal of agarics. The shape of the stipe and cap of the fungi are adaptive for the optimal dispersal of basidiospore. For example, bell-shaped caps can prevent spores from being blown back to the hymenium, when the wind turbulence is strong. Taller stipes, and smaller basidiospores allow the basidiospores travel farther. To overcome still air, some fungi create their own draft, by evaporating water which causes differences in air temperature beneath the hymenium.

Basidiospore dispersal by water can occur through rain or mist. For example, in bird's nest fungi, raindrops help carry peridioles (small aggregates of basidiospores) out of the peridium (cup-like structure). Puffballs and earthballs rely on the pressure of raindrops, to compress the air inside the peridium to trigger the release of basidiospores through its apical hole.

Basidiospore dispersal through animals can happen through ingestion of the mushroom, or adherence of the spores to skin or fur. Animals that consume mushrooms range from slugs, to insects and small mammals. Basidiospores dispersed through ingestion, must have thick walls to survive the digestive process. Basidiospores of ectomycorrhizal often get transported through attaching to the cuticle of arthropods.

Additionally, the basidiospores themselves can have characteristics that facilitate them landing in favourable conditions. For example, the rough spore surfaces of spores in the Russula genus, may improve attachment to a substrate. Basidiospores in Agaricus have melanin in the walls of their basidiospores which helps protect them against chemical, enzymic and light damage. Basidiospores can be categorised by whether they have characteristics that optimise dispersal or survival. Memnospores tend to be large, spherical, thick-walled and require specific environmental stimuli to germinate, which optimizes survival. Xenospores, tend to be small, thin-walled, oblong and ornamented, which optimizes dispersal.

== Germination ==
A large percent of basidiospores released by their parent do not make it to a suitable habitat and eventually die. Those that germinate usually form hyphae with uninucleate haploid cells, the first of which is called a germ tube. However, basidiospores of some species may enter a yeast phase, develop into microconidia, or release secondary ballistospores. The optimal conditions for germination vary greatly among different species of basidomycetes. However, presence of liquid water, oxygen and carbon dioxide are universal requirements. Some basidiospores wait for chemical cues like exudates of plant roots, microorganisms, dead organic materials or mycelium of the same species to germinate.

== Ecology and environment ==
One cubic meter of air in temperate climates typically contains 1,000-10,000 fungal spores, a majority of which are basidiospores.
