= Streptomyces bambusae =

Scientific classification
- Domain: Bacteria
- Kingdom: Bacillati
- Phylum: Actinomycetota
- Class: Actinomycetia
- Order: Streptomycetales
- Family: Streptomycetaceae
- Genus: Streptomyces
- Species: S. bambusae

Binomial name
- Streptomyces bambusae Nguyen and Kim et al. 2016

Type strain
- KACC 18225, KEMB 9005-214, NBRC 110903, T110

Species of bacterium

Streptomyces bambusae is a bacterium species from the genus of Streptomyces which has been isolated from rhizosphere soil from bamboos on Korea. Streptomyces bambusae has antifungal and antibacterial activities.

== See also ==
- List of Streptomyces species
