= Streptomyces rhizosphaericola =

Scientific classification
- Domain: Bacteria
- Kingdom: Bacillati
- Phylum: Actinomycetota
- Class: Actinomycetia
- Order: Streptomycetales
- Family: Streptomycetaceae
- Genus: Streptomyces
- Species: S. rhizosphaericola

Binomial name
- Streptomyces rhizosphaericola Vargas Hoyos et al. 2019

Type strain
- 1AS2c

Species of bacterium

Streptomyces rhizosphaericola is a bacterium species from the genus Streptomyces which has been isolated from wheat rhizosphere.
