= Streptomyces iranensis =

Scientific classification
- Domain: Bacteria
- Kingdom: Bacillati
- Phylum: Actinomycetota
- Class: Actinomycetes
- Order: Streptomycetales
- Family: Streptomycetaceae
- Genus: Streptomyces
- Species: S. iranensis

Binomial name
- Streptomyces iranensis Hamedi et al. 2010

Type strain
- CCUG 57623, DSM 41954, HM 35, JCM 17327

Species of bacterium

Streptomyces iranensis is a bacterium species from the genus of Streptomyces which has been isolated from rhizospherical soil in Isfahan in Iran.

== See also ==
- List of Streptomyces species
