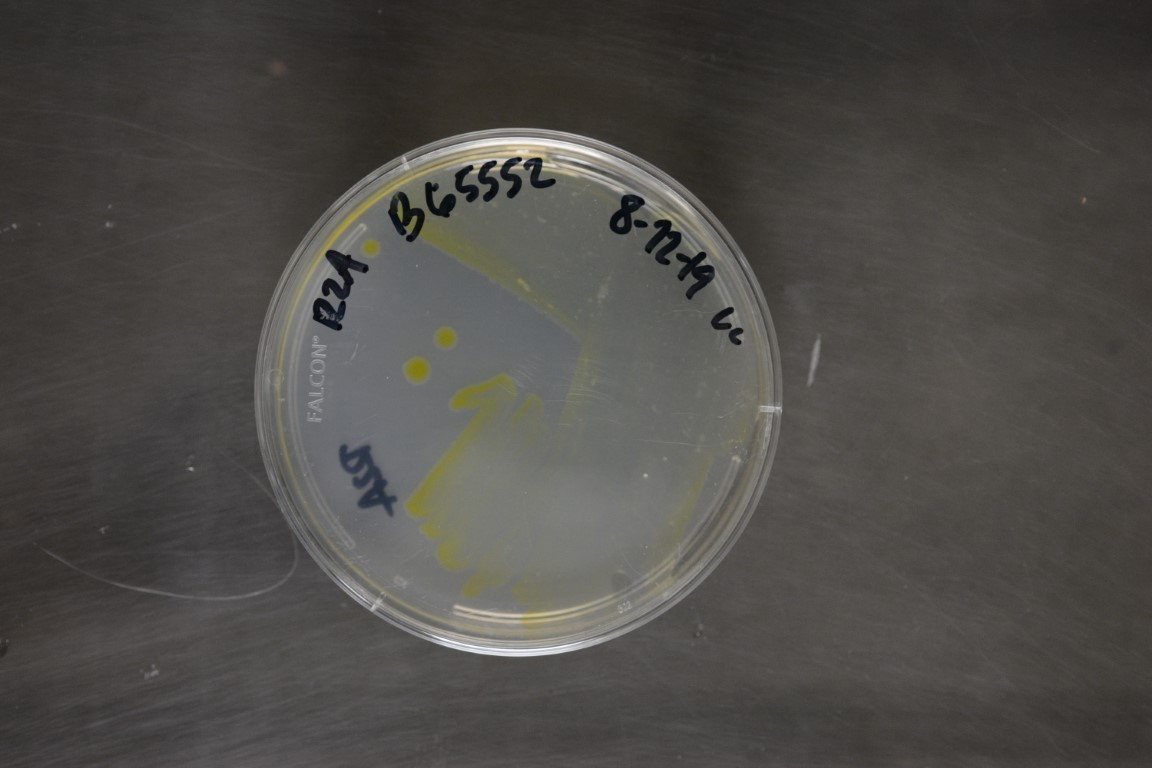
- Duganella callida on agar plate

Scientific classification
- Domain: Bacteria
- Kingdom: Pseudomonadati
- Phylum: Pseudomonadota
- Class: Betaproteobacteria
- Order: Burkholderiales
- Family: Oxalobacteraceae
- Genus: Duganella; Hiraishi et al. 1997

Type species
- Duganella zoogloeoides

Species
- Duganella ginsengisoli Duganella phyllosphaerae Duganella radicis Duganella sacchari Duganella zoogloeoides

= Duganella =

Genus of bacteria

Duganella is a genus of bacteria in the family Oxalobacteraceae.

Duganella is named after the American microbiologist, P.R. Dugan, who first isolated the organism from sewage and polluted water. Duganella is in class Betaproteobacteria and order Burkholderiales. The molecular percent of Duganella's G/C content is 63–64. Morphological characteristics consist of: straight or slightly curved rods, and in liquid growth media, either colonies that are "occasionally fingerlike," appear, or dispersed growth with little or no formation of colonies appear. When grown on nutrient agar, the colonies are pale yellow to "straw-colored." Duganella is able to produce violacein, a vibrant purple compound derived from the condensation of two molecules of tryptophan that is known to be anti-tumor, anti-fungal, and anti-viral. Violacein producing bacterial strains have been isolated from many different environments, Duganella producing violacein strains have been isolated from agricultural and forest soils. Duganella is Gram negative, with cellular appendages of a single polar flagellum, making it motile. Duganella needs oxygen to survive. Duganellais mesophilic, neutrophilic, and chemoorganotrophic. Duganella zoogleoides display growth on nutrient or mineral media supplemented with simple organic compounds. Morphological characteristics include: glistening colonies, convex-shaped with entire margins, and are also pale yellow. The colonies appear to be dry and wrinkly, "leather-like."
