= Soil carbon =

Solid carbon stored in global soils

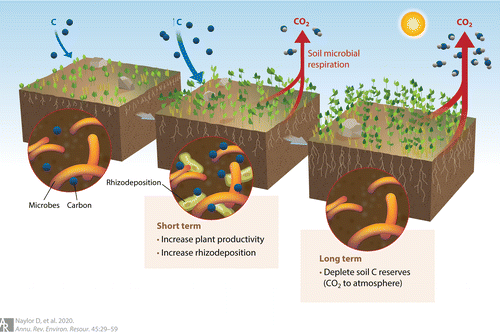
Impact of elevated CO_{2} on soil carbon reserves

Soil carbon is the solid carbon stored in global soils. This includes both soil organic matter, derived from plant, animal, and microbial tissues, and inorganic carbon as carbonate minerals. Soil carbon contributes to vital functions of soil in ecosystems, including water holding capacity, nutrient retention, and soil structure. Soil carbon is a carbon sink in the global carbon cycle, playing a role in biogeochemistry, climate change mitigation. As such, data on soil carbon quality and change is important to constructing global climate models. Microorganisms play an important role in breaking down carbon in the soil. Changes in their activity due to rising temperatures could possibly influence and even contribute to climate change. Anthropogenic factors have increasingly changed soil carbon distributions. Human activities have caused a massive loss of soil organic carbon; however, there is potential for human activity to intentionally divert carbon back to the soil. Globally, data on soil organic carbon is inconsistent, with some regions having far more comprehensive data than others.

== Overview ==
Soil carbon is present in two forms: inorganic and organic. Soil inorganic carbon consists of mineral forms of carbon, either from weathering of parent material, or from reaction of soil minerals with atmospheric CO_{2}. Carbonate minerals are the dominant form of soil carbon in desert climates. Soil organic carbon is present as soil organic matter. It includes relatively available carbon as fresh plant remains and relatively inert carbon in materials derived from plant remains: humus and charcoal. Soil carbon is critical for terrestrial organisms and is one of the most important carbon pools, with the majority of carbon stored in forests. Biotic factors include photosynthetic assimilation of fixed carbon, decomposition of biomass, and the activities of diverse communities of soil organisms. Climate, landscape dynamics, fires, and mineralogy are some of the important abiotic factors. For example, anthropogenic fires destroy the top layer of the soil, exposing soil to excessive oxidation. Industrial nitrogen fixation, agricultural practices, and land use and other management practices are some anthropogenic activities that have altered soil carbon.

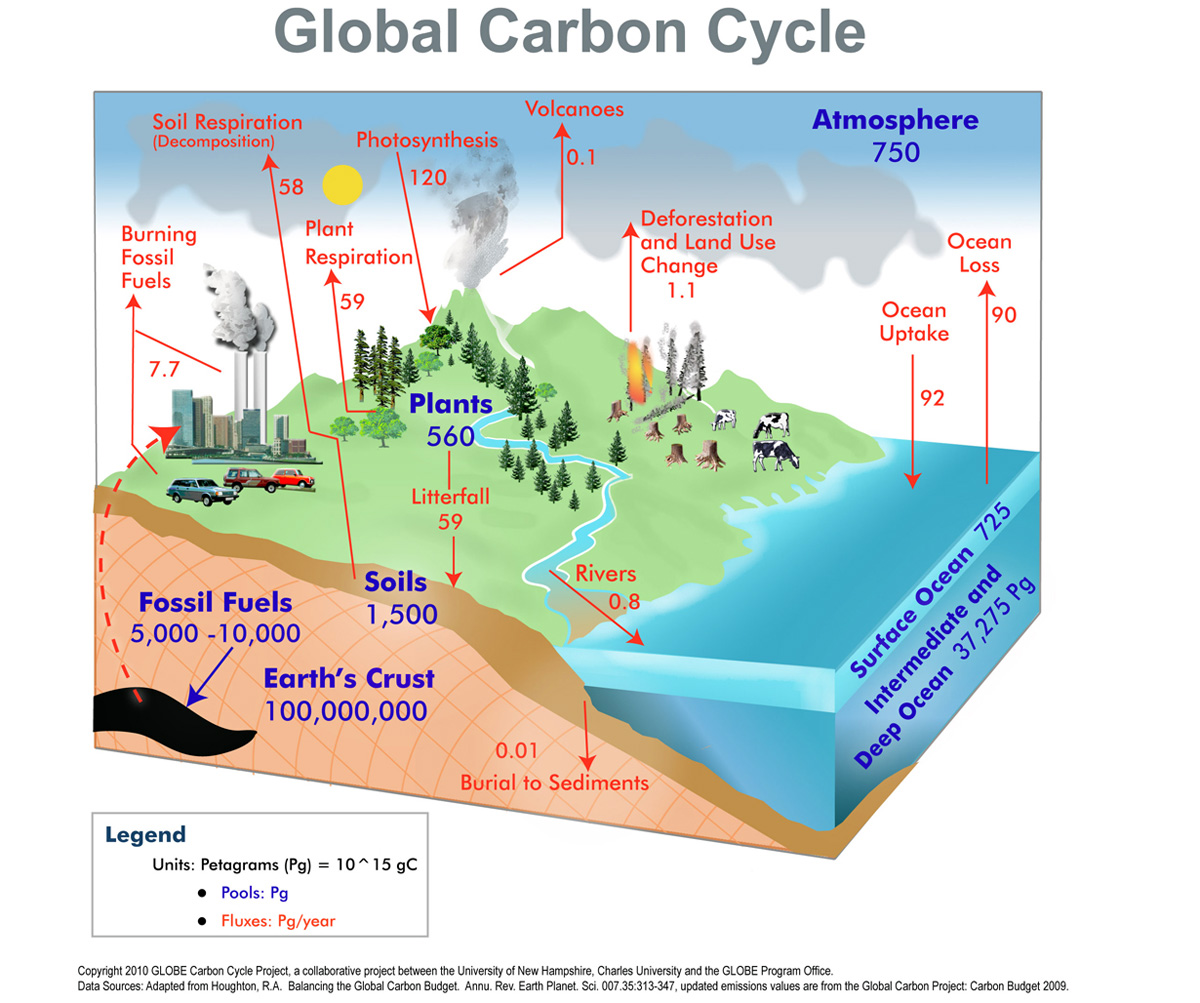
Global Carbon Cycle

== Global carbon cycle ==
Soil carbon distribution and accumulation arises from complex and dynamic processes, which are influenced by biotic, abiotic, and anthropogenic factors. While many environmental factors affect the total stored carbon in terrestrial ecosystems, photosynthesis, respiration, and decomposition are the main drivers in balancing the total amount of stored carbon on land. Atmospheric CO_{2} is taken up by photosynthetic organisms and stored as organic matter in terrestrial ecosystems. Microbes, fungi, plant roots, and other biota of the soil are consistently releasing some CO2 back into the atmosphere through respiration; additionally, microbes, and saprophytic fungi work to break down organic matter in the soil- some of which is released as carbon into the atmosphere, and some is retained as humus in the soil from microbial excrement. These natural processes form the basis of the carbon cycle.

Of the 2,700 Gt of carbon stored in soils worldwide, 1550 GtC is organic and 950 GtC is inorganic carbon, which is approximately three times greater than the current atmospheric carbon and 240 times higher compared with the current annual fossil fuel emission. The balance of soil carbon is held in peat and wetlands (150 GtC), and in plant litter at the soil surface (50 GtC). This compares to 780 GtC in the atmosphere, and 600 GtC in all living organisms. The oceanic pool of carbon accounts for 38,200 GtC.

About 60 GtC/yr accumulates in the soil. This 60 GtC/yr is the balance of 120 GtC/yr contracted from the atmosphere by terrestrial plant photosynthesis reduced by 60 GtC/yr of plant respiration. An equivalent 60 GtC/yr is respired from soil, joining the 60 GtC/yr plant respiration to return to the atmosphere.

== Forms of Carbon in Soil ==
=== Inorganic Carbon ===
In arid and semi-arid environments, a majority of soil carbon occurs in the form of inorganic carbonates, such as the minerals calcite and dolomite. Carbonates can originate from the bedrock or parent material from which the soil forms, or can form in situ as pedogenic carbonate.

=== Organic carbon ===
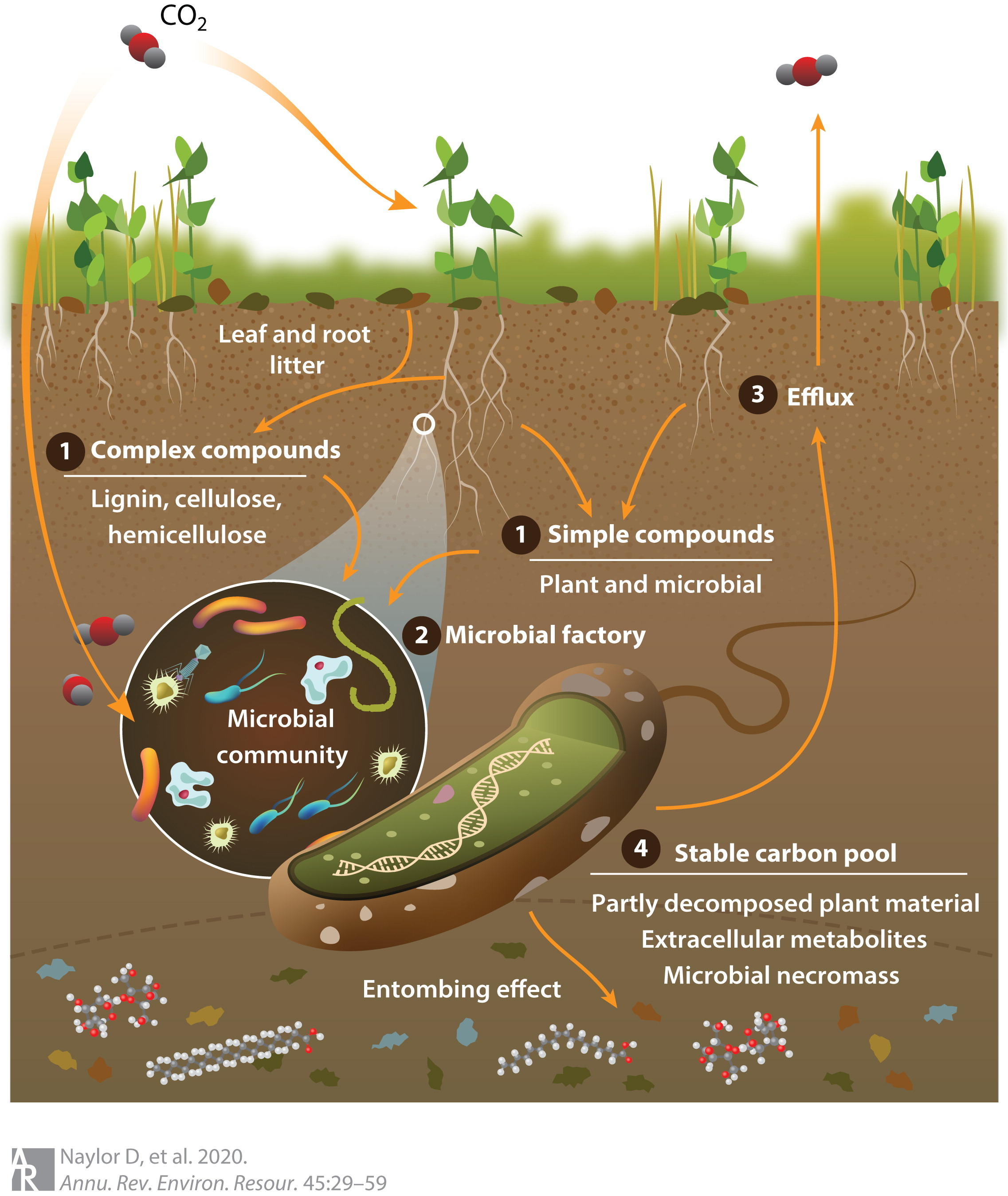
Soil carbon cycle through the microbial loop Carbon dioxide in the atmosphere is fixed by plants (or autotrophic microorganisms) and added to soil through processes such as (1) root exudation of low-molecular weight simple carbon compounds, or deposition of leaf and root litter leading to accumulation of complex plant polysaccharides. (2) Through these processes, carbon is made bioavailable to the microbial metabolic "factory" and subsequently is either (3) respired to the atmosphere or (4) enters the stable carbon pool as microbial necromass. The exact balance of carbon efflux versus persistence is a function of several factors, including aboveground plant community composition and root exudate profiles, environmental variables, and collective microbial phenotypes (i.e., the metaphenome).

In humid environments, the majority of soil carbon is organic. Soil organic carbon is part of soil organic matter, which contains approximately 50% carbon by dry weight, with the remaining mass made up primarily of hydrogen, oxygen, nitrogen, and sulfur. Detritus resulting from plant senescence is the major source of soil organic carbon, as organic matter is added to soil in the form of plant roots, fallen leaves, and crop residue. Some plant compounds, such as cellulose, starches, proteins, and lipids, are readily degraded by microbes, resulting in short residence times, while more persistent forms of organic C include lignin, humus, organic matter encapsulated in soil aggregates and charcoal. These resist alteration and have long residence times.

Root exudates are another source of soil carbon. 5–20% of the total carbon carbon fixed by plants during photosynthesis is supplied as root exudates in support of rhizospheric mutualistic biota. As exudates, plant roots feed carbon to mycorrhizal fungi in exchange for stored nutrients. Microbial populations are typically higher in the rhizosphere than in adjacent bulk soil.

Animal bodies and excreta also add organic matter, and thus carbon, to the soil. Within the soil, carbon is cycled extensively by microbes such that microbial necromass can make up 30 to 80% of the carbon in soil.

As organic substances are broken down, they form smaller molecules that can be physically or chemically stabilized in the soil. Chemically stabilized organic matter is known as mineral-associated organic matter (MAOM). MAOM is formed when organic compounds adhere to clay, iron oxide, or other mineral surfaces in the soil, making them more resistant to microbial degradation and loss from the soil carbon pool.

Soil organic carbon is divided between living soil biota and dead biotic material derived from biomass. Together these comprise the soil food web, with the living component sustained by the biotic material component. Soil biota includes earthworms, nematodes, protozoa, fungi, bacteria and different arthropods.

Soil organic carbon tends to be concentrated in the topsoil. Topsoil ranges from 0.5% to 3.0% organic carbon for most upland soils. Soils with less than 0.5% organic C are mostly limited to desert areas. Soils containing greater than 12–18% organic carbon are generally classified as organic soils. High levels of organic C develop in soils when organic matter additions are greater than losses, typically in areas with limited drainage such that water saturation prevents decomposition, including swamps, bogs, and marshes.

Fire derived forms of carbon are present in most soils as unweathered charcoal and weathered black carbon. Soil organic carbon is typically 5–50% derived from char, with levels above 50% encountered in mollisol, chernozem, and terra preta soils.

== Soil organic carbon and soil function ==
Organic carbon is vital to soil capacity to provide edaphic ecosystem services. The condition of this capacity is termed soil health, a term that communicates the value of understanding soil as a living system as opposed to an abiotic component. Specific carbon related benchmarks used to evaluate soil health include CO_{2} release, humus levels, and microbial metabolic activity.

Soil organic carbon concentrations in sandy soils influence soil bulk density which decreases with an increase in SOC. Bulk density is important for calculating SOC stocks. Soil organic carbon increased the cation exchange capacity (CEC), a measure of soil fertility, in sandy soils. SOC was higher in sandy soils with higher pH. found that up to 76% of the variation in CEC was caused by SOC, and up to 95% of variation in CEC was attributed to SOC and pH. Soil organic matter and specific surface area has been shown to account for 97% of variation in CEC whereas clay content accounts for 58%. Soil organic carbon increased with an increase in silt and clay content. The silt and clay size fractions have the ability to protect SOC in soil aggregates. When organic matter decomposes, the organic matter binds with silt and clay forming aggregates. Soil organic carbon is higher in silt and clay sized fractions than in sand sized fractions, and is generally highest in the clay sized fractions.

== Soil carbon and climate change ==
Climate change has significant impacts on soil formation, as temperature and moisture levels alter the development of chemical and physical properties in the soil. Therefore, changes in climate will likely impact the soil in many ways, including the fertility, salinity, moisture, temperature, SOC, sequestration, aggregation etc. Forest soils constitute a large pool of carbon. Anthropogenic activities such as deforestation cause releases of carbon from this pool, which may significantly increase the concentration of greenhouse gas (GHG) in the atmosphere. Scientists are exploring the complex relationships between climate and soil particulates.

Soil also has carbon sequestration abilities where carbon dioxide is fixed in the soil by plant uptakes. This accounts for the majority of the soil organic matter (SOM) in the ground, and creates a large storage pool (around 1500 Pg) for carbon in just the first few meters of soil and 20-40% of that organic carbon has a residence life exceeding 100 years. Researchers are interested in discovering ways that human intervention can adequately restore carbon to the soils, through farming and other practices.

=== Managing soil carbon ===
The exchange of carbon between soils and the atmosphere is a significant part of the global carbon cycle. Carbon, as it relates to the organic matter of soils, is a major component of soil and catchment health, or carbon sequestration. Several factors affect the variation that exists in soil organic matter and soil carbon; the most significant has, in contemporary times, been the influence of humans and agricultural systems.

Although exact quantities are difficult to measure, human activities have caused substantial losses of soil organic carbon through land use changes, such as deforestation and other agricultural practices. For example, the destruction of rainforests has resulted in a significant release of stored carbon from terrestrial ecosystems into the atmosphere as carbon dioxide (CO2). Also, fire removes soil cover and leads to immediate and continuing losses of soil organic carbon. Additionally, tillage and drainage both expose soil organic matter to oxygen and oxidation. In the Netherlands, East Anglia, Florida, and the California Delta, subsidence of peat lands from oxidation has been severe as a result of tillage and drainage. Grazing management that exposes soil (through either excessive or insufficient recovery periods) can also cause losses of soil organic carbon. It has long been encouraged that farmers adjust practices to maintain or increase the organic component in the soil. On one hand, practices that hasten oxidation of carbon (such as burning crop stubbles or over-cultivation) are discouraged; on the other hand, incorporation of organic material (such as in manuring) has been encouraged. Increasing soil carbon is not a straightforward matter; it is made complex by the relative activity of soil biota, which can consume and release carbon and are made more active by the addition of nitrogen fertilizers.

==== Carbon catchment health ====
Much of the contemporary literature on soil carbon relates to its role, or potential, as an atmospheric carbon sink to offset climate change. Despite this emphasis, a much wider range of soil and catchment health aspects are improved as soil carbon is increased. These benefits are difficult to quantify, due to the complexity of natural resource systems and the interpretation of what constitutes soil health; nonetheless, several benefits are proposed in the following points:

- Reduced erosion, sedimentation: increased soil aggregate stability means greater resistance to erosion; mass movement is less likely when soils are able to retain structural strength under greater moisture levels.
- Greater productivity: healthier and more productive soils can contribute to positive socio-economic circumstances.
- Cleaner waterways, nutrients and turbidity: nutrients and sediment tend to be retained by the soil rather than leach or wash off, and are so kept from waterways.
- Water balance: greater soil water holding capacity reduces overland flow and recharge to groundwater; the water saved and held by the soil remains available for use by plants.
- Climate change: Soils have the ability to retain carbon that may otherwise exist as atmospheric CO_{2} and contribute to global warming.
- Greater biodiversity: soil organic matter contributes to the health of soil flora and, accordingly, the natural links with biodiversity in the greater biosphere.

=== Measuring data on soil organic carbon ===
Under the United Nations Framework Convention on Climate Change (UNFCCC), countries must estimate and report GHG emissions and removals, including changes in carbon stocks in all five pools (above- and below-ground biomass, dead wood, litter, and soil carbon) and associated emissions and removals from land use, land-use change and forestry activities, according to the Intergovernmental Panel on Climate Change's good practice guidance. Tropical deforestation represents nearly 25% of total anthropogenic GHG emissions worldwide. Deforestation, forest degradation, and changes in land management practices can cause releases of carbon from soil to the atmosphere. For these reasons, reliable estimates of soil organic carbon stock and stock changes are needed for Reducing emissions from deforestation and forest degradation and GHG reporting under the UNFCCC.

In 1996, Least-Limiting Water Range (LLWR) was created to quantify the physical changes in soil. This indicator measures changes in available water capacity, soil structure, air filed porosity, soil strength, and oxygen diffusion rate. Changes in LLWR are known to alter ecosystems but it's to a different capacity in each region. For example, in polar regions where temperatures are more susceptible to drastic changes, melting permafrost can expose more land which leads to higher rates of plant growth and eventually, higher carbon absorption. In contrast, tropical environments experience worsening soil quality because soil aggregation levels decrease with higher temperatures.

The government of Tanzania—together with the Food and Agriculture Organization of the United Nations and the financial support of the government of Finland—have implemented a forest soil carbon monitoring program to estimate soil carbon stock, using both survey and modelling-based methods. West Africa has experienced significant loss of forest that contains high levels of soil organic carbon. This is mostly due to expansion of small scale, non-mechanized agriculture using burning as a form of land clearance. Carbon in Australian agricultural soils may historically have been twice the present range that is typically 1.6–4.6%.

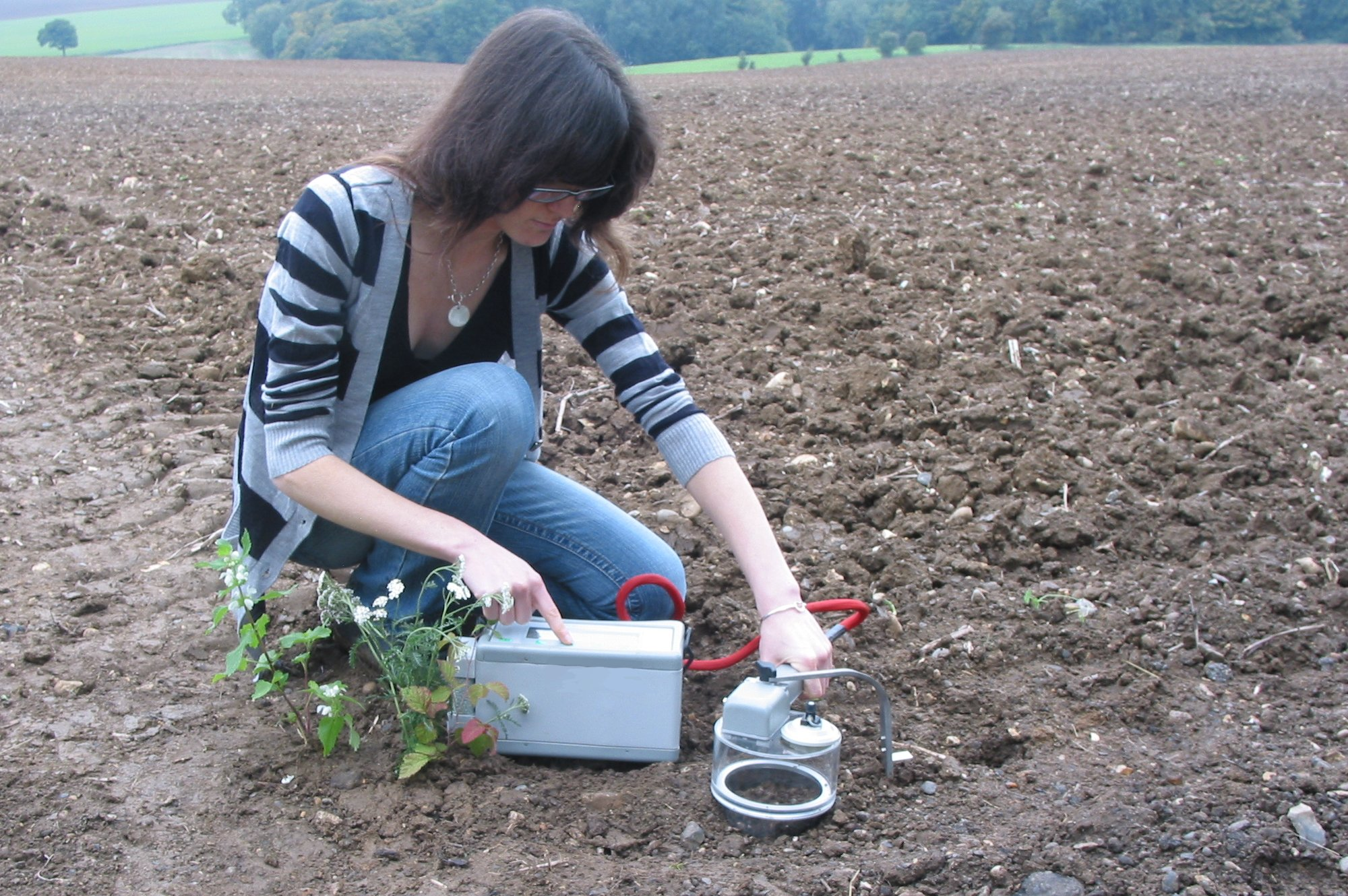
A portable soil respiration system measuring soil CO_{2} flux

==== Europe ====
The most homogeneous and comprehensive data on the organic carbon/matter content of European soils remain those that can be extracted and/or derived from the European Soil Database in combination with associated databases on land cover, climate, and topography. The modelled data refer to carbon content (%) in the surface horizon of soils in Europe. In an inventory on available national datasets, seven member states of the European Union have available datasets on organic carbon. In the article "Estimating soil organic carbon in Europe based on data collected through a European network" (Ecological Indicators 24, pp. 439–450), a comparison of national data with modelled data is performed. The LUCAS soil organic carbon data are measured surveyed points and the aggregated results at regional level show important findings. Finally, a new proposed model for estimation of soil organic carbon in agricultural soils has estimated current top SOC stock of 17.63 Gt in EU agricultural soils. This modelling framework has been updated by integrating the soil erosion component to estimate the lateral carbon fluxes. Currently, the EU-ORCaSA project is developing a multi-ecosystem framework for measuring, reporting and verification of soil organic carbon changes to support policy making.

== See also ==
- Biochar
- Biosequestration
- Carbon cycle
- Carbon farming
- Carbon sequestration
- Coarse woody debris
- Mycorrhizal fungi and soil carbon storage
- Soil biodiversity
- Soil regeneration and climate change
