= Duganella phyllosphaerae =

Scientific classification
- Domain: Bacteria
- Kingdom: Pseudomonadati
- Phylum: Pseudomonadota
- Class: Betaproteobacteria
- Order: Burkholderiales
- Family: Oxalobacteraceae
- Genus: Duganella
- Species: D. phyllosphaerae

Binomial name
- Duganella phyllosphaerae Kämpfer et al. 2012, sp. nov.

Type strain
- CCM 7824, LMG 25994, T54

Species of bacterium

Duganella phyllosphaerae is a bacterium from the genus Duganella in the family Oxalobacteraceae which was isolated from the leaf surface of Trifolium repens in Germany. D. phyllosphaerae is a bright-yellow pigmented bacterium.
