= Duganella zoogloeoides =

Scientific classification
- Domain: Bacteria
- Kingdom: Pseudomonadati
- Phylum: Pseudomonadota
- Class: Betaproteobacteria
- Order: Burkholderiales
- Family: Oxalobacteraceae
- Genus: Duganella
- Species: D. zoogloeoides

Binomial name
- Duganella zoogloeoides Hiraishi et al. 1997

Type strain
- ATCC 25935, IAM 12670, JCM 20729, KCTC 2582, NBRC 102465, NCIMB 11941, OSU 115, P. R. Dugan 115

Synonyms
- Zoogloea ramigera

Species of bacterium

Duganella zoogloeoides is a bacterium in the Oxalobacteraceae family. In a phylogenetic analysis of Zoogloea ramigera, it has been shown to belong to the beta subclass of the class Pseudomonadota which means Z. ramigera should be reclassified as a new taxon name, Duganella zoogloeoides.
