= Perturbation (geology) =

Mixing between soil horizons which becomes a catalyst in soil formation

Perturbation (from Latin: perturbare "to confuse, disorder, disturb", from per- "through" + turbare "disturb, confuse," from turba "turmoil, crowd") is a set of pedology (soil study) and sedimentary geology processes relating to changes in the nature of water-borne alluvial sediments and in situ soil deposits over time.

Pedoturbation (from Greek: πέδον (pédon), "soil") involves mixing between soil horizons and is an important factor in soil formation. Pedoturbation includes churning clays, cryoturbation, and bioturbation. Pedoturbation transforms soils through destratification, mixing, and sorting, as well as creating preferential flow paths for soil gas and infiltrating water.

Precipitation of surface salts also causes localized disruption of soils. Because it does not result in mixing between soil horizons, it is not considered pedoturbation.

== See also ==
- Turbidite
