= Root mucilage =

Root mucilage is made of plant-specific polysaccharides or long chains of sugar molecules. This polysaccharide secretion of root exudate forms a gelatinous substance that sticks to the caps of roots. Root mucilage is known to play a role in forming relationships with soil-dwelling life forms. Just how this root mucilage is secreted is debated, but there is growing evidence that mucilage derives from ruptured cells. As roots penetrate through the soil, many of the cells surrounding the caps of roots are continually shed and replaced. These ruptured or lysed cells release their component parts, which include the polysaccharides that form root mucilage. These polysaccharides come from the Golgi apparatus and plant cell wall, which are rich in plant-specific polysaccharides. Unlike animal cells, plant cells have a cell wall that acts as a barrier surrounding the cell providing strength, which supports plants just like a skeleton.

This cell wall is used to produce everyday products such as timber, paper, and natural fabrics, including cotton.

Root mucilage is a part of a wider secrete from plant roots known as root exudate. Plant roots secrete a variety of organic molecules into the surrounding soil, such as proteins, enzymes, DNA, sugars and amino acids, which are the building blocks of life. This collective secretion is known as root exudate. This root exudate prevents root infection from bacteria and fungi, helps the roots to penetrate through the soil, and can create a micro-climate that is beneficial to the plant.

== Root mucilage composition ==
To determine the sugars within root mucilage, monosaccharide analysis and monosaccharide linkage analysis are undertaken. Monosaccharide linkage analysis involves methylating the root mucilage, which contains polysaccharides. The root mucilage is hydrolysed using acid to break down the polysaccharides into their monosaccharide components. The subsistent monosaccharides are then reduced to open their rings. The open ring monosaccharides are then acetylated, and separated typically by using gas chromatography, although liquid chromatography is also used. The masses of the monosaccharides are then detected using mass spectrometry. The gas chromatography retention times and the mass spectrometry chromatogram are used to identify how the monosaccharides are linked to form the polysaccharides that make root mucilage. For monosaccharide analysis, which reveals the sugars that make root mucilage, scientists hydrolyse the root mucilage using acid, and put the samples directly through gas chromatography linked to mass spectrometry.

Several scientists have determined the composition of plant root mucilage using monosaccharide analysis and linkage analysis, showing that Maize (Zea mays) root mucilage contains high levels of galactose, xylose, arabinose, rhamnose, and glucose, and lower levels of uronic acid, mannose, fucose, and glucuronic acid. Wheat (Triticum aestivum) root mucilage also contains high levels of xylose, arabinose, galactose, glucose, and lower levels of rhamnose, glucuronic acid and mannose. Cowpea (Vigna unguiculata) also contains high levels of arabinose, galactose, glucose, fucose, and xylose, and lower levels of rhamnose, mannose, and glucuronic acid. Many other plants have had their root mucilage composition determined using monosaccharide analysis and monosaccharide linkage analysis. With the following monosaccharides determined as well as their linkages, scientists have determined the presence of pectin, arabinogalactan proteins, xyloglucan, arabinan, and xylan, which are plant-specific polysaccharides within the root mucilage of plants.

== Importance and role of root mucilage ==
Plants use up to 40% of their energy secreting root mucilage, which they generate from photosynthesis that takes place in the leaves. Root mucilage plays a role in developing a symbiotic relationship with the soil-dwelling fungi. This important relationship is known to affect 94% of land plants, and benefits plants by increasing water and nutrient uptake from the soil, particularly phosphorus. In return, the fungi receive food in the form of carbohydrates from the plant in the form of broken-down root mucilage. Without this relationship, many plants would struggle to gain sufficient water or nutrients.

Root mucilage also helps soil to stick to roots. The purpose of this is to maintain the plant's contact with the soil so that the plant can regulate the levels of water it can absorb, decrease friction so that roots can penetrate through the soil, and maintain a micro-climate. Root mucilage contributes to the particular hydrophysical properties of the rhizosphere, which can affect the plant's response to water deficit. For example, root mucilage can reduce evaporation and store water in the rhizosphere.

== See also ==
- Mucilage
- Marine mucilage
