= Streptomyces rhizophilus =

Scientific classification
- Domain: Bacteria
- Kingdom: Bacillati
- Phylum: Actinomycetota
- Class: Actinomycetia
- Order: Streptomycetales
- Family: Streptomycetaceae
- Genus: Streptomyces
- Species: S. rhizophilus

Binomial name
- Streptomyces rhizophilus Lee and Whang 2014

Type strain
- KACC 16580, NBRC 108885, JR-41

Species of bacterium

Streptomyces rhizophilus is a bacterium species from the genus of Streptomyces which has been isolated from rhizosphere soil from the plant Sasa borealis.

== See also ==
- List of Streptomyces species
