= Plant root exudates =

Fluids emitted through the roots of plants

Plant root exudates are fluids emitted through the roots of plants. These secretions influence the rhizosphere around the roots to inhibit harmful microbes and promote the growth of self and kin plants.

Plant root systems can grow to be complex due to a variety of species and microorganisms existing in a common soil. Plants have adapted to respond to the soil conditions and presence of microbes through various mechanisms, one of which is the secretion of root exudates. This secretion allows plants to largely influence the rhizosphere as well as the organisms that exist within it. The contents of exudates and the amount of substance released is reliant on multiple factors, including the root system architecture, presence of harmful microbes, and metal toxicity. The species of the plant as well as its developmental stage can also influence the chemical mixture that is released through exudates. The contents may include ions, carbon-based compounds, amino acids, sterols, and many other chemical compounds. At sufficient concentrations, exudates are capable of mediating both positive and negative plant-plant and plant-microbe interactions.

The physiological mechanism by which exudates are released is not entirely understood and varies depending on the stimulus as well as the contents of the secreted exudate. Various types of root cells have been suggested to sense microbes or compounds in the soil and secrete exudates accordingly. One example of root exudation occurs when plants sense elicitors and prime for a stress or defense response. It is believed that elicitors, such as methyl jasmonate and salicylic acid, are sensed by receptors on root cap cells, often referred to as border cells. This induces a change in gene regulation, up-regulating specific defense or stress-response genes. This differential gene expression results in metabolic changes that ultimately result in the biosynthesis of primary and secondary metabolites. These metabolites exit cells in the form of exudates through transporters that vary depending on the chemical structure of the metabolites. The exudate secretion is then able to elicit a defense response against harmful microbes within the soil.

== Rhizosphere ==
The rhizosphere is the thin area of soil immediately surrounding the root system. It is a densely populated area in which the roots compete with invading root systems of neighboring plant species for space, water, and mineral nutrients as well as form positive and negative relationships with soil-borne microorganisms such as bacteria, fungi and insects. Quantifying how much photosynthetically fixed carbon is transferred to soil via plant root exudates is difficult, but 5% can be considered a rough estimate. Root exudates are seen as key mediators in the interaction between plants and soil microbiota.

Root exudates contain a wide variety of molecules released by the plant into the soil. They act as a signaling messenger that allows for communication between soil microbes and plant roots. Exudates influence several factors within the soil such as nutrient availability, soil pH, and recruitment of bacteria and fungi. All of these impact the relationships that plants have with each other as well as soilborne microorganisms. The most notable positive relationship is that of roots and mycorrhizae. It is estimated that 80-90% of plants are colonized by mycorrhizae in nature. Mycorrhizae are known to promote plant growth and increase water use efficiency. Plants establish these mutualistic relationships with bacteria and fungi by modulating the composition of the root exudates. While positive relationships like this do exist, it is worth noting that most microbes have incompatible interactions with plants. One of the main forms of negative relationships in the rhizosphere is allelopathy. This is the act of releasing phytotoxins into the rhizosphere that can influence neighboring plant's growth, respiration, photosynthesis, metabolism, and water and nutrient uptake. Allelochemicals released by the roots do this by inducing changes in cell structures, inhibiting cell division and elongation, destabilizing the antioxidant system, and increasing membrane permeability.

The plant family (Asteraceae, Brassicaceae, Fabaceae, and Poaceae) is the most important source of variation in exudation rates and microbial community structure between plant species. Root symbiotic associations impacts the rate of sugar exudation in the rhizosphere. Root exudation impacts microbial activities as well as the diversity of active microbiota involved in root exudate assimilation. Root exudates play a major role in root-soil contact, the exact purpose of the exudates and the reactions they cause are still poorly understood.

== Mechanism and structure ==
Plants have developed various advantageous mechanisms to manipulate their habitats. This is important as a plants’ habitat is crucial towards their growth as it dictates energy, water intake, nutrient intake and others [1]. Thus, a mechanism known as exudation that has been used by plants to possibly manipulate its surroundings, has been found to be useful although it is not fully understood how plants utilize it. Nor is it understood if the process of exudations is truly advantageous or how it is controlled by plants. An example of this would be the maize species which is grown as an agricultural staple and thus is located in close proximity to other species of plants. The maize plant releases exudates to deter herbivore attacks from pest by reducing its leaf nutrient value and as well repressing its size. While a defensive mechanism this action can be problematic for farmers because repression of growth affects their bounties. A number of proposals to explain this mechanism have been offered however, they are just proposals and have not been fully developed and tested to assert their claims. One such claim is that root exudates are beneficial for defense. While another claims that exudates can also recognize who is related to the plant and who is a stranger which promotes friendly competition. Another claim asserts that plants are able to possibly adjust their source-sink allocation of resources and the process of exudation which promote positive effects for the plant's growth[2].

Primary metabolites that are released into the soil by plants consist of: amino acids, organic acids and sugars. These primary metabolites are thought to be primarily released through the root tip when the rhizosphere is negatively affected by stressors such as being nutrient poor. This environmental sense of surroundings allows the plant to dictate when these metabolites should be released. The mechanism described for this process is illustrated by facilitated diffusion from the root tip, this process requires the possible adjustment of the source sink conserves and this creates a pressure driven mechanism through the phloem. Traveling through the simplistic pathway is the most common method as they can travel freely however while nearing their journey, they have to pass through a plasma membrane and to do this they need a transmembrane protein to complete the trip. “The phloem unloads the primary metabolites through the plasmodesmata using both facilitated diffusion and pressure flow mechanics to push release at the root tip”.

Another possible mechanism of release of exudates would be the plants ability to control “efflux of primary metabolites is controlled through distinct channels and carriers which in turn allow down regulation in response to gene expression and or post translational modifications” examples of such transporters are GDU, SWEET, and CAT transporters. This mechanism also allows the reuptake of metabolites which requires active transport to bring them against the concentration gradient It is also thought that through the rhizosphere microorganisms can trigger root exudations by changing the gradient of the soil, causing a response from the plant to trigger root exudation. While the study of primary metabolites still needs more work, the proposals displayed due seem to provide a logical explanation for the mechanism driving root exudation.

Secondary metabolites consist of a variety of small molecules, they are vast in the rhizosphere of plants and are used in numerous ways to benefit them. Since these small molecules come in a variety of forms, they are able to pinpoint diverse targets in microorganisms, other plants and even animals. An example of a secondary metabolite would be Flavonoids which have been noted to provide an important role in movement of auxin for growth, the development of shoots and roots, and in certain species of plant promotes communication between plants and symbiotic bacteria. Another example would be long-chain hydroquinone who are transported through the plant via passive exudation. Specifically, these metabolites are released using the simplistic and apoplastic pathways and then finally “through the pores in the tips of root hairs where they bind to soil particles and organic matter”. They are also known to be involved with germination stimulation in certain species. All in all, the role of secondary metabolites is still in need of research as their fate in the rhizosphere remains unknown after several days have passed.

In one study the scientist studied how plant root exudates can manipulate the environment of the rhizosphere which in turn causes feedback in the soil to the plant [1]. The plants they studied for this experiment were wheat and maize species which release a secondary metabolite known as Benzoxazinoids which is a defensive metabolite. Benzoxazinoids can change the relationship in fungal and bacteria for roots, as well as repress plant growth, and cause an increase in signaling for defensive purposes such as preventing herbivory attacks. The experiment also included mutant types of the wheat and maize families to test the lack of BX which is an activator for the response of signaling through Benzoxazinoids. What they found was that the rhizosphere was very different between mutant and wild type plants. The next experiment they did was to test benzoxazinoids to increase plant defense, to do this they measured growth and defense against herbivory in maize plants while using both mutant and wild type maize plants. The results for this test indicated that there were less herbivory attacks and increased defense mechanisms through increased signal Salicylic Acid, Jasmonic acid and others. There was also a decrease in sugar content in leaves and decreased size of stems. The conclusion for this experiment was that through the breakdown of products using Benzoxazinoids they can stimulate the soil to promote beneficial changes in the soil environment.

Plants are extremely versatile and have been able to develop advantageous mechanisms to overcome the constant environmental changes throughout time. Despite being unable to move and flee like animals they are able to utilize other skills to gain nutrients, water, enact defensive mechanisms and possibly communicate with fellow kin. This has been linked to a process known as root exudation which is a product of plants that is released from the root tips through the root hairs. This can be in the form of primary metabolites which are directly related to plant growth or in the form of indirect secondary metabolites. Either way these have been shown to impact the way the plant interacts with its rhizosphere through manipulation of the rhizosphere environment, which enables symbiotic relationships as well as causing feedback in the plant to repress growth, promote friendly competition with kin, or aggressive behavior with unrelated plants. The mechanism powering this response has many proposals, one being that exudate secretion is controlled through redistribution of concentration gradients by manipulating the source-sink in plants. It is also thought to be controlled by down regulation through distinct channels utilizing specific transporters which also allow reuptake of metabolites through active transport. In order to focus on the ability of plants to regulate their secretion of exudates in the rhizosphere, scientists studied maize and wheat plants and their mutants to see how missing the activator for the respective metabolite affected the release of exudates. They found that those missing the activator were more likely to be eaten by pests while showing normal growth. Those plants with the activator showed repressed growth and lower nutrient uptake as a defense mechanism against the pest. This experiment displays that root exudates are capable of providing a beneficial response for a plant by providing a number of reactions to deter pests through defensive mechanisms and promotion of beneficial symbiotic relationships. More research is needed to specify the exact mechanisms and consequences of root exudation.

== Kin recognition ==
Arabidopsis seedlings grown in non-sibling exudates produced more lateral roots compared to those grown in exudates of kin or self-origin. Additionally, roots appeared to grow shorter when grown in non-sibling exudates. The Arabidopsis seedlings are capable of detecting the exudates around them and responding accordingly. This ability may be beneficial for fitness, allowing plants to allocate fewer resources to competition when grown amongst kin.
