= Rhizosphere =

Region of soil or substrate comprising the root microbiome

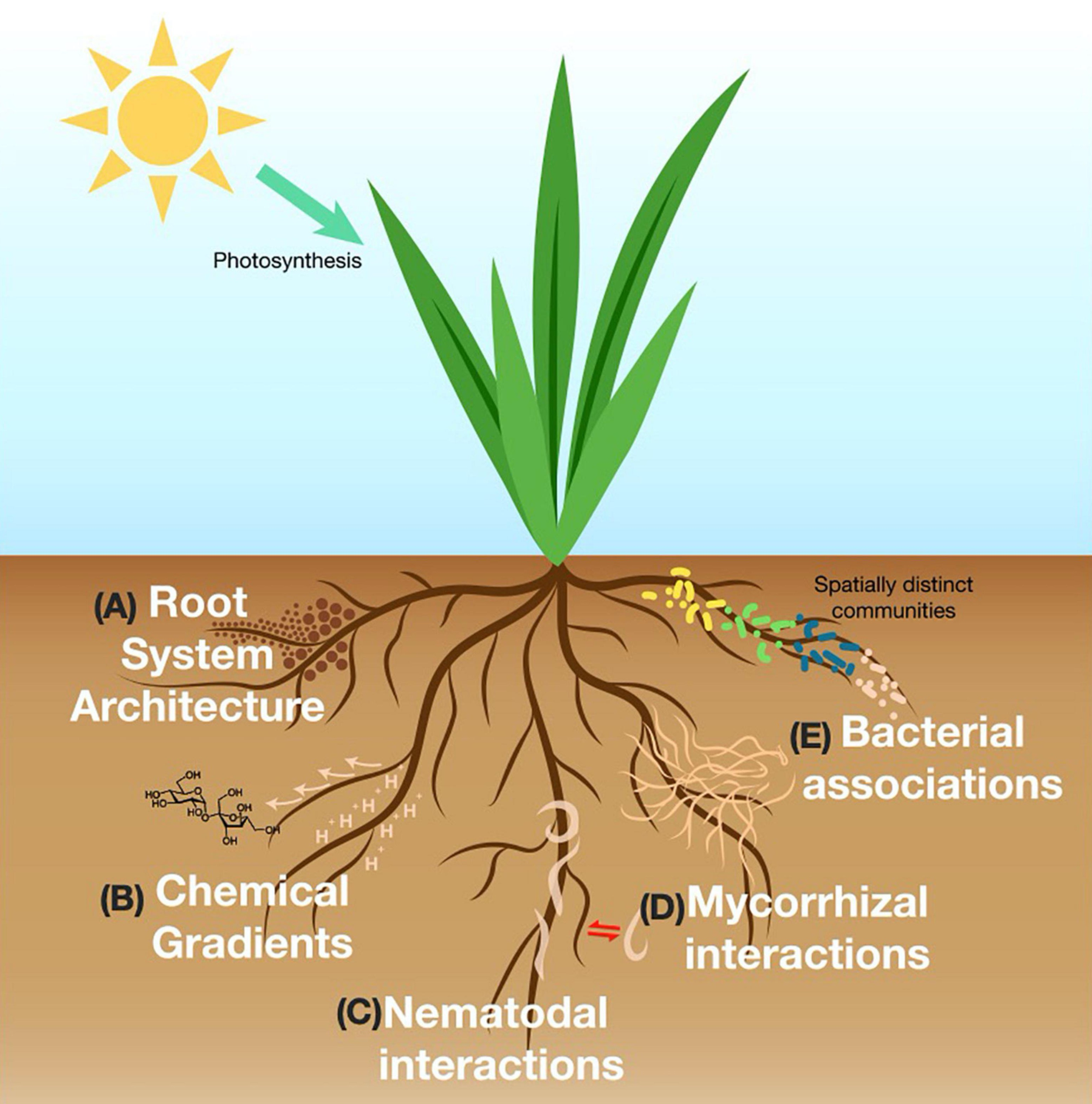
Some rhizosphere processes in the soil (A) Root system architecture is concerned with structural features of the root and responds to with environmental stimuli. (B) The rhizosphere produces photosynthetically fixed carbon that exudes into the soil and influences soil physicochemical gradients. (C) Free-living or parasitic nematodes interact with the rhizosphere via signaling interactions. (D) Mycorrhizal fungi create intimate relationships with the roots and engage in nutrient exchange. (E) Bacterial composition is distinct upon different parts, age, type of the roots.

The rhizosphere is the narrow region of soil or substrate that is directly influenced by root secretions and associated soil microorganisms known as the root microbiome. Soil pores in the rhizosphere can contain many bacteria and other microorganisms that feed on sloughed-off plant cells, termed rhizodeposition, and the proteins and sugars released by roots, termed root exudates. This symbiosis leads to more complex interactions, influencing plant growth and competition for resources. Much of the nutrient cycling and disease suppression by antibiotics required by plants occurs immediately adjacent to roots due to root exudates and metabolic products of symbiotic and pathogenic communities of microorganisms. The rhizosphere also provides space to produce allelochemicals to control neighbours and relatives.

The rhizoplane refers to the root surface including its associated soil particles which closely interact with each other. The plant-soil feedback loop and other physical factors occurring at the plant-root soil interface are important selective pressures in communities and growth in the rhizosphere and rhizoplane. Root respiration and exudation can generate Anoxic microsites in soil adjacent to roots, shaping microbial community structure.

== Background ==
The term "rhizosphere" was used first in 1904 by the German plant physiologist Lorenz Hiltner to describe how plant roots interface with the surrounding soil. The prefix rhiza- comes from the Greek, meaning "root". Hiltner postulated the rhizosphere was a region surrounding the plant roots and populated with microorganisms under some degree of control by chemicals released from the plant roots.

== Chemical interactions ==
=== Chemical availability ===
Plant roots may exude 20–40% of the sugars and organic acids—photosynthetically fixed carbon. Plant root exudates, such as organic acids, change the chemical structure and the biological communities of the rhizosphere in comparison with the bulk soil or parent soil. Concentrations of organic acids and saccharides affect the ability of the biological communities to shuttle phosphorus, nitrogen, potassium, and water to the root cap, and the total availability of iron to the plant and to its neighbors. The ability of the plant's root and its associated soil microorganisms to provide specific transport proteins affects the availability of iron and other minerals for it and its neighbors. This can affect the composition of the community and its fitness.

Root exudates come in the form of chemicals released into the rhizosphere by cells in the roots and cell waste referred to as rhizodeposition. This rhizodeposition comes in various forms of organic carbon and nitrogen that provide for the communities around plant roots and dramatically affect the chemistry surrounding the roots. Exopolysaccharides, such as polyglycolide (PGA), affect the ability of roots to uptake water by maintaining the physical stability of the soil carbon sponge and controlling the flow of water. For example, a tomato field study showed that exopolysaccharides extracted from the rhizosphere were different (total sugar amounts and mean infrared measurements) depending on the tomato varieties grown, and that under water deficit conditions (limited irrigation), the increase in exopolysaccharide production and microbial activity affected water retention in the soil and field performance of tomato. In potato cultivar root exudates, phenols and lignins comprise the greatest number of ion influencing compounds regardless of growing location; however, the intensity of different compounds was found to be influenced by soils and environmental conditions, resulting in variation amongst nitrogen compounds, lignins, phenols, carbohydrates, and amines. In addition to supporting beneficial communities, the accumulation of specific root exudates over time can create negative feedback loops for the host plant. In aged tea plantations, the buildup of plant polyphenols in the soil has been directly linked to a detrimental shift in soil microbial communities, contributing to the decline in soil health and productivity known as soil sickness.

=== Allelochemicals ===
Although it goes beyond the rhizosphere area, it is notable that some plants secrete allelochemicals from their roots, which inhibits the growth of other organisms. For example, garlic mustard produces a chemical that is believed to prevent mutualisms forming between the surrounding trees and mycorrhiza in mesic North American temperate forests where it is an invasive species.

== Ecology of the rhizosphere ==
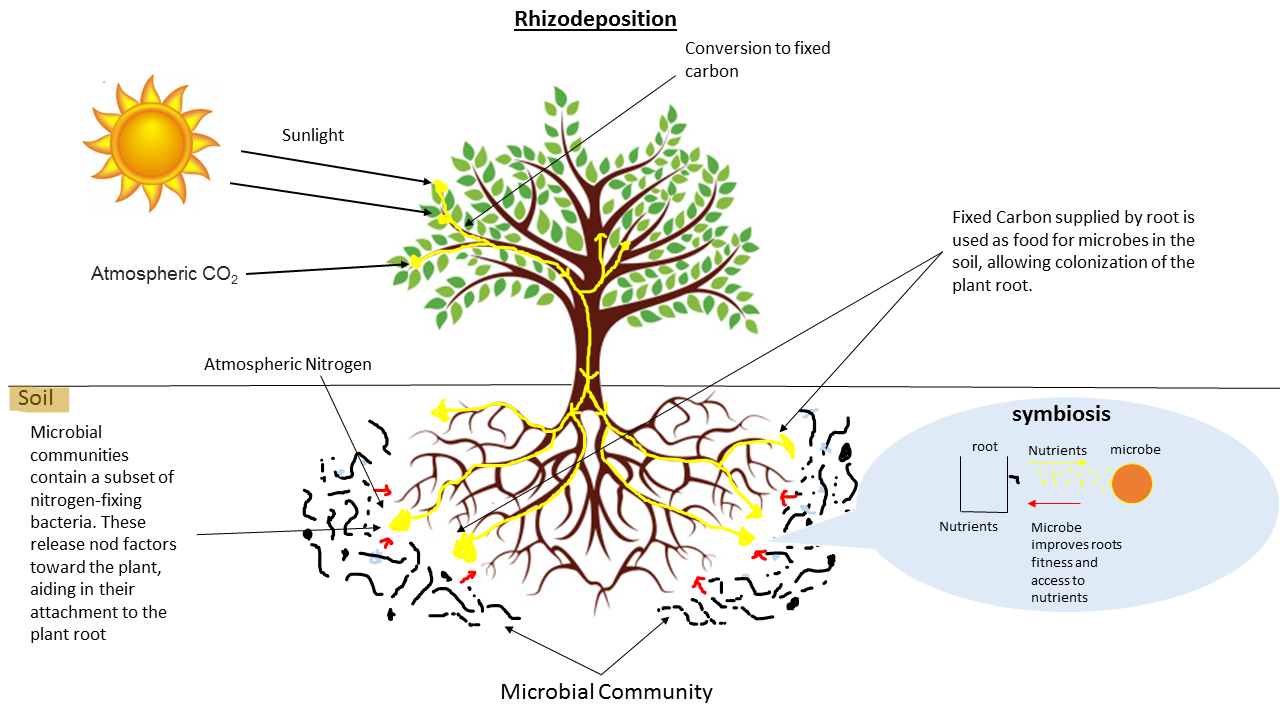
Sunlight and carbon dioxide from the atmosphere are absorbed by the leaves in the plant and converted to fixed carbon. This carbon travels down into the plant's roots, where some travels back up to the leaves. The fixed carbon traveling to the root is radiated outward into the surrounding soil, where microbes use it as food for growth. In return, microbes attach to the plant root, which improves the root's access to nutrients and its resistance to environmental stress and pathogens. In specific plant/root symbiotic relationships, the plant root secretes flavonoids into the soil, which is sensed by microbes, which release nod factors to the plant root, which promotes the infection of the plant root. These unique microbes carry out nitrogen fixation in root nodules, which supplies nutrients to the plant.

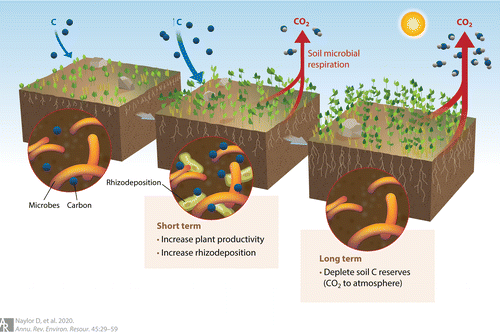
Predicted effects of elevated carbon dioxide on soil carbon reserves In the short term, plant growth is stimulated by elevated carbon dioxide, resulting in increased rhizodeposition, priming microbes to mineralize soil organic carbon (SOC) and adding CO2 to the atmosphere through respiration. But the net impact on greenhouse gas emissions will be reduced by the increased uptake of CO2 from the atmosphere by increased plant growth. However, over the long term, soil reserves of easily decomposed carbon will be depleted by the increase in microbial activity, resulting in increased catabolism of SOC reservoirs, thus increasing atmospheric CO2 concentrations beyond what is taken up by plants. This is predicted to be a particular problem in thawing permafrost that contains large reserves of SOC that are becoming increasingly susceptible to microbial degradation as the permafrost thaws.

Rhizodeposition allows for the growth of communities of microorganisms directly surrounding and inside plant roots. This leads to complex interactions between species, including mutualism, predation/parasitism, and competition.

=== Predation ===
Predation is considered to be top-down because these interactions decrease the population. Still, the closeness of species interactions directly affects the availability of resources, causing the population to be affected by bottom-up controls. Without soil fauna, microbes that directly prey upon competitors of plants, and plant mutualists, interactions within the rhizosphere would be antagonistic toward the plants. Soil fauna provides the rhizosphere's top-down component while allowing for the bottom-up increase in nutrients from rhizodeposition and inorganic nitrogen. The complexity of these interactions has also been shown through experiments with common soil fauna, such as nematodes and protists. Predation by bacterial-feeding nematodes was shown to influence nitrogen availability and plant growth. There was also an increase in the populations of bacteria to which nematodes were added. Predation upon Pseudomonas by amoeba shows predators can upregulate toxins produced by prey without direct interaction using supernatant. The ability of predators to control the expression and production of biocontrol agents in prey without direct contact is related to the evolution of prey species to signals of high predator density and nutrient availability.

The food web in the rhizosphere can be considered as three different channels with two distinct sources of energy: the detritus-dependent channels are fungi and bacterial species, and the root energy-dependent channel consists of nematodes, symbiotic species, and some arthropods. This food web is constantly in flux since the amount of detritus available and the rate of root sloughing changes as roots grow and age. This bacterial channel is considered to be a faster channel because of the ability of species to focus on more accessible resources in the rhizosphere and have faster regeneration times compared with the fungal channel. All three of these channels are also interrelated to the roots that form the base of the rhizosphere ecosystem and the predators, such as the nematodes and protists, that prey upon many of the same species of microflora.

=== Competition ===
The competition between plants due to released exudates is dependent upon geometrical properties, which determine the capacity of interception of exudates from any point on the plant's roots, and physicochemical properties, which determine the capacity of each root to take up exudates in the area. Geometrical properties are the density of roots, root diameter, and distribution of the roots. Physicochemical properties are exudation rate, decay rate of exudates, and the properties of the environment that affect diffusion. These properties define the rhizosphere of roots and the likelihood that plants can directly compete with neighbors.

Plants and soil microflora indirectly compete against one another by tying up limiting resources, such as carbon and nitrogen, into their biomass. This competition can occur at varying rates due to the ratio of carbon to nitrogen in detritus and the ongoing mineralization of nitrogen in the soil. Mycorrhizae and heterotrophic soil microorganisms compete for both carbon and nitrogen, depending upon which is limiting at the time, which heavily depends on the species, scavenging abilities, and the environmental conditions affecting nitrogen input. Plants are less successful at the uptake of organic nitrogen, such as amino acids than the soil microflora that exists in the rhizosphere. This informs other mutualistic relationships formed by plants around nitrogen uptake.

Competition over other resources, such as oxygen in limited environments, is directly affected by the spatial and temporal locations of species and the rhizosphere. In methanotrophs, proximity to higher-density roots and the surface is important and helps determine where they dominate over heterotrophs in rice paddies.

The weak connection between the various energy channels is essential in regulating predator and prey populations and the availability of resources to the biome. Strong connections between resource-consumer and consumer-consumer create coupled systems of oscillators, which are then determined by the nature of the available resources. These systems can then be considered cyclical, quasi-periodic, or chaotic.

Plants secrete many compounds through their roots to serve symbiotic functions in the rhizosphere. Strigolactones, secreted and detected by mycorrhizal fungi, stimulate the germination of spores and initiate changes in the mycorrhiza that allow it to colonize the root. The parasitic plant, Striga, also detects the presence of strigolactones and will germinate when it detects them; they will then move into the root, feeding off the nutrients present.

Symbiotic nitrogen-fixing bacteria, such as Rhizobium species, detect compounds like flavonoids secreted by the roots of leguminous plants and then produce nod factors that signal to the plant that they are present and will lead to the formation of root nodules. Bacteria are housed in symbiosomes in these nodules, where they are sustained by nutrients from the plant and convert nitrogen gas to a form that the plant can use. Non-symbiotic (or "free-living") nitrogen-fixing bacteria may reside in the rhizosphere just outside the roots of certain plants (including many grasses) and similarly "fix" nitrogen gas in the nutrient-rich plant rhizosphere. Even though these organisms are thought to be only loosely associated with the plants they inhabit, they may respond very strongly to the status of the plants. For example, nitrogen-fixing bacteria in the rhizosphere of the rice plant exhibit diurnal cycles that mimic plant behavior and tend to supply more fixed nitrogen during growth stages when the plant exhibits a high demand for nitrogen.

Beyond symbiotic relationships like mycorrhizae and rhizobia, free-living bacteria in the rhizosphere play a crucial role in plant growth. These communities can be significantly stimulated by organic amendments. The application of organic matter such as sugarcane straw, goat manure, and filtered mud has been shown to enhance the abundance and activity of free-living, plant-growth-promoting bacteria. These stimulated communities, in turn, improve nutrient cycling (such as nitrogen fixation and phosphorus solubilization) and support crop growth, even in the absence of specialized root nodules.

In exchange for the resources and shelter plants and roots provide, fungi and bacteria control pathogenic microbes. The fungi that perform such activities also serve close relationships with species of plants in the form of mycorrhizal fungi, which are diverse in how they relate to plants. Arbuscular mycorrhizal fungi and the bacteria that make the rhizosphere their home also form close relationships to be more competitive. which plays into the bigger cycles of nutrients that impact the ecosystem, such as biogeochemical pathways.

=== Community structure ===
The rhizosphere has been referred to as an information superhighway because of the proximity of data points, which include roots and organisms in the soil, and the methods for transferring data using exudates and communities. This description has been used to explain the complex interactions that plants, their fungal mutualists, and the bacterial species that live in the rhizosphere have entered into throughout their evolution. Certain species like Trichoderma are interesting because of their ability to select for species in this complex web. Trichoderma is a biological control agent because of evidence that it can reduce plant pathogens in the rhizosphere. Plants themselves also affect which bacterial species in the rhizosphere are selected against because of the introduction of exudates and the relationships that they maintain. The control of which species are in these small diversity hotspots can drastically affect the capacity of these spaces and future conditions for future ecologies. Intensive agricultural management, particularly long-term monoculture, can override these natural selection processes, leading to "soil sickness." This phenomenon is characterized by a shift in pathogenic and beneficial microbial populations, negatively impacting soil fertility and crop yield. For example, continuous sugarcane planting has been shown to reduce soil microbial diversity and alter community composition compared to intercropping systems. Furthermore, the impact of these management practices is not uniform with depth; practices such as straw retention influence topsoil microbial communities differently than those in the subsoil.

=== Microbial consortium ===
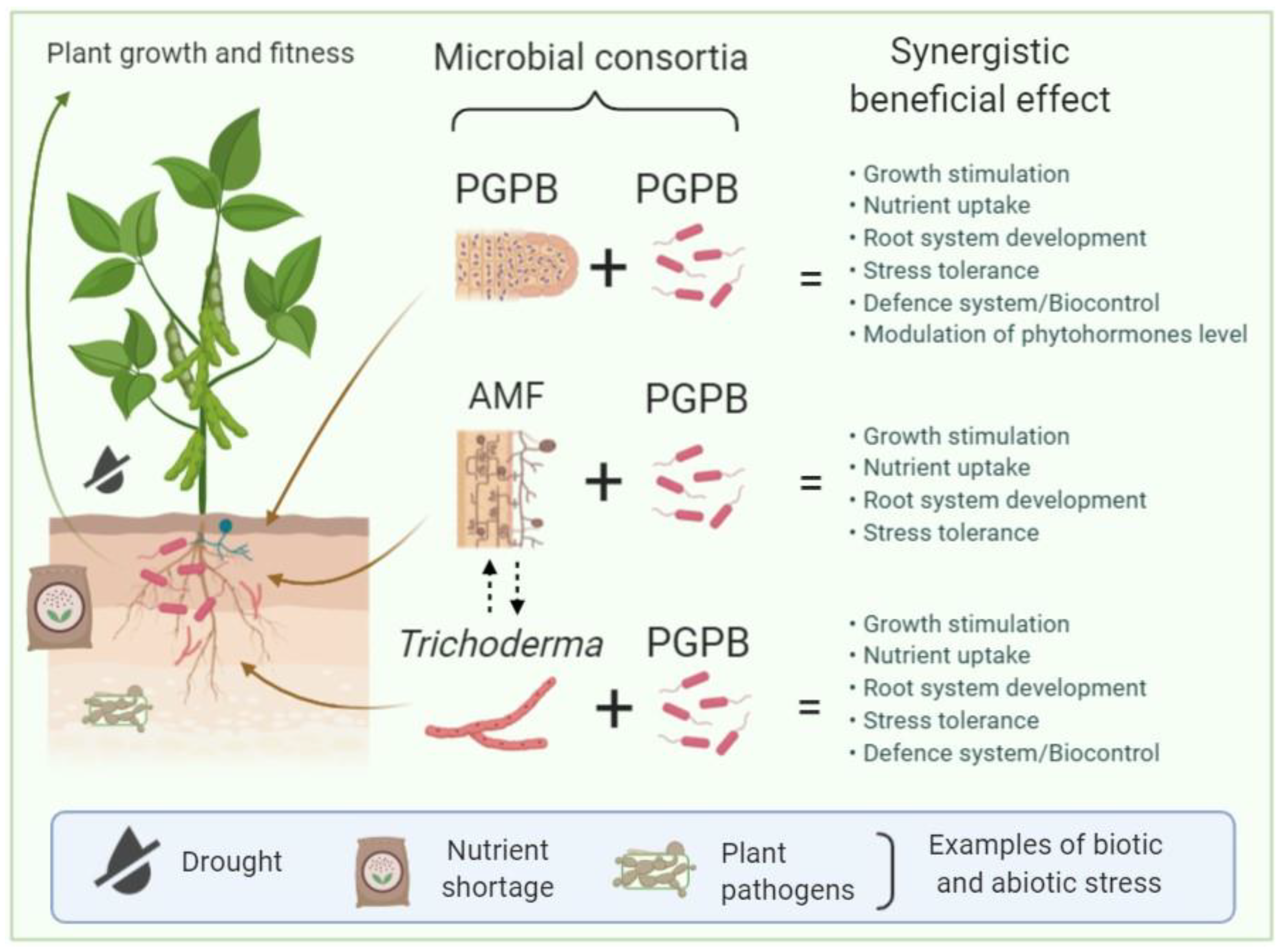
Rhizosphere microbial consortia

Although various studies have shown that single microorganisms can benefit plants, it is increasingly evident that when a microbial consortium—two or more interacting microorganisms—is involved, additive or synergistic results can be expected. This occurs, in part, because multiple species can perform a variety of tasks in an ecosystem like the rhizosphere. Beneficial mechanisms of plant growth stimulation include enhanced nutrient availability, phytohormone modulation, biocontrol, and biotic and abiotic stress tolerance) exerted by different microbial players within the rhizosphere, such as plant-growth-promoting bacteria (PGPB) and fungi such as Trichoderma and mycorrhizae.

The diagram on the right illustrates that rhizosphere microorganisms like plant-growth-promoting bacteria (PGPB), arbuscular mycorrhizal fungi (AMF), and fungi from the genus Trichoderma spp. can establish beneficial interactions with plants, promoting plant growth and development, increasing the plant defense system against pathogens, promoting nutrient uptake, and enhancing tolerance to different environmental stresses. Rhizosphere microorganisms can influence one another, and the resulting consortia of PGPB + PGPB (e.g., a nitrogen-fixing bacterium such as Rhizobium spp. and Pseudomonas fluorescens), AMF + PGPB, and Trichoderma + PGPB may have synergetic effects on plant growth and fitness, providing the plant with enhanced benefits to overcome biotic and abiotic stress. Dashed arrows indicate beneficial interactions between AMF and Trichoderma.

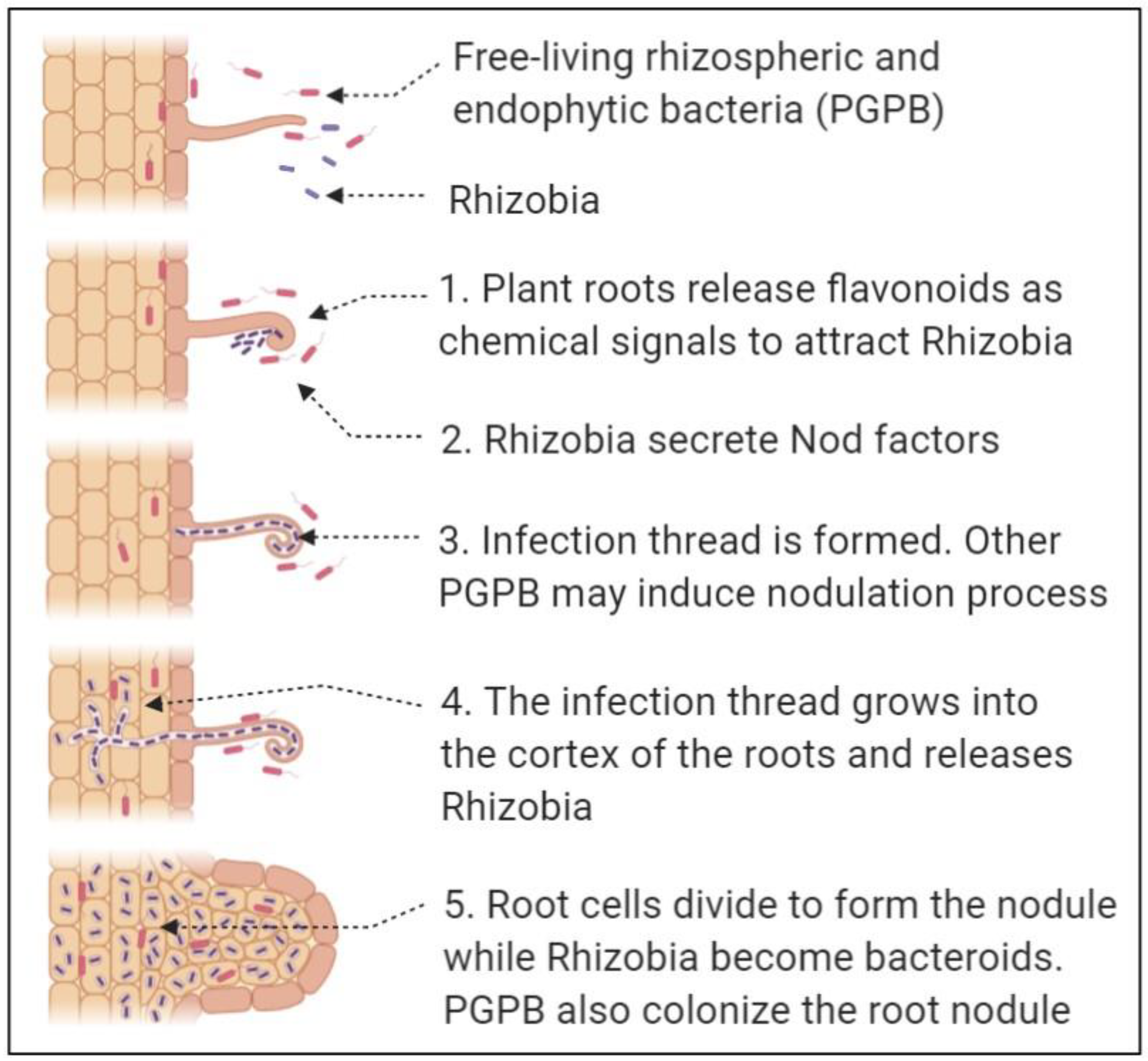
Formation of N-fixing nodules induced by rhizobia

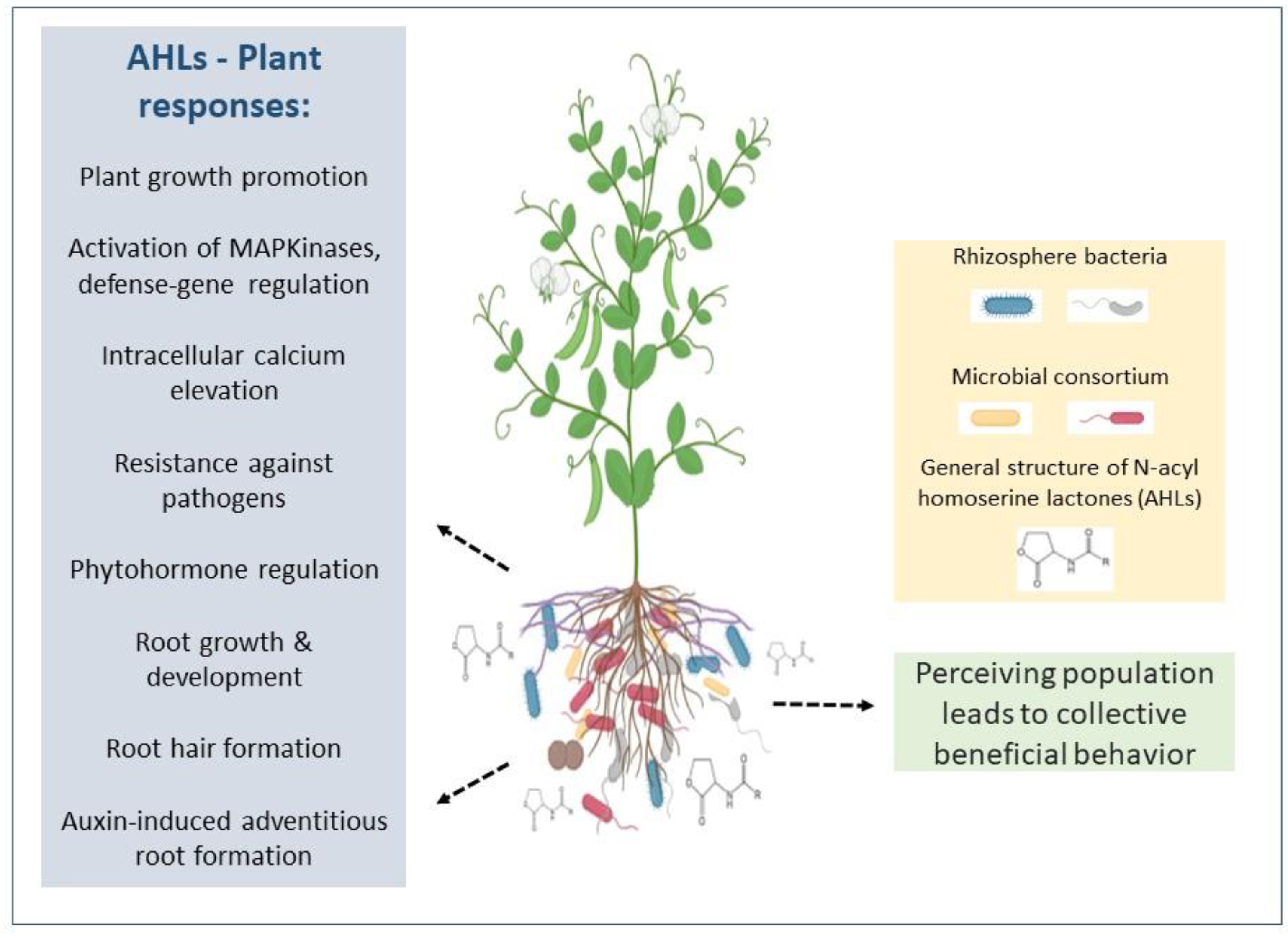
Plant responses to bacteria in the rhizosphere

=== Communication ===
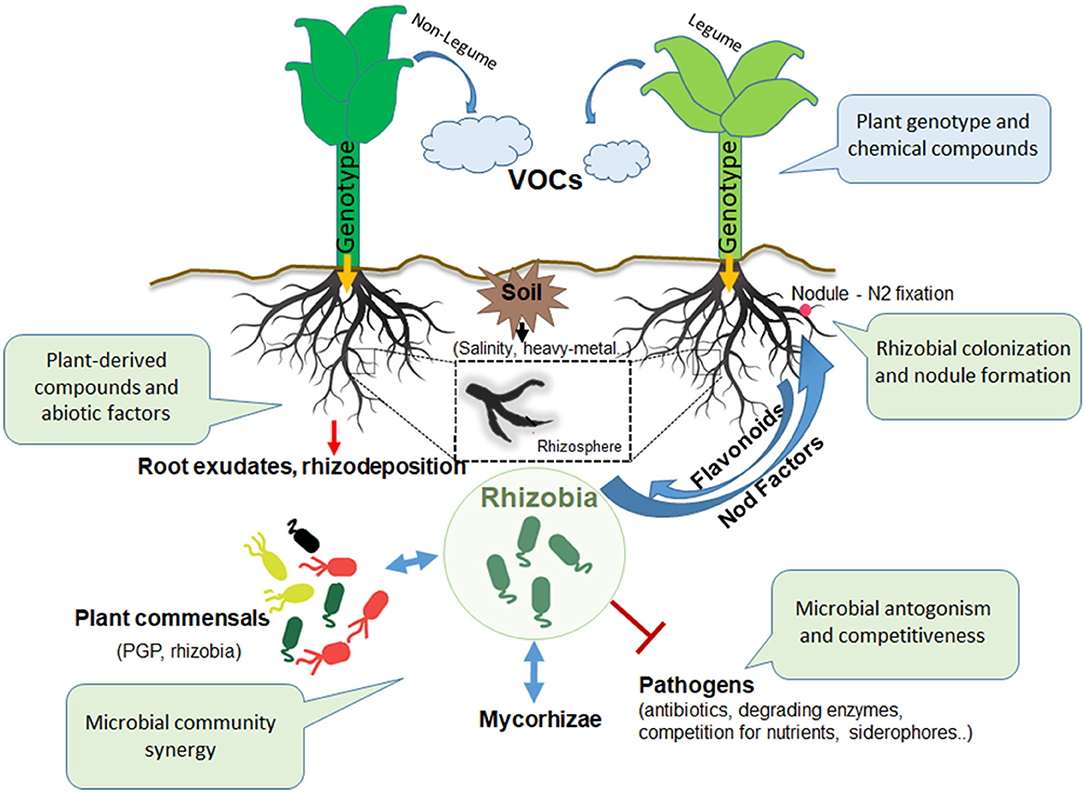
Communication in the rhizosphere Actors and interactions in the rhizosphere: Inter-kingdom and intra-kingdom communication involving plants and microbes in the rhizosphere, including the consistent role of rhizobia. VOCs = volatile organic compounds; PGP = plant growth promoting; AMF = arbuscular mycorrhizal fungi

Communication is often the basis of biotic interactions. Frequently, more than two organisms can take part in the communication, resulting in a complex network of crosstalking. Recent advances in plant-microbe interactions research have shown that communication, both inter-kingdom and intra-kingdom, is shaped by a broad spectrum of factors. In this context, the rhizosphere (i.e., the soil close to the root surface) provides a specific microhabitat where complex interactions occur. The complex environment that makes up the rhizosphere can select for certain microbial populations adapted to this unique niche. Among them, rhizobia has emerged as an important component of the rhizospheric microbiome. Rhizospheric crosstalk is found in rhizobium-legume interactions. This symbiosis is a complex process that involves signaling that can be shaped by plant rhizospheric exudates and microbiome composition. The relationship established by rhizobia with other rhizospheric organisms and the influence of environmental factors results in their beneficial role on host plant health.

Prokaryotes and eukaryotes have interacted for millions of years, evolving and refining their communication systems over time. As proposed by Hauser in 1996, biological signals and the exchange of information are part of the definition of communication, while the signals themselves are considered as "every structure able to shape the behavior of the organisms". Consequently, the signals can evolve and persist thanks to the interaction between signal producers and receivers. Then, cooperation and fitness improvement are the basis of biological communication.

In a particular environment, individuals can communicate and interact with multiple partners, and the nature of interaction can determine variable costs and benefits to the partner as a biological market. A large number of signals can be exchanged involving the plant itself, insects, fungi, and microbes. This all takes place in a high-density environmental niche. Usually, communication results from chemical responses of cells to signatory molecules from other cells. These signals affect both the metabolism and transcription of genes, activating several regulatory mechanisms.

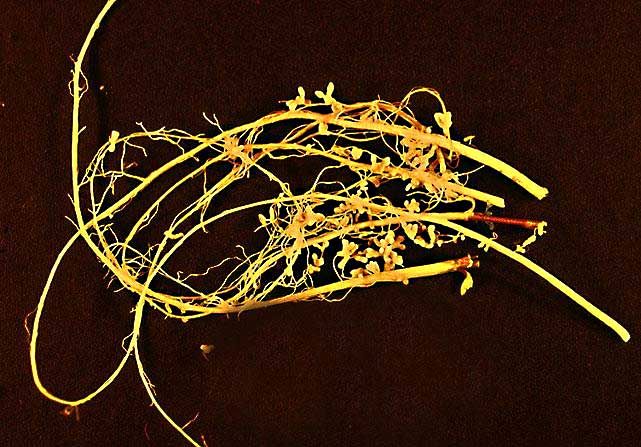
Root nodules, each containing billions of Rhizobiaceae bacteria

Frequently in the rhizosphere, more than two organisms (and species) can participate in the communication, resulting in a complex network of interactions and cross-talks that influence the fitness of all participating partners. Thus, this environment is a hot spot for numerous inter-kingdom signal exchanges involving plant-associated microbial communities (rhizobiome). The microbial community's composition is mainly shaped and recruited by hundreds of metabolites released in the soil by plant roots, which normally facilitate interactions with the biotic and abiotic environment. Often the plant can modulate its diversity based on the benefits in terms of growth and health, such as with plant growth-promoting rhizobacteria. Nevertheless, a large number of nutrients issued by the plant can be of interest to pathogenic organisms, which can take advantage of plant products for their survival in the rhizosphere.

It stands to reason that the plants play a fundamental role in the rhizosphere scene. Indeed, because of the chemical signals conveyed by nutrient-rich exudates released by the plant roots, a large variety of microbes can first colonize the rhizosphere and then gradually penetrate the root and the overall plant tissue (endophytes). Otherwise, they can colonize the host plant establishing a lasting and beneficial symbiotic relationship. To date, numerous investigations on root exudates composition have been performed.

The most known plant-microbe dialogue on the rhizosphere scene, determining direct and indirect advantages to the partners, was properly addressed as early as 1904 when Hiltner described the symbiotic interaction among legumes and rhizobia. This symbiosis is a highly specific process in which the genetic and chemical communication signals are strictly plant-bacterium-specific. In this mutualistic interaction, rhizobia positively influences the host's growth thanks to the nitrogen fixation process and, at the same time, can benefit from the nutrients provided by the plant.

This symbiosis has been extensively studied in recent decades, and many studies on the communication and the signaling between the two partners at different steps of the symbiosis (from root infection to nodule development) have been elucidated. However, the knowledge about the earlier steps of rhizosphere colonization, namely the opening line at the root surface, remains poorly characterized. Increasing data have shown the importance of intraspecies and multispecies communications among rhizospheric biotic components for improving rhizobia–legumes interaction. In addition, it has been shown that rhizobia are part of the rhizosphere of a wide variety of non-legume plants. They can be plant growth-promoting components, recovering a central role in the plant core microbiome.

== Methods ==
The following are some methods commonly used or of interest in rhizosphere research. Many of these methods include both field testing of the root systems and in-lab testing using simulated environments to perform experiments, such as pH determination.

High-Throughput Sequencing: Amplification and sequencing of marker genes such as 16S rRNA (for bacteria) and Internal Transcribed Spacer (ITS) region (for fungi) to determine microbial community composition and diversity.

Metagenomics and Metatranscriptomics: Shotgun sequencing of total DNA or RNA to assess the genetic potential and active gene expression of the entire rhizosphere microbial community.

Bioinformatics Analysis: Using software pipelines (e.g., QIIME, Mothur) to process sequencing data, calculate diversity indices, and compare community structure across different treatments or conditions.

Functional Prediction: Tools like PICRUSt (Phylogenetic Investigation of Communities by Reconstruction of Unobserved States) for bacteria and FUNGuild for fungi are used to infer the ecological functions of the identified microorganisms based on their taxonomic makeup.

- Culture Depend Approaches
- Root Imaging
- Isotopic labeling
- Enzyme Assays
- Mini rhizotron camera
- Various methods used to determine water movement in the rhizosphere e.g. microelectrodes and agar techniques for pH and microsampling of rhizosphere materials
- Pyrolysis–field ionization mass spectrometry allows for spectrometry of agricultural fields to find fulvic and humic acids and the extraction residues (humins) in certain studies and expanded to general organic compounds in other recent work.

Illustration of the rhizosphere A = amoeba consuming bacteria; BL = energy limited bacteria; BU = non-energy limited bacteria; RC = root derived carbon; SR = sloughed root hair cells; F = fungal hyphae; N = nematode worm.

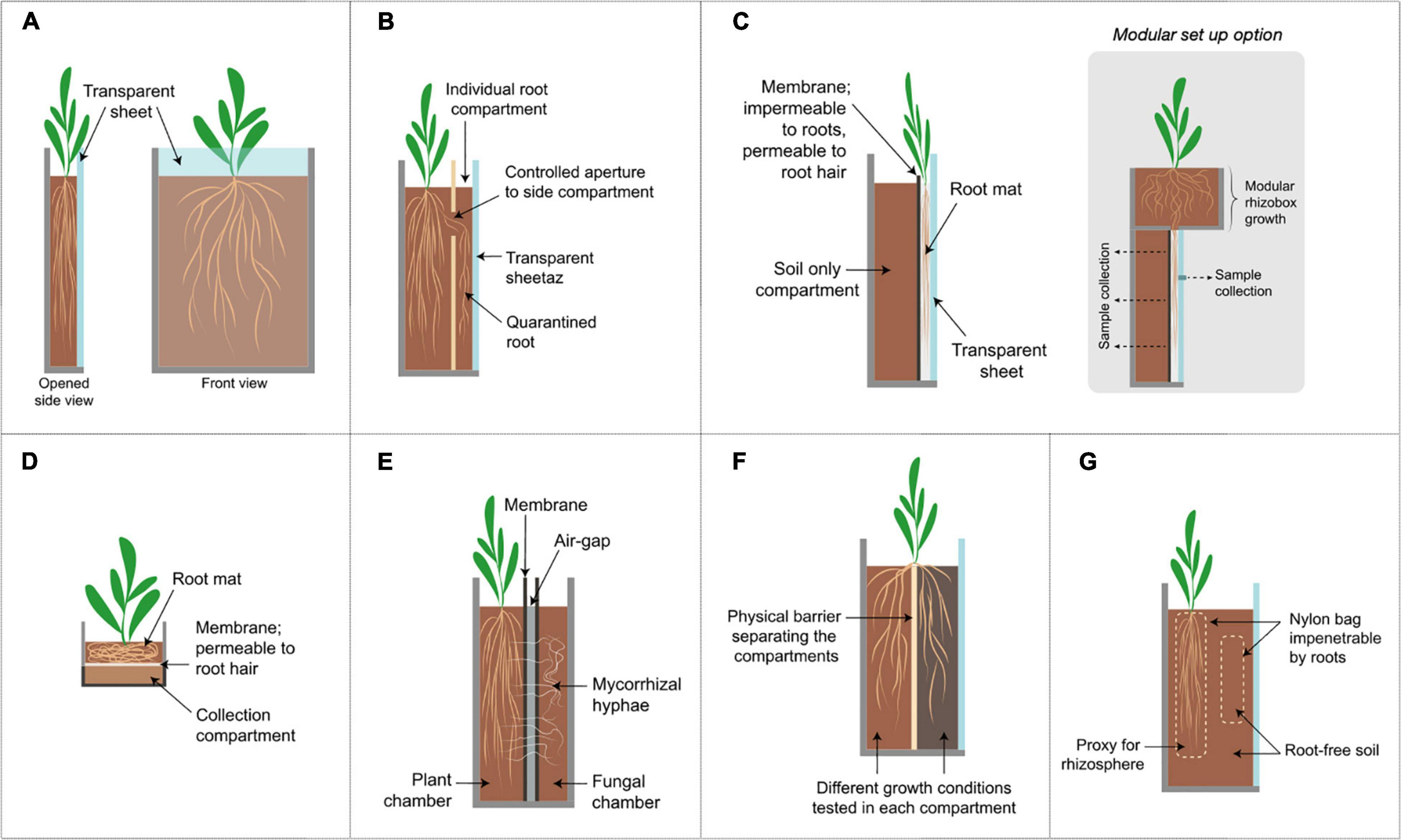
Growth chamber designs for studying rhizosphere interactions (A) Rhizotron/Rhizobox set up, (B) Rhizobox with side-compartment, (C) vertical root mat chambers; a modular option is show where the plant can be pre-grown in a separate compartment and transplanted afterward onto the main examination chamber, inset shows a modular set up option, (D) horizontal root mat in rhizobox, (E) Mycorrhizal compartments, (F) split-root systems shown here in a rhizobox set up; (G) Nylon bag to separate root and root-free soil; roots may be restricted in the bag or the soil may be protected from root penetration by the bag.

== See also ==
- Plant to plant communication via mycorrhizal networks
- Soil biomantle
- Soil respiration
- Rhizobacteria
- Root mucilage
