= Soil ecology =

Study of the interaction of soil and life

Soil ecology studies interactions among soil organisms and their environment. It is a branch of ecology particularly concerned with the cycling of nutrients, soil aggregate formation, and soil biodiversity. Soils are a complex environment made of physical, chemical, and biological entities that frequently interact. Soils support a wide range of bacteria, plants, fungi, and other organisms, making it an essential ecosystem of terrestrial biodiversity.

== Abiotic Components ==
Soil is a heterogenous mixture of minerals and organic matter with variations in structure, nutrients, moisture, temperature, and pH that support different organisms depending on such combinations. Soil is formed through a process known as pedogenesis, the development of which is influenced by five soil forming factors identified by Hans Jenny. These factors are described in an equation known as the Jenny Equation, where climate (cl), organisms (o), relief (r), parent material (p), and time (t) are a function of soil formation.

${\displaystyle s=f(cl,o,r,p,t)}$

=== Structure ===
Soil aggregation is the process of clay, silt, and sand combining together with organic matter over time. Soil structure is influenced by the size, shape, and arrangement of these solid particles. Porosity is affected by minerals and organic matter found in the soil, and aggregation is vital for maintaining it. Moisture levels, root growth, and organisms influence aggregate size and stability in the face of environmental stress. Aggregate formation is also important for protecting soil against excessive erosion and organismal decomposition. Recent research suggests that soil aggregation, which can be impacted in agricultural systems from tilling, affects the bacterial communities present in the soil.

=== Nutrients ===
Soils are sources of plant nutrients that are necessary for plant growth. Nitrogen, phosphorus, and potassium (known as NPK) are the three main nutrients required for plant life. Calcium, magnesium, and sulfur are also important nutrients important for microbial life, as well as other micronutrients such as iron, manganese, zinc, copper, boron, and molybdenum.

Nutrient cycling impacts soil fertility through a number of biogeochemical processes. These cycles help regulate the availability and exchange of nutrients between plants and soils, helping to maintain ecosystem productivity and health. Ecosystem resilience and biodiversity can also be attributed to the availability and diversity of nutrients due to greater plant diversity, which in turn supports more complex food webs. Human land use changes such as farming and urbanization can significantly affect nutrient cycling and microbial communities within soils. Additionally, the overuse of synthetic fertilizers and subsequent runoff from agricultural lands can lead to declines in soil health and fertility and contribute to the eutrophication of adjacent freshwater systems.

=== Microclimate ===
Moisture is a significant limiting factor in terrestrial ecosystems and especially in the soil. Soil organisms are constantly confronted with the problem of dehydration. Soil microbial communities experience shifts in the diversity and composition during dehydration and rehydration cycles. Soil moisture also affects carbon cycling, a phenomenon known as the Birch effect.

Air is vital for respiration in soil organisms and in plant growth. Both wind and atmospheric pressure play critical roles in soil aeration. In addition, convection and diffusion also influence the rates of soil aeration

Temperature variations in soil are influenced by factors such as seasonality, environmental conditions, vegetation, and soil composition. Soil temperature also varies with depth; upper soil layers are majorly influenced by air temperature, while deeper soil layers experience less temperature fluctuation. Soil temperature influences biological and biochemical processes in soil, playing an important role in microbial and enzymatic activities, mineralization, and organic matter decomposition.

== Soil Fauna ==
Soil fauna is crucial to soil formation, litter decomposition, nutrient cycling, biotic regulation, and promotion of plant growth. Yet, soil organisms remain underrepresented in studies on soil processes and existing modeling exercises. This is a consequence of assuming that much below ground diversity is ecologically redundant and that soil food webs exhibit a higher degree of omnivory. However, there is growing evidence on the strong influence of abiotic filters, such as temperature, moisture and soil pH, as well as soil habitat characteristics in controlling their spatial and temporal patterns.

Soils are complex systems and their complexity resides in their heterogeneous nature; they are a mixture of air, water, minerals, organic compounds, and living organisms. The horizontal and vertical spatial variation of all these constituents is related to soil forming agents varying from micro to macro scales. Consequently, the horizontal patchy distribution of soil properties (soil temperature, moisture, pH, litter/nutrient availability, etc.) also drives the patchiness of the soil organisms across the landscape and has been one of the main arguments for explaining the great diversity observed in soil communities. Because soils also show vertical stratification of their elemental constituents along the soil profile as result of microclimate, soil texture, and resource quantity and quality differing between soil horizons, soil communities also change in abundance and structure with soil depth.

The majority of these organisms are aerobic, so the amount of porous space, pore-size distribution, surface area, and oxygen levels are crucial to their life cycles and activities. The smallest creatures (microbes) use the micropores filled with air to grow, whereas other bigger animals require larger macropores or the water film surrounding the soil particles to move in search for food. Therefore, soil textural properties together with water table depth are also important factors regulating their diversity, population sizes, and their vertical stratification. Ultimately, the structure of the soil communities strongly depends on both natural soil forming factors and human activities (agriculture, forestry, urbanization). This helps determine the shape of landscapes in terms of healthy or contaminated, pristine or degraded soils.

=== Macrofauna ===
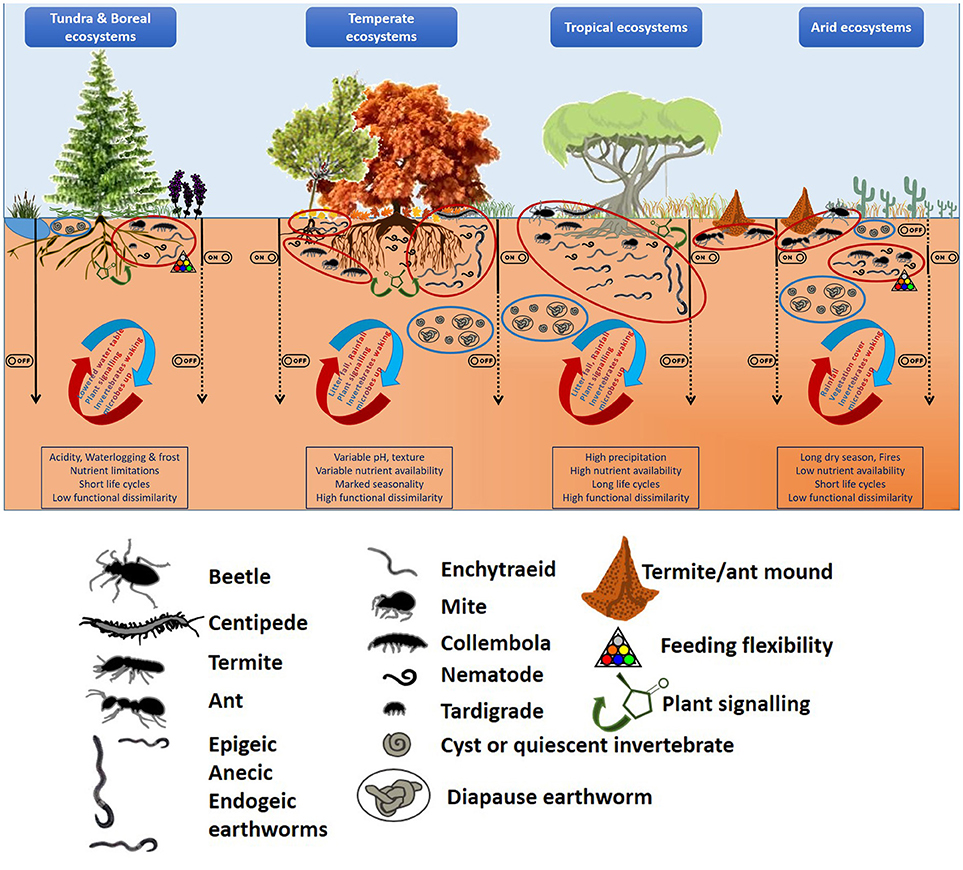
Soil macrofauna, climatic gradients and soil heterogeneity Historical factors, such as climate and soil parent materials, shape landscapes above and below ground, but the regional/local abiotic conditions constraint biological activities. These operate at different spatial and temporal scales and can switch on and off different organisms at different microsites resulting in a hot moment in a particular hotspot. As a result, trophic cascades can occur up and down the food web. Soil invertebrates are shown. Ellipses indicate hot (red) or cold spots (blue), with the curved arrows giving some examples of the factors that could switch on/off a hot moment and the straight black arrows (continuous black line = on, dashed = off) showing the implications for soil processes along the soil profile. In the boxes, the main ecosystem characteristics are listed.

Since all these drivers of biodiversity changes also operate above ground, it is thought that there must be some concordance of mechanisms regulating the spatial patterns and structure of both above and below ground communities. In support of this, a small-scale field study revealed that the relationships between environmental heterogeneity and species richness might be a general property of ecological communities. In contrast, the molecular examination of 17,516 environmental 18S rRNA gene sequences representing 20 phyla of soil animals covering a range of biomes and latitudes around the world indicated otherwise, and the main conclusion from this study was that below-ground animal diversity may be inversely related to above-ground biodiversity.

The lack of distinct latitudinal gradients in soil biodiversity contrasts with those clear global patterns observed for plants above ground and has led to the assumption that they are indeed controlled by different factors. In 2007, Lozupone and Knight found salinity was the major environmental determinant of bacterial diversity composition across the globe, rather than extremes of temperature, pH, or other physical and chemical factors. In another global scale study in 2014, Tedersoo et al. concluded fungal richness is causally unrelated to plant diversity and is better explained by climatic factors, followed by edaphic and spatial patterns. Global patterns of the distribution of macroscopic organisms are far poorer documented. However, the little evidence available appears to indicate that, at large scales, soil metazoans respond to altitudinal, latitudinal, or area gradients in the same way as those described for above-ground organisms. In contrast, at local scales, the great diversity of microhabitats commonly found in soils provides the required niche portioning to create hot spots of diversity in just a gram of soil.

Spatial patterns of soil biodiversity are difficult to explain, and its potential linkages to many soil processes and the overall ecosystem functioning are debated. For example, while some studies have found that reductions in the abundance and presence of soil organisms results in the decline of multiple ecosystem functions, others concluded that above-ground plant diversity alone is a better predictor of ecosystem multi-functionality than soil biodiversity. Soil organisms exhibit a wide array of feeding preferences, life-cycles and survival strategies and they interact within complex food webs. Consequently, species richness per se has very little influence on soil processes and functional dissimilarity can have stronger impacts on ecosystem functioning. Therefore, besides the difficulties in linking above and below ground diversities at different spatial scales, gaining a better understanding of the biotic effects on ecosystem processes might require incorporating a great number of components together with several multi-trophic levels as well as the much less considered non-trophic interactions such as phoresy, passive consumption.) In addition, if soil systems are indeed self-organized, and soil organisms concentrate their activities within a selected set of discrete scales with some form of overall coordination, there is no need for looking for external factors controlling the assemblages of soil constituents. Instead we might just need to recognize the unexpected and that the linkages between above and below ground diversity and soil processes are difficult to predict.

=== Microfauna ===
Recent advances are emerging from studying sub-organism level responses using environmental DNA. Various omics approaches, such as metagenomics, metatranscriptomics, proteomics and proteogenomics, are rapidly advancing, at least for the microbial world. Metaphenomics has been proposed recently as a better way to encompass the omics and the environmental constraints.

=== Soil microbes ===
Soil harbors many microbes: bacteria, archaea, protist, fungi, and viruses. A majority of these microbes have not been cultured and remain undescribed. Development of next generation sequencing technologies open up the avenue to investigate microbial diversity in soil. One feature of soil microbes is spatial separation, which influences microbe to microbe interactions and ecosystem functioning in the soil habitat. Microorganisms in soil are found to be concentrated in specific sites called 'hot spots,' which are characterized by an abundance of resources such as moisture or nutrients. Examples include the rhizosphere and areas with accumulated organic matter such as the detritusphere. These areas are characterized by the presence of decaying root litter and exudates released from plant roots which regulates the availability of carbon and nitrogen and in consequence modulate microbial processes.

Apart from labile organic carbon, spatial separation of microbes in soil may be influenced by other environmental factors such as temperature and moisture. Other abiotic factors like pH and mineral nutrient composition may also influence the distribution of microorganisms in soil. Variability of these factors make soil a dynamic system. Interactions between members of the soil microhabitat take place via chemical signaling, which is mediated by soluble metabolites and volatile organic compounds in addition to extracellular polysaccharides. Chemical signals enable microbes to interact; for example, bacterial peptidoglycans stimulate growth of Candida albicans. Reciprocally, C. albicans production of farnesol modulates the expression of virulence genes and influences bacterial quorum sensing. Trophic interactions by microbes in the same environment is driven by molecular communication. Microbes may also exchange metabolites to support each other's growth, e.g. the release of extracellular enzymes by ectomycorrhiza decomposes organic matter, and release nutrients which then benefit other members of the population. In exchange, organic acids from bacteria stimulate fungal growth These examples of trophic interactions, especially metabolite dependencies, drive species interactions and are important in the assembly of soil microbial communities.

== Soil food web ==
Diverse organisms make up the soil food web. They range in size from one-celled bacteria, algae, fungi, and protozoa, to more complex nematodes and micro-arthropods, to the visible earthworms, insects, small vertebrates, and plants. As these organisms eat, grow, and move through the soil, they make it possible to have clean water, clean air, healthy plants, and moderated water flow.

There are many ways that the soil food web is an integral part of landscape processes. Soil organisms decompose organic compounds, including manure, plant residues, and pesticides, preventing them from entering water and becoming pollutants. They sequester nitrogen and other nutrients that might otherwise enter groundwater, and they fix nitrogen from the atmosphere, making it available to plants. Many organisms enhance soil aggregation and porosity, thus increasing infiltration and reducing surface runoff. Soil organisms also prey on crop pests and are food for above-ground animals.

== Research ==
Research interests span many aspects of soil ecology and microbiology. Fundamentally, researchers are interested in understanding the interplay among microorganisms, fauna, and plants; the biogeochemical processes they carry out; and the physical environment in which their activities take place. Researchers apply this knowledge to address environmental problems. Notable scientific journals publishing current scientific research on soil ecology include Applied Soil Ecology, Soil Ecology Letters, and npj Soil Ecology.

Current research in soil ecology is investigating the biogeochemistry and microbial ecology of septic drain field soils used to treat domestic wastewater, the role of anecic earthworms in controlling the movement of water and nitrogen cycle in agricultural soils, and the assessment of soil quality in turf production.

As of 2006, one research topic of particular interest is understanding the roles and functions of arbuscular mycorrhizal fungi in natural ecosystems. The effect of anthropic soil conditions on arbuscular mycorrhizal fungi and the production of glomalin by arbuscular mycorrhizal fungi are both of interest due to their roles in sequestering atmospheric carbon dioxide.

== See also ==
Anoxic microsites in soil

== Bibliography ==
- Adl, M.S. (2003). Adl, S. M (ed.). The Ecology of Soil Decomposition. CABI, UK. doi:10.1079/9780851996615.0000. ISBN 978-0-85199-661-5.
- Coleman, D.C. & D.A. Crorsley, Jr. (2004). Fundamentals of Soil Ecology (2nd ed.). Academic Press. ISBN 978-0-12-179726-3.
- Killham, 1994, Soil Ecology, Cambridge University Press
- Metting, 1993,Soil Microbial Ecology, Marcel Dekker
