= Forest floor =

Part of the forest ecosystem

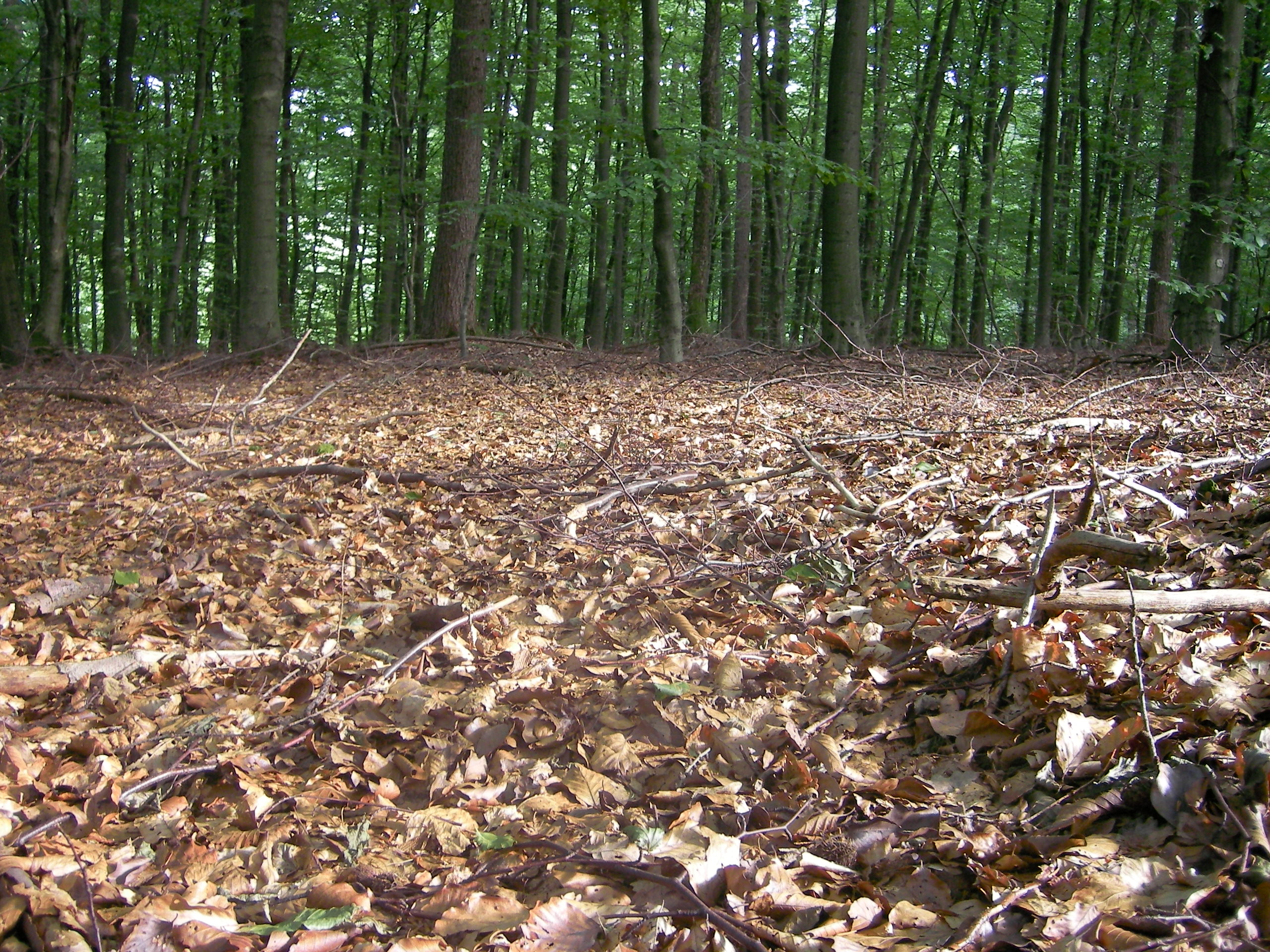
floor of a temperate broadleaf forest showing leaf litter.

The forest floor, also called detritus or duff, is the part of a forest ecosystem that mediates between the living, aboveground portion of the forest and the mineral/humus-rich soil, principally composed of decaying plant litter and other dead plant matters such as coarse woody debris. In some countries, like Canada, forest floor refers to L, F and H organic horizons. It hosts a wide variety of decomposers and predators, including invertebrates, fungi, algae, bacteria, and archaea.

The forest floor serves as a bridge between the above ground living vegetation and the soil, and thus is a crucial component in nutrient transfer through the biogeochemical cycle. Leaf litter and other plant litter transmits nutrients from plants to the soil. The plant litter of the forest floor (or L horizon) prevents erosion, conserves moisture, and provides nutrients to the entire ecosystem. The F horizon consists of plant material in which decomposition is apparent, but the origins of plant residues are still distinguishable. The H horizon consists of well-decomposed plant material so that plant residues are not recognizable, with the exception of some roots or wood.

The nature of the distinction between organisms "in" the soil and components "of" the soil is disputed, with some questioning whether such a distinction exists at all. The majority of carbon storage and biomass production in forests occurs below ground. Despite this, conservation policy and scientific study tends to neglect the below-ground portion of the forest ecosystem. As a crucial part of soil and the below-ground ecosystem, the forest floor profoundly impacts the entire forest.

Much of the energy and carbon fixed by forests is periodically added to the forest floor through litterfall, and a substantial portion of the nutrient requirements of forest ecosystems is supplied by decomposition of organic matter in the forest floor and soil surface. Decomposers, such as arthropods and fungi, are necessary for the transformation of dead organic matter to usable nutrients. The sustained productivity of forests is closely linked with the decomposition of shed plant parts, particularly the nutrient-rich foliage. The forest floor is also an important fuel source in forest fires.

== Variation ==
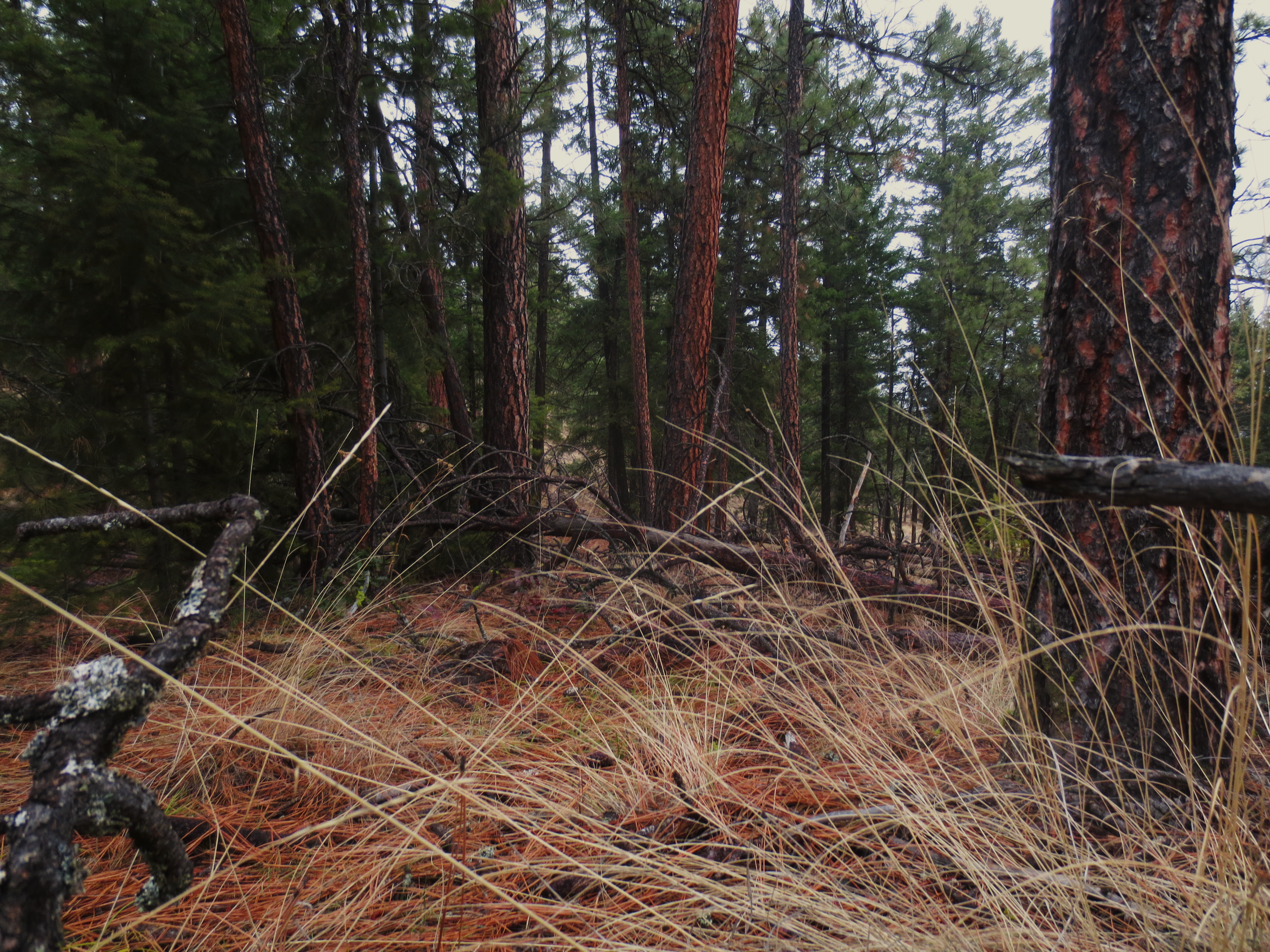
Boreal Forest Floor in the Okanagan, British Columbia

The amount of material in the forest floor depends on the balance between inputs from litter production and outputs from decomposition, and amounts also reflect the site's disturbance history. Both litter production and decomposition are functions of the site (e.g., wet versus dry; cold versus warm; nutrient rich versus nutrient poor) and the vegetation that occupies the site (e.g., conifer versus broadleaf). A site's forest floor is determined by its areal weight, depth, and nutrient content. Typically, forest floors are heaviest and deepest in boreal forests and mountain forests where decomposition rates are slow. In contrast, the lightest and thinnest forest floors usually occur in tropical forests where decomposition rates are rapid, except on white sands where nutrients could not be supplied from mineral weathering.

=== Temperate forests ===
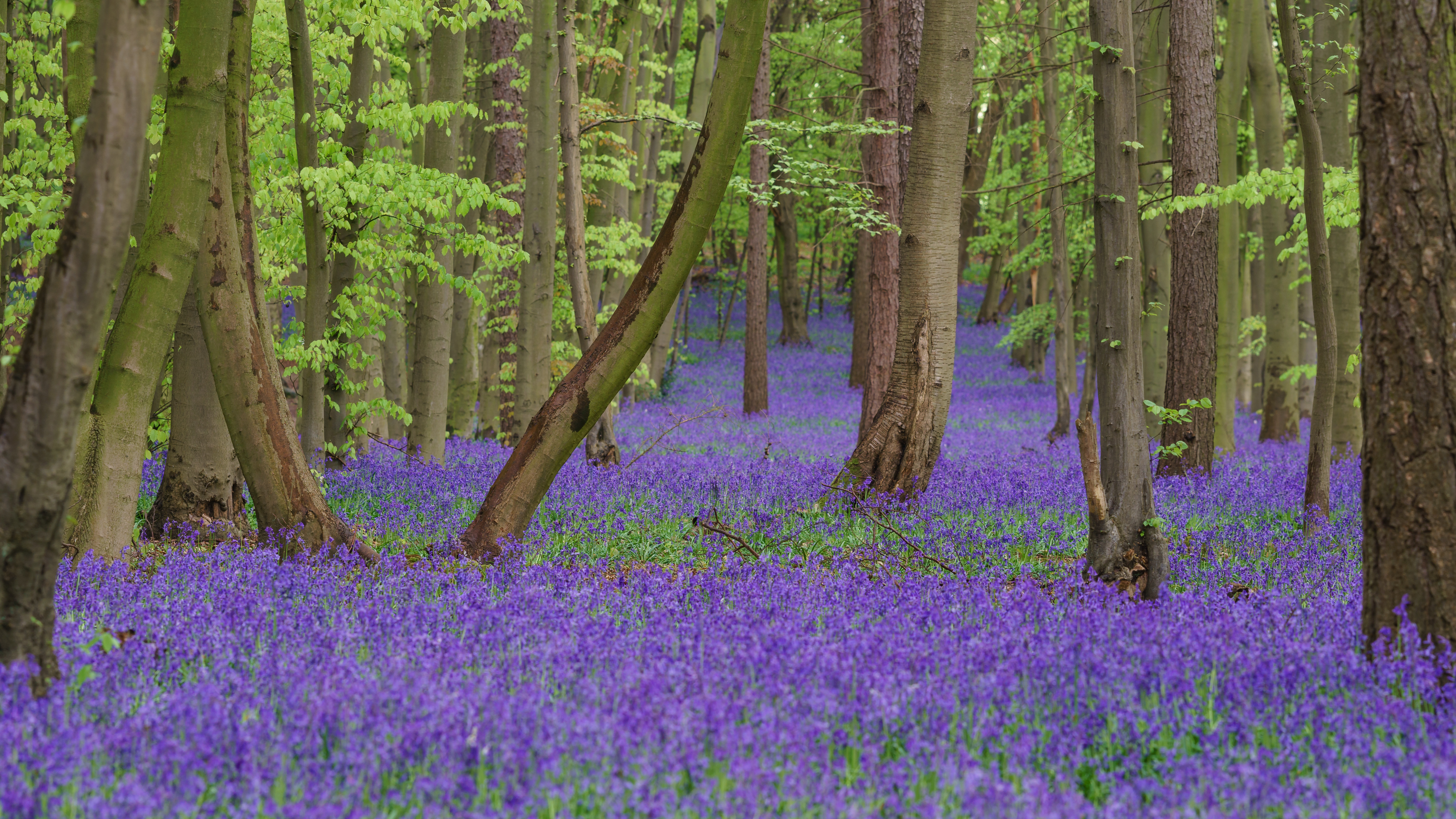
Bluebells (Hyacinthoides non-scripta, Pryor's Wood, Stevenage)

The organic layer is divided into three layers: on the surface is the leaf litter formed by undecomposed vegetable matter; underneath is humus which is the product of decomposed vegetable matter. Between litter and humus is a partially decomposed layer of organic matter ("F: fragmented organic materials"). Some specialists consider this zone to be equivalent to the soil horizon (O) whereas for others, this only includes the humus and the intermediate layer, excluding the litter. Woodland plants that inhabit this zone often have bulbs or rhizomes and include ferns such as bracken, monocots such as bluebells and dog's mercury.

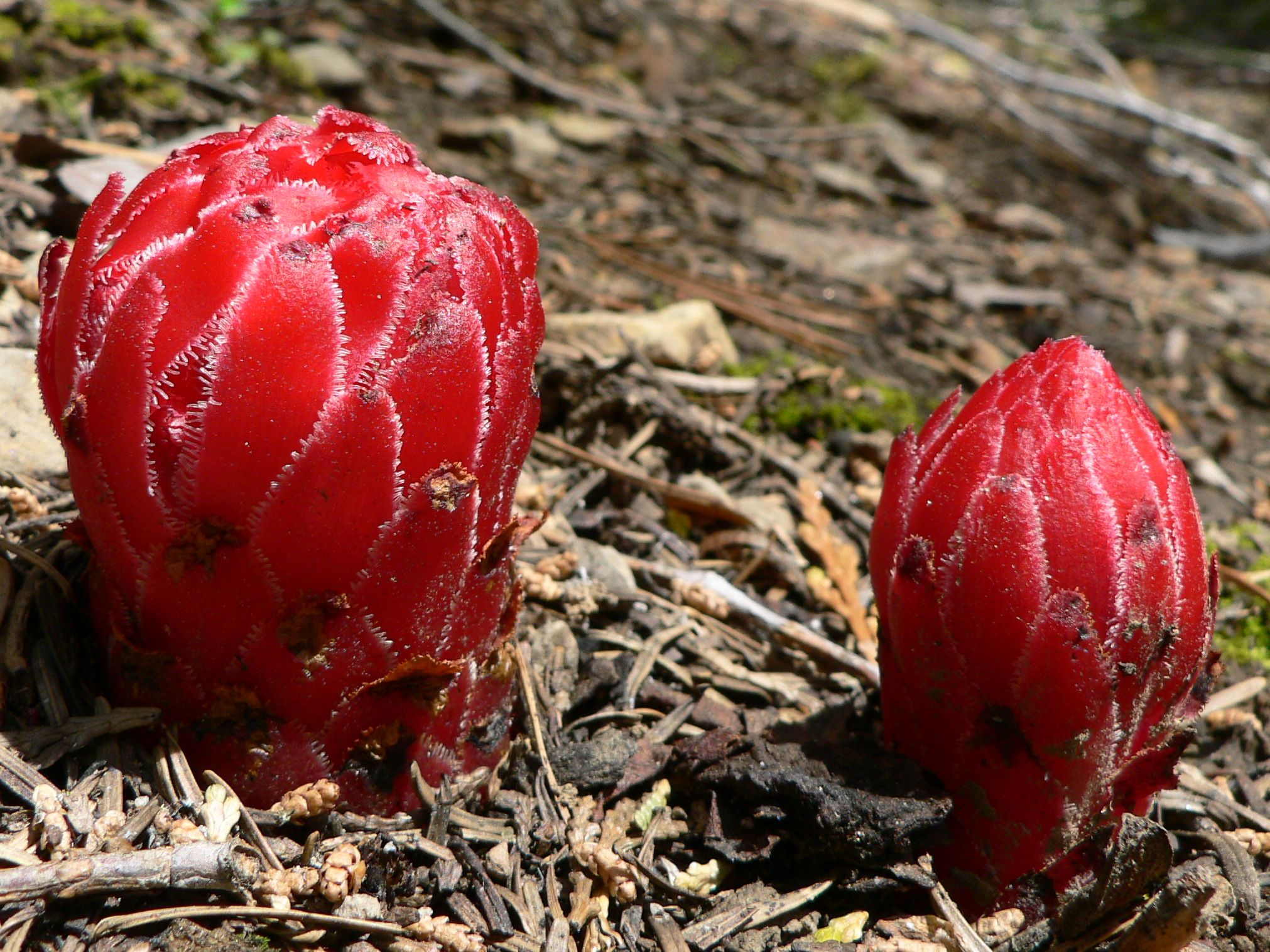
Sarcodes sanguinea: a parasitic plant obtaining nutrients from mycorrhizal fungi of tree roots (N. America).

=== Tropical forests ===
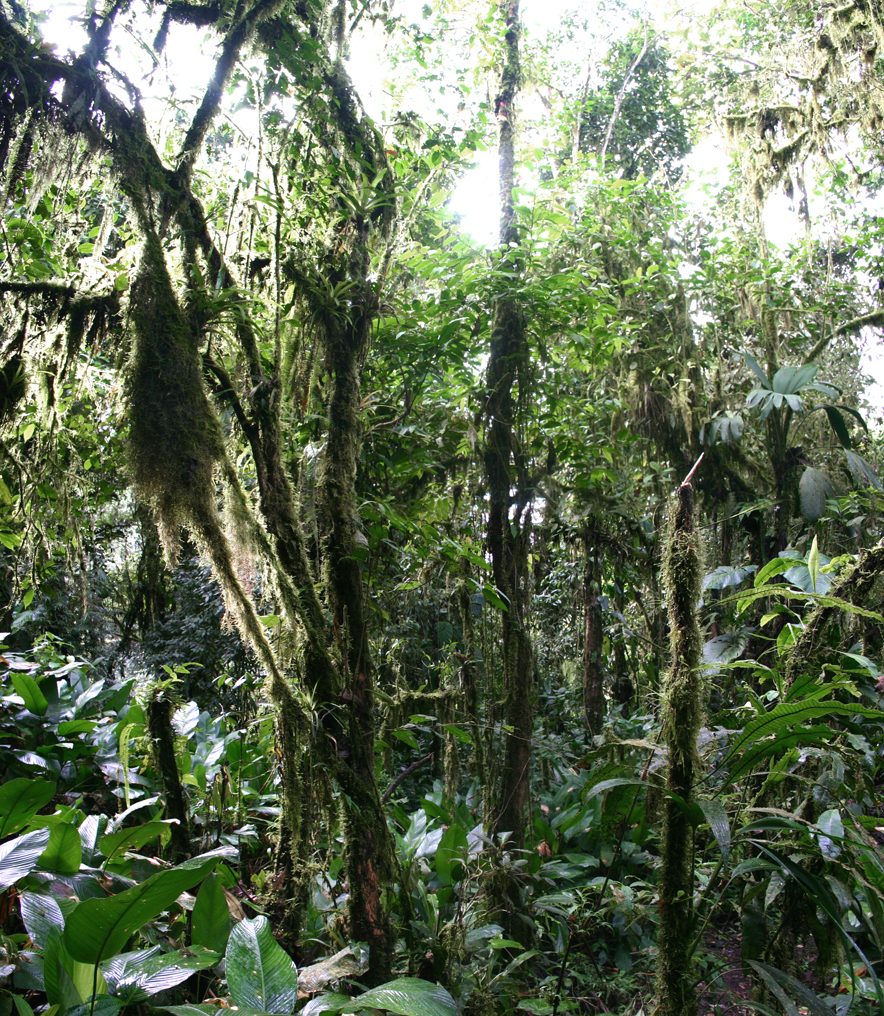
Cloud forest (Ecuador)

In tropical rainforests, the soil itself is often very poor, in contrast to the soils of temperate forests which store nutrients in soil. The lush vegetation is made possible by the abundance and rapid action of termites, millipedes and other organisms, which break down organic matter and promptly consign it to the mycorrhizal network. Therefore, the leaf litter layer of tropical forests may be considerably less apparent, or virtually absent at certain times of the year. With up to three defined canopy layers above, relatively low levels of sunlight (as little as 2%) reach here. Examples of the wide range of plants adapted to this zone include: spike mosses, gingers and the parasitic Rafflesia spp.

== See also ==
- Coarse woody debris
- Mycorrhizal fungi and soil carbon storage
- Plant litter
- Stratification
