= Soil food web =

Complex living system in the soil

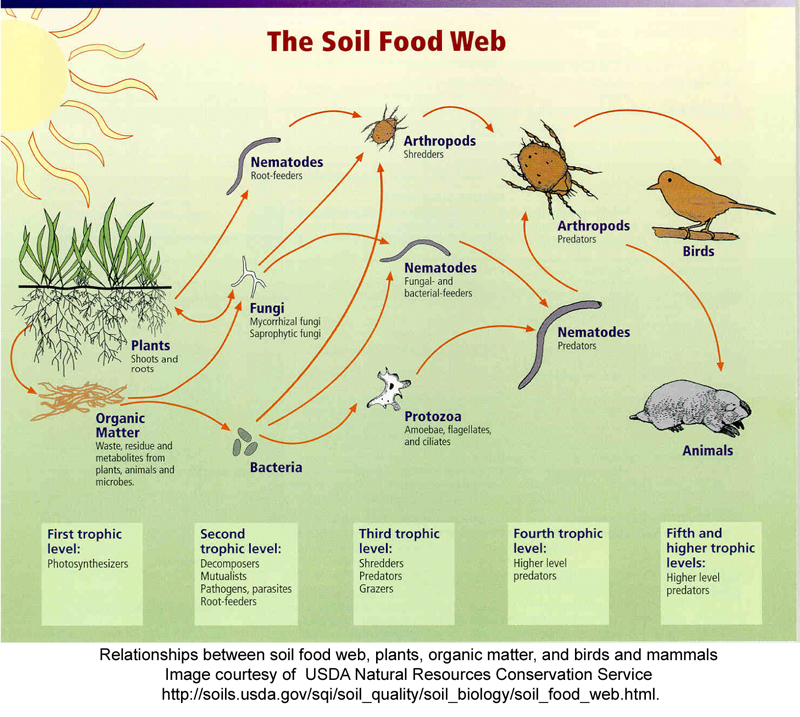
An example of a topological food web (image courtesy of USDA)

The soil food web is the community of organisms living all or part of their lives in the soil. It describes a complex living system in the soil and how it interacts with the environment, plants, and animals.

Food webs describe the transfer of energy between species in an ecosystem. While a food chain examines one linear energy pathway through an ecosystem, a food web is more complex and illustrates all of the potential pathways. Much of this transferred energy comes from the sun. Plants use the sun’s energy to convert inorganic compounds into energy-rich, organic compounds, turning carbon dioxide and minerals into plant material by photosynthesis. Plant flowers exude energy-rich nectar above ground and plant roots exude acids, sugars, and ectoenzymes into the rhizosphere, adjusting the pH and feeding the food web underground.

Plants are called autotrophs because they make their own energy; they are also called producers because they produce energy available for other organisms to eat. Heterotrophs are consumers that cannot make their own food. In order to obtain energy they eat plants or other heterotrophs.

== Above ground food webs ==
In above ground food webs, energy moves from producers (plants) to primary consumers (herbivores) and then to secondary consumers (predators). The phrase, trophic level, refers to the different levels or steps in the energy pathway. In other words, the producers, consumers, and decomposers are the main trophic levels. This chain of energy transferring from one species to another can continue several more times, but eventually ends. At the end of the food chain, decomposers such as bacteria and fungi break down dead plant and animal material into simple nutrients.

== Methodology ==
The nature of soil makes direct observation of food webs difficult. Since soil organisms range in size from less than 0.1 mm (nematodes) to greater than 2 mm (earthworms) there are many different ways to extract them. Soil samples are often taken using a metal core. Larger macrofauna such as earthworms and insect larva can be removed by hand, but this is impossible for smaller nematodes and soil arthropods. Most methods to extract small organisms are dynamic; they depend on the ability of the organisms to move out of the soil. For example, a Berlese funnel, used to collect small arthropods, creates a light/heat gradient in the soil sample. As the microarthropods move down, away from the light and heat, they fall through a funnel and into a collection vial. A similar method, the Baermann funnel, is used for nematodes. The Baerman funnel is wet, however (while the Berlese funnel is dry) and does not depend on a light/heat gradient. Nematodes move out of the soil and to the bottom of the funnel because, as they move, they are denser than water and are unable to swim. Soil microbial communities are characterized in many different ways. The activity of microbes can be measured by their respiration and carbon dioxide release. The cellular components of microbes can be extracted from soil and genetically profiled, or microbial biomass can be calculated by weighing the soil before and after fumigation.

== Types of food webs ==
An example of a soil interaction web. Image courtesy of Kalessin11.

There are three different types of food web representations: topological (or traditional) food webs, flow webs and interaction webs. These webs can describe systems both above and below ground.

=== Topological webs ===
Early food webs were topological; they were descriptive and provided a nonquantitative picture of consumers, resources and the links between them. Pimm et al. (1991) described these webs as a map of which organisms in a community eat which other kinds. The earliest topological food web, made in 1912, examined the predators and parasites of cotton boll weevil (reviewed by Pimm et al. 1991). Researchers analyzed and compared topological webs between ecosystems by measuring the web’s interaction chain lengths and connectivity. One problem faced in standardizing such measurements is that there are often too many species for each to have a separate box. Depending on the author, the number of species aggregated or separated into functional groups may be different. Authors may even eliminate some organisms. By convention, the dead material flowing back to detritus is not shown, as it would complicate the figure, but it is taken account in any calculations.

== Flow webs ==
Miosis build on interconnected food chains, adding quantitative information on the movement of carbon or other nutrients from producers to consumers. Hunt et al. (1987) published the first flow web for soil, describing the short grass prairie in Colorado, USA. The authors estimated nitrogen transferral rates through the soil food web and calculated nitrogen mineralization rates for a range of soil organisms. In another landmark study, researchers from the Lovinkhoeve Experimental Farm in the Netherlands examined the flow of carbon and illustrated transfer rates with arrows of different thicknesses.

In order to create a flow web, a topological web is first constructed. After the members of the web are decided, the biomass of each functional group is calculated, usually in kg carbon/hectare. In order to calculate feeding rates, researchers assume that the population of the functional group is in equilibrium. At equilibrium, the reproduction of the group balances the rate at which members are lost through natural death and predation When feeding rate is known, the efficiency with which nutrients are converted into organism biomass can be calculated. This energy stored in the organism represents the amount available to be passed on to the next trophic level.

After constructing the first soil flow webs, researchers discovered that nutrients and energy flowed from lower resources to higher trophic levels through three main channels. The bacterial and fungal channels had the largest energy flow, while the herbivory channel, in which organisms directly consumed plant roots, was smaller. It is now widely recognized that bacteria and fungi are critical to the decomposition of carbon and nitrogen and play important roles in both the carbon cycle and nitrogen cycle.

=== Interaction web ===
An interaction web, shown above right, is similar to a topological web, but instead of showing the movement of energy or materials, the arrows show how one group influences another. In interaction food web models, every link has two direct effects, one of the resource on the consumer and one of the consumer on the resource. The effect of the resource on the consumer is positive, (the consumer gets to eat) and the effect on the resource by the consumer is negative (it is eaten). These direct, trophic, effects can lead to indirect effects. Indirect effects, represented by dashed lines, show the effect of one element on another to which it is not directly linked. For example, in the simple interaction web below, when the predator eats the root herbivore, the plant eaten by the herbivore may increase in biomass. We would then say that the predator has a beneficial indirect effect on the plant roots.

== Food web control ==
=== Bottom-up effects ===
Bottom-up effects occur when the density of a resource affects the density of its consumer. For example, in the figure above, an increase in root density causes an increase in herbivore density that causes a corresponding increase in predator density. Correlations in abundance or biomass between consumers and their resources give evidence for bottom-up control. An often-cited example of a bottom-up effect is the relationship between herbivores and the primary productivity of plants. In terrestrial ecosystems, the biomass of herbivores and detritivores increases with primary productivity. An increase in primary productivity will result in a larger influx of leaf litter into the soil ecosystem, which will provide more resources for bacterial and fungal populations to grow. More microbes will allow an increase in bacterial and fungal feeding nematodes, which are eaten by mites and other predatory nematodes. Thus, the entire food web swells as more resources are added to the base. When ecologists use the term, bottom-up control, they are indicating that the biomass, abundance, or diversity of higher trophic levels depend on resources from lower trophic levels.

=== Top-down effects ===
Ideas about top-down control are much more difficult to evaluate. Top-down effects occur when the population density of a consumer affects that of its resource; for example, a predator affects the density of its prey. Top-down control, therefore, refers to situations where the abundance, diversity or biomass of lower trophic levels depends on effects from consumers at higher trophic levels. A trophic cascade is a type of top-down interaction that describes the indirect effects of predators. In a trophic cascade, predators induce effects that cascade down food chain and affect biomass of organisms at least two links away.

The importance of trophic cascades and top-down control in terrestrial ecosystems is actively debated in ecology (reviewed in Shurin et al. 2006) and the issue of whether trophic cascades occur in soils is no less complex Trophic cascades do occur in both the bacterial and fungal energy channels. However, cascades may be infrequent, because many other studies show no top-down effects of predators. In Mikola and Setälä’s study, microbes eaten by nematodes grew faster when they were grazed upon frequently. This compensatory growth slowed when the microbe feeding nematodes were removed. Therefore, although top predators reduced the number of microbe feeding nematodes, there was no overall change in microbial biomass.

Besides the grazing effect, another barrier to top down control in soil ecosystems is widespread omnivory, which by increasing the number of trophic interactions, dampens effects from the top. The soil environment is also a matrix of different temperatures, moistures and nutrient levels, and many organisms are able to become dormant to withstand difficult times. Depending on conditions, predators may be separated from their potential prey by an insurmountable amount of space and time.

Any top-down effects that do occur will be limited in strength because soil food webs are donor controlled. Donor control means that consumers have little or no effect on the renewal or input of their resources. For example, aboveground herbivores can overgraze an area and decrease the grass population, but decomposers cannot directly influence the rate of falling plant litter. They can only indirectly influence the rate of input into their system through nutrient recycling which, by helping plants to grow, eventually creates more litter and detritus to fall. If the entire soil food web were completely donor controlled, however, bacterivores and fungivores would never greatly affect the bacteria and fungi they consume.

While bottom-up effects are no doubt important, many soil ecologists suspect that top-down effects are also sometimes significant. Certain predators or parasites, when added to the soil, can have a large effect on root herbivores and thereby indirectly affect plant fitness. For example, in a coastal shrubland food chain the native entomopathogenic nematode, Heterorhabditis marelatus, parasitized ghost moth caterpillars, and ghost moth caterpillars consumed the roots of bush lupine. The presence of H. marelatus correlated with lower caterpillar numbers and healthier plants. In addition, the researchers observed high mortality of bush lupine in the absence of entomopathogenic nematodes. These results implied that the nematode, as a natural enemy of the ghost moth caterpillar, protected the plant from damage. The authors even suggested that the interaction was strong enough to affect the population dynamics of bush lupine; this was supported in later experimental work with naturally-growing populations of bush lupine.

Top down control has applications in agriculture and is the principle behind biological control, the idea that plants can benefit from the application of their herbivore’s enemies. While wasps and ladybugs are commonly associated with biological control, parasitic nematodes and predatory mites are also added to the soil to suppress pest populations and preserve crop plants. In order to use such biological control agents effectively, a knowledge of the local soil food web is important.

== Community matrix models ==
A community matrix model is a type of interaction web that uses differential equations to describe every link in the topological web. Using Lotka–Volterra equations, that describe predator-prey interactions, and food web energetics data such as biomass and feeding rate, the strength of interactions between groups is calculated. Community matrix models can also show how small changes affect the overall stability of the web.

== Stability of food webs ==
Mathematical modeling in food webs has raised the question of whether complex or simple food webs are more stable. Until the last decade, it was believed that soil food webs were relatively simple, with low degrees of connectance and omnivory. These ideas stemmed from the mathematical models of May which predicted that complexity destabilized food webs. May used community matrices in which species were randomly linked with random interaction strength to show that local stability decreases with complexity (measured as connectance), diversity, and average interaction strength among species.

The use of such random community matrices attracted much criticism. In other areas of ecology, it was realized that the food webs used to make these models were grossly oversimplified and did not represent the complexity of real ecosystems. It also became clear that soil food webs did not conform to these predictions. Soil ecologists discovered that omnivory in food webs was common, and that food chains could be long and complex and still remain resistant to disturbance by drying, freezing, and fumigation.

But why are complex food webs more stable? Many of the barriers to top-down trophic cascades also promote stability. Complex food webs may be more stable if the interaction strengths are weak and soil food webs appear to consist of many weak interactions and a few strong ones. Donor controlled food webs may be inherently more stable, because it is difficult for primary consumers to overtax their resources. The structure of the soil also acts as a buffer, separating organisms and preventing strong interactions. Many soil organisms, for example bacteria, can remain dormant through difficult times and reproduce quickly once conditions improve, making them resilient to disturbance.

Stability of the system is reduced by the use of nitrogen-containing inorganic and organic fertilizers, which cause soil acidification.

== Interactions not included in food webs ==
Despite their complexity, some interactions between species in the soil are not easily classified by food webs. Litter transformers, mutualists, and ecosystem engineers all have strong impacts on their communities that cannot be characterized as either top-down or bottom-up.

Litter transformers, such as isopods, consume dead plants and excrete fecal pellets. While on the surface this may not seem impressive, the fecal pellets are moister and higher in nutrients than the surrounding soil, which favors colonization by bacteria and fungi. Decomposition of the fecal pellet by the microbes increases its nutrient value and the isopod is able to re-ingest the pellets. When the isopods consume nutrient-poor litter, the microbes enrich it for them and isopods prevented from eating their own feces can die. This mutualistic relationship has been called an “external rumen”, similar to the mutualistic relationship between bacteria and cows. While the bacterial symbionts of cows live inside the rumen of their stomach, isopods depend on microbes outside their body.

Ecosystems engineers, such as earthworms, modify their environment and create habitat for other smaller organisms. Earthworms also stimulate microbial activity by increasing soil aeration and moisture, and transporting litter into the ground where it becomes available to other soil fauna. Fungi create nutritional niche for other organisms by enriching nutritionally extremely scarce food – the dead wood. This allows xylophages to develop and in turn affect dead wood, contributing to wood decomposition and nutrient cycling in the forest floor. In aboveground and aquatic food webs, the literature assumes that the most important interactions are competition and predation. While soil food webs fit these sorts of interactions well, future research needs to include more complex interactions such as mutualisms and habitat modification.

While they cannot characterize all interactions, soil food webs remain a useful tool for describing ecosystems. The interactions between species in the soil and their effect on decomposition continue to be well studied, but much remains unknown about soil food webs stability and how food webs change over time. This knowledge is critical to understanding how food webs affect important qualities such as soil fertility.

== See also ==
- Soil biology
- Soil ecology
- Soil functions
- Soil life
- Trophic cascade
- Food web
- Entomopathogenic nematode
