= Mucigel =

Mucigel is a slimy substance that covers the root cap of the roots of plants. It is a highly hydrated polysaccharide, most likely a pectin, which is secreted from the outermost (epidermal) cells of the rootcap. Mucigel is formed in the Golgi bodies of such cells, and is secreted through the process of exocytosis. The layer of microorganism-rich soil surrounding the mucigel is called the rhizosphere.

Mucigel serves several functions, including:

- Protection of rootcap; prevents desiccation
- Lubrication of rootcap; allows root to more efficiently penetrate the soil
- Creation of symbiotic environment for nitrogen fixing bacteria (i.e. diazotrophs) and fungi (which help with water absorption)
- Provision of a 'diffusion bridge' between the fine root system and soil particles, which allows for a more efficient uptake of water and mineral nutrients by roots in dry soils.

Mucigel is composed of mucilage, microbial exopolysaccharides and glomalin proteins.

== See also ==
- Meristem
