= Soil biology =

Study of living things in soil

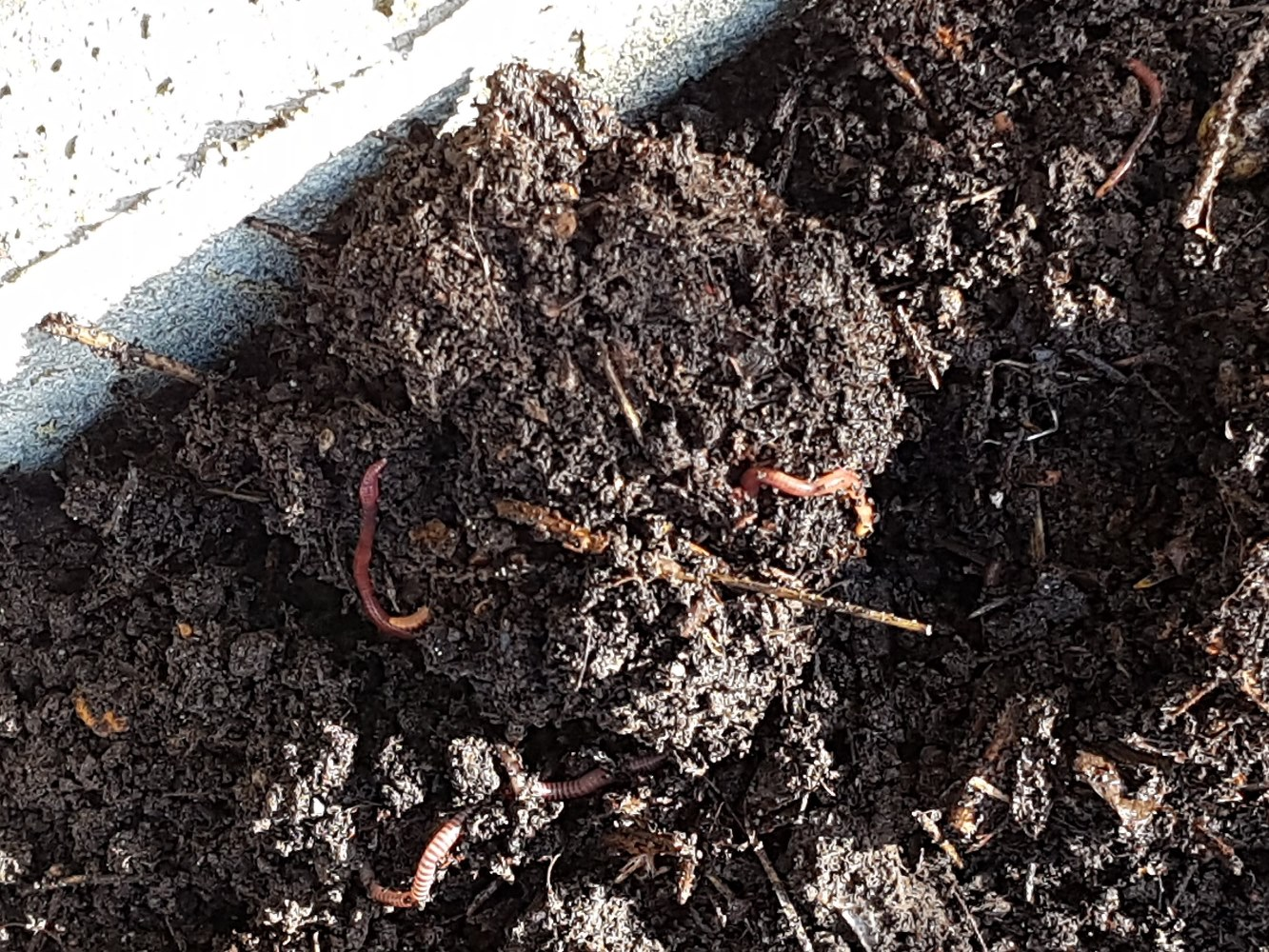
Soil biology is the study of microbial and faunal activity in the soil. This photo shows the activity of both.

Soil biology is the study of microbial and faunal activity and ecology in soil. Soil life, soil biota, soil fauna, or edaphon is a collective term that encompasses all organisms that spend a significant portion of their life cycle within a soil profile, or at the soil-litter interface. These organisms include earthworms, nematodes, protozoa, fungi, bacteria, different arthropods, as well as some reptiles (such as snakes), and species of burrowing mammals like gophers, moles and prairie dogs. Soil biology plays a vital role in determining many soil characteristics. The decomposition of organic matter by soil organisms has an immense influence on soil fertility, plant growth, soil structure, and carbon storage. As a relatively new science, much remains unknown about soil biology and its effect on soil ecosystems.

== Overview ==
The soil is home to circa 59% of the world's biodiversity. The links between soil organisms and soil functions are complex. The interconnectedness and complexity of this soil 'food web' means any appraisal of soil function must necessarily take into account interactions with the living communities that exist within the soil. Soil organisms break down organic matter, making nutrients available for uptake by plants and other organisms. The nutrients stored in the bodies of soil organisms prevent nutrient loss by leaching, in particular for nitrogen and phosphorus. Microbial exudates act to maintain soil structure, and earthworms are important in bioturbation. However, critical aspects about how these populations function and interact are unclear. The discovery of glomalin in 1996 indicates that the knowledge to correctly answer some of the most basic questions about the biogeochemical cycle in soils is lacking. There is much work ahead to gain a better understanding of the ecological role of soil biological components in the biosphere.

In balanced soil, plants grow in an active and steady environment. The nutrient content of the soil and its structure are important for plant well-being, but it is soil life that powers nutrient cycles and provides soil fertility. Without the activities of soil organisms, organic materials would accumulate as undecayed litter at the soil surface, and there would be no humus and no nutrients available for plants.

The soil biota includes:

- Megafauna: size range – 20 mm upward, e.g. moles, rabbits, and rodents.
- Macrofauna: size range – 2 to 20 mm, e.g. woodlice, earthworms, beetles, millipedes, slugs, snails, ants, and harvestmen.
- Mesofauna: size range – 100 micrometres to 2 mm, e.g. tardigrades, mites, enchytraeids and springtails.
- Microfauna and Microflora: size range – 1 to 100 micrometres, e.g. yeasts, bacteria, archaea, fungi, protozoa, nematodes, and rotifers.

Of these, bacteria, archaea and fungi play key roles in maintaining a healthy soil. They act as decomposers that break down organic materials to produce detritus and other breakdown products. Burrowing soil detritivores, like earthworms, known as ecosystem engineers, ingest detritus and decompose it, while building a good granular soil structure and offering a habitat for various soil organisms. Saprotrophs, well represented by fungi, archaea and bacteria, extract soluble nutrients from detritus and soil organic matter, in particular in the rhizosphere. All other organisms living in the soil, each at its position along interconnected trophic networks (also called foodwebs), contribute to good health of the soil ecosystem.

== Scope ==
Soil biology involves work in the following areas:

- Modelling of biological processes and population dynamics
- Soil biology, physics and chemistry: influence of physicochemical parameters and surface properties on biological processes and population behavior
- Population biology and molecular ecology: methodological development and contribution to study microbial and faunal populations; diversity and population dynamics; genetic transfers, influence of environmental factors
- Community ecology and functioning processes: interactions between organisms and mineral or organic compounds; involvement of such interactions in soil pathogenicity; transformation of mineral and organic compounds, cycling of elements; soil structuration

Complementary disciplinary approaches are necessarily utilized which involve molecular biology, genetics, ecophysiology, biogeography, ecology, soil processes, organic matter, nutrient cycling and landscape ecology.

== Bacteria ==
Bacteria are single-cell organisms and the most numerous denizens of agricultural fields, with populations ranging from 100 million to 3 billion in a 'teaspoon' of productive soil. They are capable of very rapid reproduction by binary fission (dividing into two) in favourable conditions. When in its exponential phase of growth Escherichia coli is thus capable of producing 1 milliard more in just 1 hour. Most soil bacteria live close to plant roots in the rhizosphere and are often referred to as rhizobacteria, helping plants to grow. Bacteria live in soil water, including the film of moisture surrounding soil particles, where some are able to swim by means of flagella. The majority of the beneficial soil-dwelling bacteria need oxygen (and are thus termed aerobic bacteria), whilst those that do not require air are referred to as anaerobic, and tend to cause putrefaction of dead organic matter. Aerobic bacteria are most active in a soil that is moist (but not saturated, as this will deprive aerobic bacteria of the air that they require), and neutral soil pH, and where there is plenty of food available (carbohydrates and micronutrients from organic matter). Hostile conditions will not completely kill bacteria; rather, the bacteria will stop growing and get into a dormant stage, often in the form of clay-coated quiescent colonies, and those individuals with pre-adaptive mutations or rapidly evolving better-adapted traits may compete better in the new conditions. Some Gram-positive bacteria (e.g. Bacillus, Clostridium) produce spores in order to wait for more favourable circumstances, and Gram-negative bacteria get into a "nonculturable" resting stage. Bacteria are colonized by persistent viral agents (bacteriophages) that replicate in bacterial hosts and promote gene transfer, a property of bacteria-virus relationships now currently used in genetic engineering.

From the organic gardener's point of view, the important roles that bacteria play are:

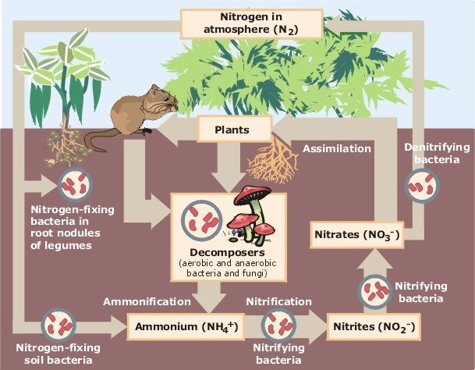
The nitrogen cycle

=== Nitrification ===
Nitrification is a vital part of the nitrogen cycle, wherein certain chemolithotrophic nitrifying bacteria (e.g. Nitrosomonas), called autotrophic nitrifiers (manufacturing their own carbohydrate supply without using the process of photosynthesis) are able to transform nitrogen in the form of ammonium, which is produced by the decomposition of proteins, into nitrates, available to growing plants and once again converted to proteins. Other nitrifying bacteria (e.g. Arthrobacter) are able of heterotrophic nitrification, a still badly known biochemical process of soil nitrogen transformation.

=== Nitrogen fixation ===
In another part of the nitrogen cycle, the process of nitrogen fixation constantly puts additional nitrogen into biological circulation. This is carried out by free-living nitrogen-fixing (diazotroph) bacteria in the soil or water such as Azotobacter and heterocyst-bearing cyanobacteria (blue-green algae), or by those that live in close symbiosis with legumes, such as rhizobia, or with actinorhizal plants, such as Frankia. These form colonies in nodules they create on the roots of peas, beans, Casuarina and related flowering plants. Nitrogen-fixing bacteria are able to convert nitrogen from the atmosphere into nitrogen-containing organic substances, and thus play a decisive role in incipient soil formation.

=== Denitrification ===
While nitrogen fixation converts nitrogen from the atmosphere into organic compounds, a series of processes called denitrification returns some amount of nitrogen to the atmosphere. Denitrifying bacteria tend to be anaerobes, or facultatively anaerobes (can altern between the oxygen dependent and oxygen independent types of metabolisms), including Achromobacter and Pseudomonas. The denitrification process caused by oxygen-free conditions converts nitrates and nitrites in soil into nitrogen gas or into gaseous compounds such as nitrous oxide or nitric oxide. In excess, denitrification can lead to overall losses of available soil nitrogen and subsequent loss of soil fertility. An excess of nitrogen fertilizers may cause denitrification in addition to nitrate loss by percolation to the aquifer. However, fixed nitrogen may circulate many times between organisms and the soil before denitrification returns it to the atmosphere, as shown by the diagram above illustrating the nitrogen cycle.

=== Actinomycetota ===
Actinomycetota (actinomycetes, actinobacteria) are critical in the decomposition of organic matter and in humus formation. They specialize in breaking down cellulose and lignin along with the tough chitin found in the exoskeletons of arthropods. Their various production of volatile metabolites is responsible for the sweet earthy aroma associated with a good healthy soil. They require plenty of air and a pH between 6.0 and 7.5, but are more tolerant of dry conditions than most other bacteria and fungi.

== Fungi ==
A gram of garden soil can contain around one million fungi, such as yeasts and moulds, and around 700 km fungal hyphae can live in 1 g of soil. Fungi have no chlorophyll, and are not able to photosynthesise. They cannot use atmospheric carbon dioxide as a source of carbon, therefore they are chemo-heterotrophic, meaning that, like animals, they require a chemical source of energy rather than being able to use light as an energy source, as well as organic substrates to get carbon for growth and development. Given these requirements and the development of a dense hyphal network (mycelium) they actively participate to the degradation of freshly deposited organic remains and their transformation in humus (humification) and carbon dioxide (mineralization).

Many fungi are parasitic, often causing disease to their living host plant, although some have beneficial relationships with living plants, as illustrated below. In terms of soil and humus creation, the most important fungi tend to be saprotrophic; that is, they live on dead or decaying organic matter, thus breaking it down and converting it to mineral forms (e.g. nitrate, ammonium, phosphate) that are available to the higher plants. A succession of fungal species will colonise the dead matter, beginning with those that use sugars and starches, which are succeeded by those that are able to break down cellulose and lignins.

Fungi spread underground by sending long thin threads known as mycelium throughout the soil; these threads can be observed throughout many soils and compost heaps. From the mycelium the fungus is able to throw up its fruiting bodies, the visible part above the soil (e.g., mushrooms, toadstools, and puffballs), which may contain millions of spores. When the fruiting body bursts, these spores are dispersed through the air to settle in fresh environments, and are able to lie dormant for up to years until the right conditions for their activation arise or the right food is made available. Fungal spores are dispersed by wind, water, but also by a variety of fungal-feeding animals, from small invertebrates (e.g. springtails) to big mammals (e.g. wild boars), helping them to colonize new, sometimes remote environments, hence the cosmopolitan distribution of many fungal species.

=== Mycorrhizae ===
Those fungi that are able to live symbiotically with living plants, creating a relationship that is beneficial to both, are known as mycorrhizae (from myco meaning fungus and rhiza meaning root). In mycorrhizae plant roots are invaded by the mycelium of the mycorrhizal fungus, which lives partly in the soil and partly in the root, and may either penetrate the root cortex without entering its cells (forming the Hartig net) and cover the root as a sheath (ectomycorrhizae) or be present in cortical cells in the form of arbuscules (arbuscular mycorrhizae). The mycorrhizal fungus obtains the carbohydrates that it requires from the root, in return providing the plant with nutrients, including nitrogen and phosphorus, and with moisture. Later the plant roots will also absorb the mycelium into its own tissues. In some cases mycorrhizae could provide their host, either directly or indirectly, with nutrients issued from the degradation of more complex soil organic matter (humus). Mycorrhizae can also benefit nutrients (other than sugar carbon) and moisture from the host, and exchange nutrients (including carbon) and moisture between plants through common mycorrhizal networks. Chemical signalling between plants through common mycorrhizal networks, although a beautiful concept, is still a matter of conjecture, more research being needed.

Beneficial mycorrhizal associations (either ectomycorrhizae or arbuscular mycorrhizae) are to be found in many of our edible and flowering crops, to the exception of Brassicaceae (e.g. cabbage, turnip) as well as in the majority of tree species, especially in forests and woodlands, with Ericaceae (e.g. bracken, bilberry) harbouring a special type, called ericoid mycorrhizae. Tree mycorrhizae create a fine underground mesh that extends greatly beyond the limits of the tree's roots, greatly increasing their feeding range and actually causing neighbouring trees to become physically interconnected. The benefits of mycorrhizal relations to their plant partners are not limited to nutrients, but can be essential for plant reproduction. In situations where little light is able to reach the forest floor, a young seedling cannot obtain sufficient light to photosynthesise for itself and will not grow properly, causing a deficit of regeneration. But, if the ground is underlain by a mycorrhizal mat, then the developing seedling will throw down roots that can link with the fungal threads and through them obtain the nutrients it needs.

In "The Private Life of Plants", a BBC documentary series, David Attenborough points out the plant, fungal, animal relationship that creates a "three way harmonious trio" to be found in forest ecosystems, wherein the plant/fungus symbiosis is enhanced by animals such as wild boars, deer, mice, or squirrels, which feed upon fungal fruiting bodies (mushrooms), including truffles, and cause their further spread. A greater understanding of the complex relationships that pervade natural systems is one of the major justifications of the organic gardener, in refraining from the use of artificial chemicals and the damage these might cause.

Recent research has shown that arbuscular mycorrhizal fungi produce glomalin, a protein that binds soil particles and stores both carbon and nitrogen. These glomalin-related soil proteins are an important part of soil organic matter.

== Invertebrates ==
Soil fauna affect soil formation and soil organic matter dynamically on many spatiotemporal scales. Earthworms, ants and termites, known as ecosystem engineers, mix the soil as they burrow, significantly affecting soil formation and organic matter dynamics. Earthworms ingest soil particles and organic residues, enhancing the availability of plant nutrients in the material that passes through and out of their bodies. By aerating and stirring the soil, and by increasing the stability of soil aggregates, these organisms help to assure the ready infiltration of water. These organisms in the soil also help improve pH levels, by buffering them around neutrality, an equilibrating process (negative feedback loop) by which fungal activity is favoured in alkaline soils while bacterial activity is favoured in acid soils.

Ants and termites are also often referred to as soil engineers because, when they create their nests, there are several chemical and physical changes made to the soil. Among these changes are increasing presence of the most essential elements like carbon, nitrogen, and phosphorus, elements needed for plant growth. They also can gather soil particles from differing depths of soil and deposit them in other places, leading to the mixing of soil so it is richer with nutrients and other elements.

== Vertebrates ==
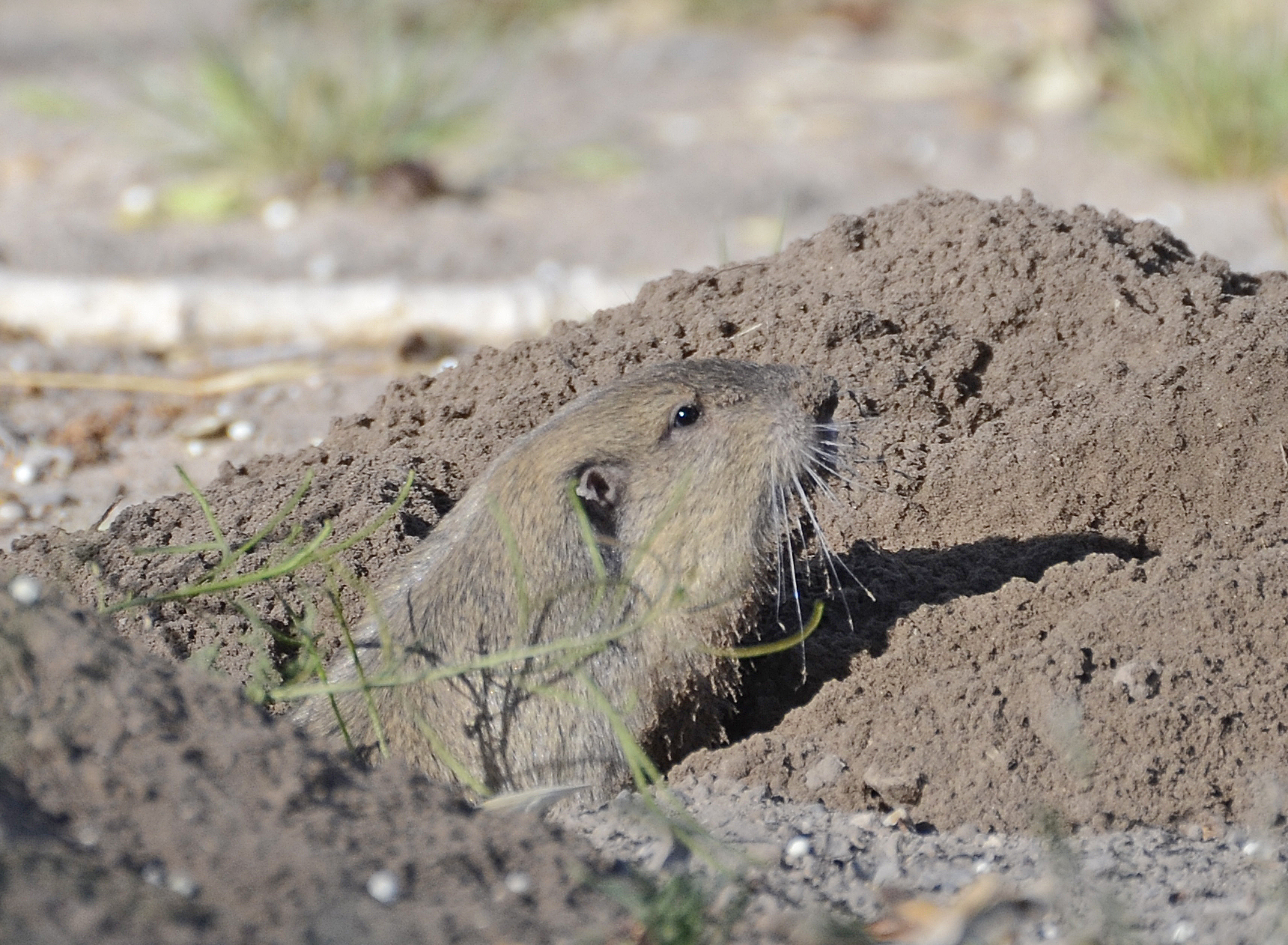
Gopher sticking out of burrow

The soil is also important to many mammals. Gophers, moles, prairie dogs, and other burrowing animals rely on this soil for protection and food. The animals even give back to the soil as their burrowing creates nutrient-rich patches and allows more water to infiltrate the soil by increasing porosity, thus decreasing runoff along slopes.

== Table of soil life ==
This table includes some familiar types of soil life, coherent with prevalent taxonomy as used in the linked Wikipedia articles.

Domain	Kingdom	Phylum	Class	Order	Family	Genus
Prokaryote	Bacteria	Pseudomonadota	Betaproteobacteria	Nitrosomonadales	Nitrosomonadaceae	Nitrosomonas
Prokaryote	Bacteria	Pseudomonadota	Alphaproteobacteria	Hyphomicrobiales	Nitrobacteraceae	Nitrobacter
Prokaryote	Bacteria	Pseudomonadota	Alphaproteobacteria	Hyphomicrobiales	Rhizobiaceae	Rhizobium (Note: See Rhizobia for a list of other nitrogen-fixing bacteria occupying the similar niche of root nodules.)
Prokaryote	Bacteria	Pseudomonadota	Gammaproteobacteria	Pseudomonadales	Azotobacteraceae	Azotobacter
Prokaryote	Bacteria	Actinomycetota	Actinomycetia			
Prokaryote	Bacteria	"Cyanobacteria (Blue-green algae)				
Prokaryote	Bacteria	Bacillota	Clostridia	Clostridiales	Clostridiaceae	Clostridium
Eukaryote	Fungi	Ascomycota	Eurotiomycetes	Eurotiales	Trichocomaceae	Penicillium
Eukaryote	Fungi	Ascomycota	Eurotiomycetes	Eurotiales	Trichocomaceae	Aspergillus
Eukaryote	Fungi	Ascomycota	Sordariomycetes	Hypocreales	Nectriaceae	Fusarium
Eukaryote	Fungi	Ascomycota	Sordariomycetes	Hypocreales	Hypocreaceae	Trichoderma
Eukaryote	Fungi	Basidiomycota	Agaricomycetes	Cantharellales	Ceratobasidiaceae	Rhizoctonia
Eukaryote	Fungi	Zygomycota	Zygomycetes	Mucorales	Mucoraceae	Mucor
Eukaryote	SAR (clade)	Heterokontophyta	Bacillariophyceae (Diatomea algae)			
Eukaryote	SAR (clade)	Heterokontophyta	Xanthophyceae (Yellow-green algae)			
Eukaryote	Alveolata (clade)	Ciliophora				
Eukaryote	Amoebozoa (clade)					
Eukaryote	Plantae	Chlorophyta (green algae)	Chlorophyceae			
Eukaryote	Animalia	Nematoda				
Eukaryote	Animalia	Rotifer				
Eukaryote	Animalia	Tardigrada				
Eukaryote	Animalia	Arthropoda	Entognatha	Collembola		
Eukaryote	Animalia	Arthropoda	Entognatha	Diplura		
Eukaryote	Animalia	Arthropoda	Entognatha	Protura		
Eukaryote	Animalia	Arthropoda	Arachnida	Acarina		
Eukaryote	Animalia	Arthropoda	Arachnida	Pseudoscorpionida		
Eukaryote	Animalia	Arthropoda	Insecta	Coleoptera (larvae)		
Eukaryote	Animalia	Arthropoda	Insecta	Coleoptera	Carabidae (Ground beetles)	
Eukaryote	Animalia	Arthropoda	Insecta	Coleoptera	Staphylinidae (Rove beetle)	
Eukaryote	Animalia	Arthropoda	Insecta	Diptera (larvae)		
Eukaryote	Animalia	Arthropoda	Insecta	Hymenoptera	Formicidae (Ant)	
Eukaryote	Animalia	Arthropoda	Chilopoda (Centipede)			
Eukaryote	Animalia	Arthropoda	Diplopoda (Millipede)			
Eukaryote	Animalia	Arthropoda	Symphyla			
Eukaryote	Animalia	Arthropoda	Pauropoda			
Eukaryote	Animalia	Arthropoda	Malacostraca	Isopoda (woodlouse)		
Eukaryote	Animalia	Annelida	Clitellata	Haplotaxida	Enchytraeidae	
Eukaryote	Animalia	Annelida	Clitellata	Haplotaxida	Lumbricidae	
Eukaryote	Animalia	Mollusca	Gastropoda			

== See also ==
- Agricultural soil science
- Agroecology
- Biogeochemical cycle
- Compost
- Nitrification
- Nitrogen cycle
- Potting soil
- Soil food web
- Soil microbiology
- Soil science

== Bibliography ==
- Alexander, 1977, Introduction to Soil Microbiology, 2nd edition, John Wiley
- Alexander, 1994, Biodegradation and Bioremediation, Academic Press
- Bardgett, R.D., 2005, The Biology of Soil: A Community and Ecosystem Approach, Oxford University Press
- Burges, A., and Raw, F., 1967, Soil Biology: Academic Press
- Coleman D.C. et al., 2004, Fundamentals of Soil Ecology, 2nd edition, Academic Press
- Coyne, 1999, Soil Microbiology: An Exploratory Approach, Delmar
- Doran, J.W., D.C. Coleman, D.F. Bezdicek and B.A. Stewart. 1994. Defining soil quality for a sustainable environment. Soil Science Society of America Special Publication Number 35, ASA, Madison Wis.
- Paul, P.A. and F.E. Clark. 1996, Soil Microbiology and Biochemistry, 2nd edition, Academic Press
- Richards, 1987, The Microbiology of Terrestrial Ecosystems, Longman Scientific & Technical
- Sylvia et al., 1998, Principles and Applications of Soil Microbiology, Prentice Hall
- Soil and Water Conservation Society, 2000, Soil Biology Primer.
- Tate, 2000, Soil Microbiology, 2nd edition, John Wiley
- van Elsas et al., 1997, Modern Soil Microbiology, Marcel Dekker
- Wood, 1995, Environmental Soil Biology, 2nd edition, Blackie A & P
- Vats, Rajeev & Sanjeev, Aggarwal. (2019). Impact of termite activity and its effect on soil composition.
