= Mycorrhizal fungi and soil carbon storage =

Terrestrial ecosystem

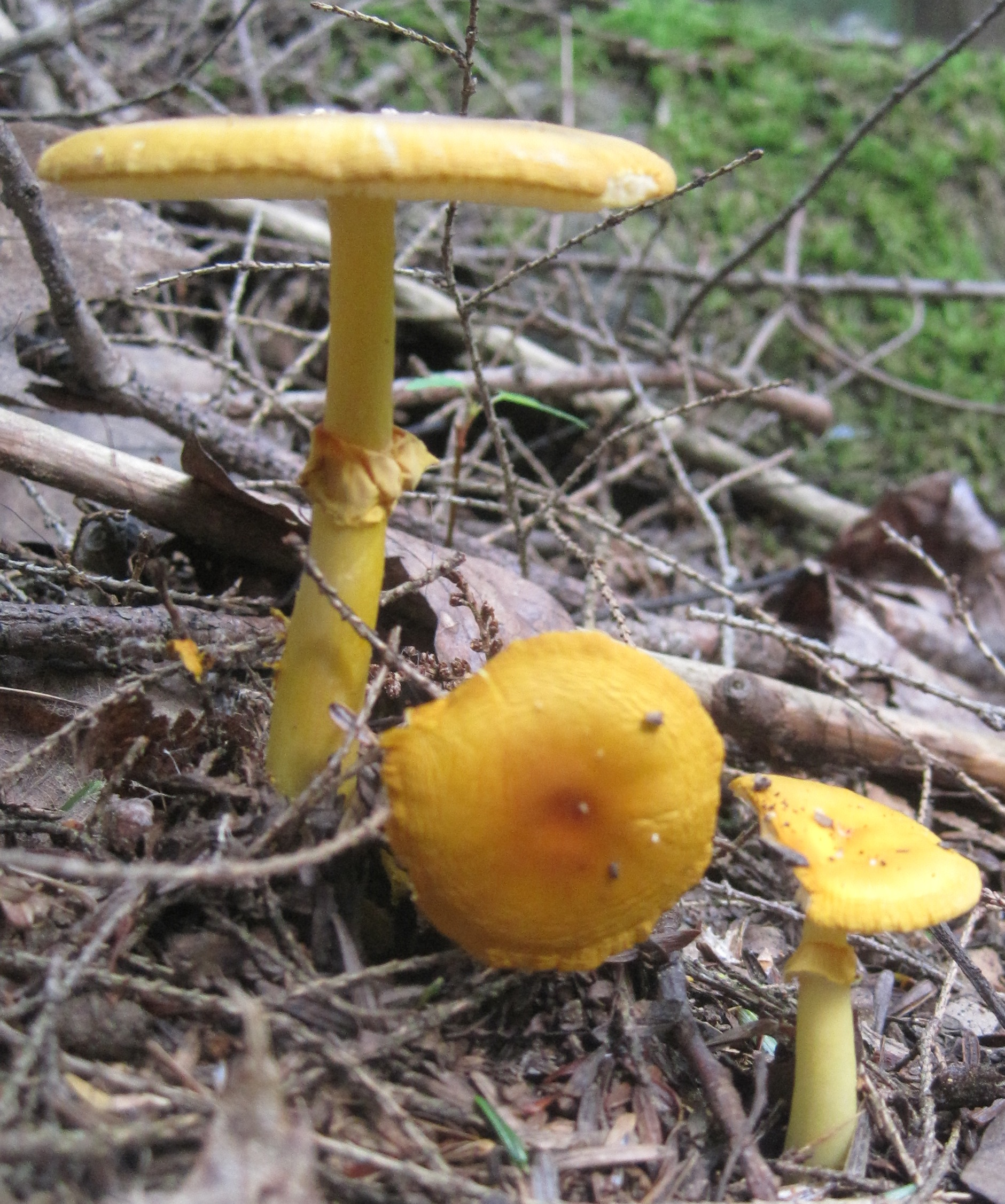
Ectomycorrhizal fruiting body, Amanita spp.

Soil carbon storage is an important function of terrestrial ecosystems. Soil contains more carbon than plants and the atmosphere combined. Understanding what maintains the soil carbon pool is important to understand the current distribution of carbon on Earth, and how it will respond to environmental change. While much research has been done on how plants, free-living microbial decomposers, and soil minerals affect this pool of carbon, it is recently coming to light that mycorrhizal fungi—symbiotic fungi that associate with roots of almost all living plants—may play an important role in maintaining this pool as well. Measurements of plant carbon allocation to mycorrhizal fungi have been estimated to be 5 to 20% of total plant carbon uptake, and in some ecosystems the biomass of mycorrhizal fungi can be comparable to the biomass of fine roots. Recent research has shown that mycorrhizal fungi hold 50 to 70 percent of the total carbon stored in leaf litter and soil on forested islands in Sweden. Turnover of mycorrhizal biomass into the soil carbon pool is thought to be rapid and has been shown in some ecosystems to be the dominant pathway by which living carbon enters the soil carbon pool.

Outlined below are the leading lines of evidence for how different aspects of mycorrhizal fungi may alter soil carbon decomposition and storage. Evidence is presented for arbuscular and ectomycorrhizal fungi separately as they are phylogenetically distinct and often function in very different ways.

== Recalcitrance of mycorrhizal tissues ==
Based on the magnitude of mycorrhizal fungal inputs to the soil carbon pool, some have suggested that variation in the recalcitrance of mycorrhizal biomass may be important for predicting soil carbon storage, as it would affect the rate at which the contribution of mycorrhizal fungi to soil carbon is returned to the atmosphere. The compound glomalin, produced only by arbuscular mycorrhizal fungi, has been found to accumulate in some soils, and may be a substantial fraction of the soil carbon pool in these ecosystems. However, a recent set of experiments demonstrates the presence of arbuscular mycorrhizal fungi results in net losses of soil carbon, calling into question the role of glomalin produced by arbuscular mycorrhizal fungi leading to increased soil carbon storage. Proteomic work has revealed that most of the proteins isolated in the glomalin extraction are not of mycorrhizal origin, and therefore the contribution of this molecule to soil C storage has likely been overestimated.

Using a similar line of argument, Langley and Hungate (2003) argued that the abundance of chitin in ectomycorrhizal tissues may reduce decomposition rates of these fungi, under the assumption that chitin is recalcitrant. This possibility was tested and refuted recently. Fernandez and Koide (2012) show that chitin does not decompose more slowly than other chemical compounds in ectomycorrhizal tissues, and that chitin concentrations positively correlated with mycorrhizal biomass decomposition rates, rather than negatively.

== Effects on fine root decomposition ==
Mycorrhizal fungi are nutrient rich structures compared to the roots they colonize, and it is possible that mycorrhizal colonization of roots leads to increased rates of root decomposition because decomposers would have greater access to nutrients. Evidence is equivocal on this point, as ectomycorrhizal colonization does increase fine root decomposition rates substantially compared to uncolonized roots in some ecosystems, while Pinus edulis roots colonized predominately by ectomycorrhizal fungi from the Ascomycota group have been found to decompose more slowly than uncolonized controls.

In an experiment where the effect of arbuscular mycorrhizal colonization on plant decomposition was tested, only aboveground plant material was found to have decomposed faster after 3 months while root decomposition remained unchanged, even though arbuscular mycorrhizal fungi are confined to roots.

== Effects on soil aggregation ==
Soil aggregation can physically protect organic carbon from decay by soil microbes. More aggregate formation can result in more soil carbon storage. There is much evidence that arbuscular mycorrhizal fungi increase soil aggregate formation, and that aggregate formation may be mediated by the arbuscular mycorrhizal protein glomalin. Therefore, even if glomalin itself is not exceptionally recalcitrant and chemically resistant to decomposition (as described above) it may still contribute to soil carbon storage by physically protecting other organic matter from decomposition by promoting soil aggregation. There is little information regarding the role of ectomycorrhizal fungi in soil aggregate stability. There are anecdotal accounts of ectomycorrhizal fungi increasing aggregation in sand in-growth bags commonly used to trap these fungi, but no current evidence that they promote aggregate formation or stability in field soils.

== Stimulation of decomposition (priming) ==
Arbuscular mycorrhizal fungi have been shown to increase soil carbon decomposition in nutrient rich patches. Since arbuscular mycorrhizal fungi are thought to lack the ability to produce the enzymes to catalyze this decomposition it is generally thought that they stimulate free-living decomposer communities to increase activity by exuding labile energy substrates, a process termed priming. Recent lab experiments have shown that the presence of arbuscular mycorrhizal fungi increases losses of soil carbon compared to soils where arbuscular mycorrhizal fungi are excluded, and that the difference is greater under elevated CO_{2} when the abundance of arbuscular mycorrhizal fungi is greater. The evidence for ectomycorrhizal priming is so far inconclusive. Field evidence suggests that ectomycorrhizal fungi may be increasing the rate of soil carbon degradation, however lab tests show that exudation from fine roots decreases with increasing ectomycorrhizal colonization, which suggests that abundance of ectomycorrhizal fungi should reduce priming effects. Brzostek et al. (2012) report variation in form of nitrogen produced in the rhizosphere of trees that vary in mycorrhizal type, however the effects of root and mycorrhizal priming could not be separated.

== Inhibition of decomposition ==
The first report of mycorrhizal inhibition of decomposition was in 1971 and came from ectomycorrhizal Pinus radiata plantations in New Zealand. Authors show that excluding roots and mycorrhizal fungi resulted in net carbon loss, and that the result could not be explained by soil disturbance effects. The mechanism presented is that ectomycorrhizal fungi can compete with free-living decomposers for nutrients, and thereby limit the rate of total decomposition. Since then there have been several other reports of ectomycorrhizal fungi reducing activity and decomposition rates of free-living decomposers and thereby increasing soil carbon storage. A theoretical ecosystem model recently demonstrated that greater access to organic nitrogen by mycorrhizal fungi should slow decomposition of soil carbon by free-living decomposers by inducing nutrient limitation. Koide and Wu (2003) made a strong case that the effect of ectomycorrhizal fungi on reducing decomposition may have more to do with competition for soil water than soil nutrients.

It is possible that arbuscular mycorrhizal fungi may be outcompeting free-living decomposers for either water or nutrients in some systems as well; however, to date there is no demonstration of this, and it seems that arbuscular mycorrhizal fungi may more often increase, rather than decrease rates of decomposition by free-living microbial decomposers.

== See also ==
- Arbuscular mycorrhiza
- Decomposition
- Glomalin
- Mycorrhiza
- Soil
- Soil carbon
