= Glomalin =

Glycoprotein produced by fungi

Glomalin is a hypothetical glycoprotein produced abundantly on hyphae and spores of arbuscular mycorrhizal (AM) fungi in soil and in roots. Glomalin was proposed in 1996 by Sara F. Wright, a scientist at the USDA Agricultural Research Service, but it was not isolated and described yet. The name comes from Glomerales, an order of fungi. Most AM fungi are of the division Glomeromycota. An elusive substance, it is mostly assumed to have a glue-like effect on soil, but it has not been isolated yet.

== Definition and controversy ==
The specific protein glomalin has not yet been isolated and described. What has been described is an extraction process involving heat and citrate, producing a mixture containing a substance that is reactive to a monoclonal antibody Mab32B11 raised against crushed AM fungi spores. The substance is then provisionally named "glomalin". As many laboratories do not have the equipment to perform an antibody-based isolation (ELISA), a crude mixture called glomalin-related soil proteins (GRSP) is used to refer to the extract portion reactive to the Bradford protein assay. There is significant confusion between the ideal glomalin protein, the antibody-reactive extract portion termed "glomalin", and GRSP.

"Glomalin" was first detected by the Mab32B11 ELISA assay in 1987. According to the scientist that proposed the hypothetical protein, Sarah F. Wright, it eluded extraction until 1996 because "It requires an unusual effort to dislodge glomalin for study: a bath in citrate combined with heating at 250 °F (121 °C) for at least an hour.... No other soil glue found to date required anything as drastic as this." However, using advanced analytical methods in 2010, the citrate-heating extraction procedure for GRSP was proven to co-extract humic substances, so it is still not clear if this "glue effect" comes from glomalin or the other substances that are co-extracted using that method.

== Description ==
Based on her extraction, Wright thinks the "glomalin molecule is a clump of small glycoproteins with iron and other ions attached... glomalin contains from 1 to 9% tightly bound iron.... We've seen glomalin on the outside of hyphae, and we believe this is how the hyphae seal themselves so they can carry water and nutrients. It may also be what gives them the rigidity they need to span the air spaces between soil particles."

There is other circumstantial evidence to show that glomalin is of AM fungal origin. When AM fungi are eliminated from soil through incubation of soil without host plants, the concentration of GRSP declines. A similar decline in GRSP has also been observed in incubated soils from forested, afforested, and agricultural land and grasslands treated with fungicide.

Glomalin is not synonym of GRSP. Glomalin is the protein that binds to the Mab32B11 antibody, while GRSP is a crude extract containing many substances, including humic acids.

The chemistry of GRSP is not yet fully understood, and the link between glomalin, GRSP, and AM fungi is not yet clear. The physiological function of glomalin in fungi is also a topic of current research.

== Effects ==
Glomalin is hypothesized to improve soil aggregate stability and decrease soil erosion. However, since glomalin can not be adequate quantified in soil, studies usually analyze the GRSPs extract, which is a complex mixture including proteins and other substances.

GRSPs, the mixture of proteins and humic substances, are a significant component of soil organic matter and act to bind mineral particles together, improving soil quality. GRSPs have been investigated for its carbon and nitrogen storing properties, including as a potential method of carbon sequestration. Sampled GRSP takes 7–42 years to biodegrade and is thought to contribute up to 30 percent of the soil carbon where mycorrhizal fungi is present. The highest levels of GRSP were found in volcanic soils of Hawaii and Japan. Concentrations of glomalin in soil were correlated with the primary productivity of an ecosystem. A strong correlation has been found between GRSP and soil aggregate water stability in a wide variety of soils where organic material is the main binding agent, although the mechanism is not known.

== See also ==
- Carbon cycle
- Humus
- Mycorrhizal fungi and soil carbon storage
- Soil life
- Soil structure
