= Robert Aller =

Robert Aller is an American marine biogeochemist and distinguished professor in the School of Marine and atmospheric sciences at Stony Brook University, where he is also affiliated with the Department of Geosciences. His research focuses on marine biogeochemistry, early diagenesis, and the interactions between benthic organisms and marine sediments, particularly the role of bioturbation, and function of deltaic systems in sediment geochemistry and global elemental cycling. He is a Fellow of the American Geophysical Union, the Geochemical Society, and the European Association of Geochemistry, and has received the American Chemical Society Geochemistry Division Medal.

== Education ==
Aller earned bachelor's degrees in biology–geology (BS) and chemistry (BA) from the University of Rochester in 1972, graduating with highest distinction. He completed an M.Phil. in 1974 and Ph.D. in 1977 in geology and geophysics at Yale University, where his doctoral research examined the influence of benthic organisms on the chemical diagenesis of marine sediments. His doctoral research was supervised by geochemist Karl K. Turekian and marine geologist Donald C. Rhoads.

== Career ==
Following completion of his doctorate, Aller joined the University of Chicago in 1977 as assistant professor of geophysical sciences. He was promoted to associate professor with tenure in 1980 and became professor in 1985. In 1986 he joined the State University of New York at Stony Brook as professor in the Marine Sciences Research Center, and since 1998 has served as Distinguished Professor in the School of Marine and Atmospheric Sciences, with an affiliate appointment in the Department of Geosciences.

Aller has served as associate editor of Geochimica et Cosmochimica Acta, the Journal of Marine Research, and on the editorial boards of Continental Shelf Research, Geobiology, and Ichnos. He has chaired the Gordon Research Conference on Chemical Oceanography and has participated on scientific advisory committees, and national and international research review panels.

== Research ==
Aller's research focuses on marine biogeochemistry, early diagenesis, and marine animal–sediment interactions, with particular emphasis on the processes that regulate elemental cycling in marine sediments. His work examines diagenetic processes, mineral authigenesis, the decomposition of organic matter, and the exchange of dissolved materials across the sediment–water interface in coastal and deep-sea environments. His field studies have included Long Island Sound, the Changjiang delta– East China Sea, the Amazon–Guianas mobile mudbelt along French Guiana, Papua New Guinea, and Arctic fjords.

He is known for advancing the understanding of bioturbation and bioirrigation the processes by which benthic organisms modify sediment structure and chemistry. His research demonstrated how these biological activities regulate the transport of oxygen and dissolved substances, creating dynamic redox and acid - base conditions that influence the cycling of carbon, sulfur, iron, manganese, nitrogen, and other elements in marine sediments. He helped develop applications of thorium / uranium series nuclides to quantify sedimentary dynamics, and identified seasonal patterns of calcium carbonate dissolution in coastal marine environments. He has also contributed to the development and application of two-dimensional optical sensors, including high-resolution pH, Fe^{2+}, H_{2}S and pCO₂ sensors, for examining biogeochemical heterogeneity, solute transport, and porewater dynamics within bioturbated sediments.

Another major area of his research has been the study of reverse weathering, authigenic mineral formation, and geochemical processes in physically dynamic tropical deltaic systems. His work has examined the formation of iron-rich clay minerals and iron carbonates in mobile mud belts and their role in elemental cycling, organic matter remineralization, long-term carbon storage, and global marine geochemical cycles. His research combines field investigations, laboratory experiments, geochemical analyses, and quantitative modeling to examine the interactions between biological activity, sediment transport, and marine geochemistry.

== Awards and honors ==
- Doctor Honoris Causa, University of Gothenburg (2002)
- Doctor Honoris Causa, Universite de la Mediterranee Aix-Marseille II (Aix-Marseille University) (2005)
- American Chemical Society Geochemistry Division Medal (2007)
- Fellow, American Geophysical Union (2003)
- Fellow, Geochemical Society (2003)
- Fellow, European Association of Geochemistry (2003)
- Ingerson Lecturer, Geochemical Society (2006)
- Distinguished Alumni Award, University of Rochester (2023)
