= Black Banks =

Black Banks may refer to:

- Black Banks, Prince Edward Island, a community
- Black Banks Creek, a stream in South Dakota
- Black-owned Banks, a type of minority depository institution
- Bank Black Movement, a grassroots movement to support the growth of Black-owned banks in the United States
