= Martin Lockley =

Welsh palaeontologist (1950–2023)

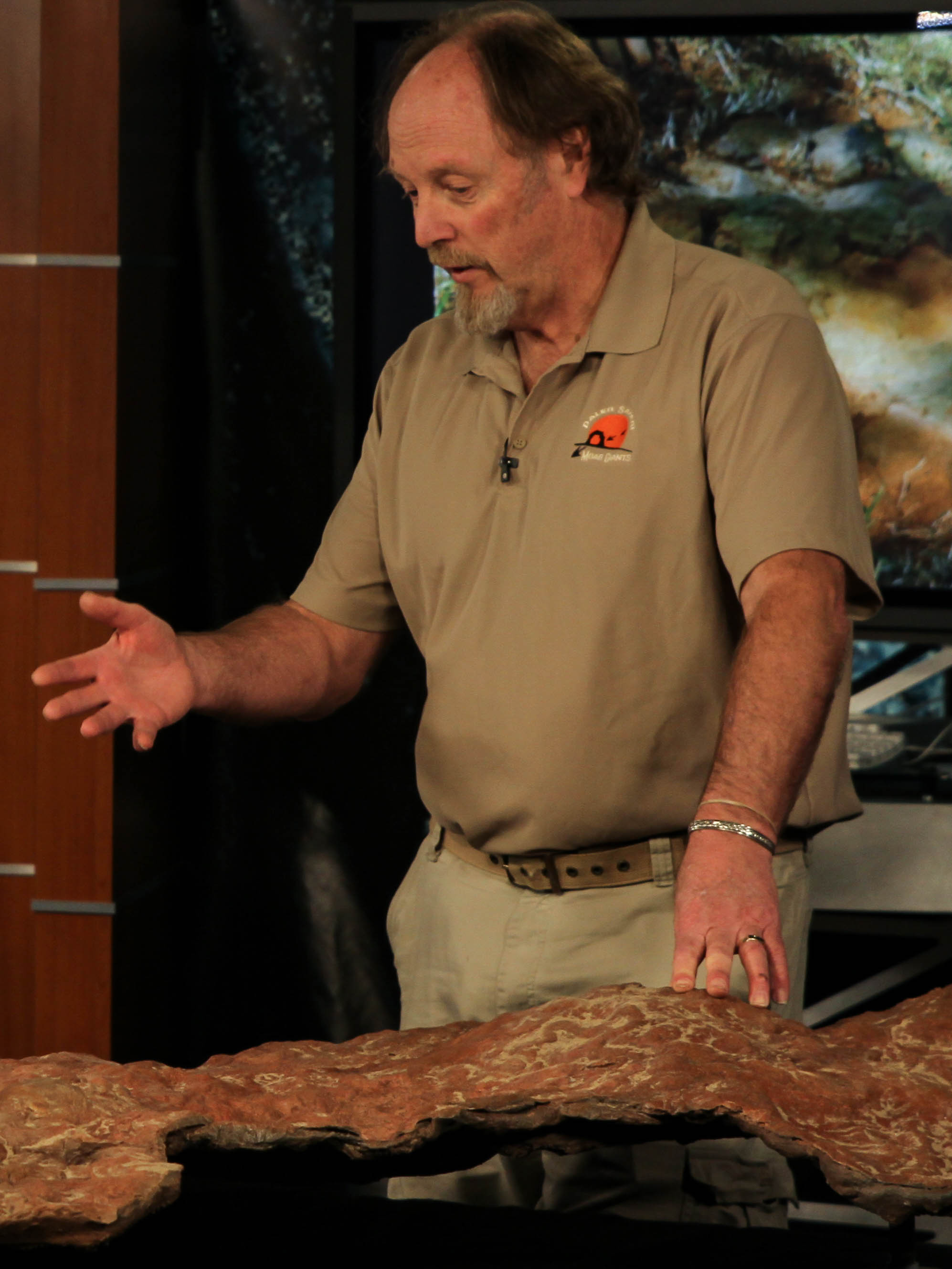
Lockley with fossil tracks in 2016

Martin G. Lockley (17 March 1950 – 25 November 2023) was a Welsh palaeontologist. He was educated in the United Kingdom where he obtained degrees (BSc and PhD) and post-doctoral experience in Geology in the 1970s. Since 1980 he has been a professor at the University of Colorado at Denver, (UCD) and was later professor emeritus. He is best known for his work on fossil footprints and was the former director of the Dinosaur Tracks Museum at UCD. He was an Associate Curator at the University of Colorado Museum of Natural History and a Research Associate at the Denver Museum of Nature and Science. During his years at UCD he earned a BA in 2007 in Spanish with a minor in Religious Studies, became a member of the Scientific and Medical Network and taught and published on the evolution of consciousness.

== Early life ==
NASA video featuring Lockley 9 minutes in

Martin G. Lockley was born in the Channel Islands on 17 March 1950, and grew up in Orielton, a large country house in South Wales, now the Orielton Field Studies Centre. His interest in natural history grew under the influence of his father, Ronald M. Lockley (1903–2000) who became well known as an ornithologist and author of more than 50 books.

Lockley moved to England in the early 1960s where he attended Leighton Park School and twice (1966, 1968) won the All England Schools championship in shot put. Later, after earning a BSc in geology from the Queen's University Belfast, he embarked on a career in palaeontology under the guidance of his mentor Sir Alwyn Williams FRS, obtaining a PhD from the University of Birmingham (1977). As a graduate student and post-doctoral researcher at Glasgow University (1977–1980), he studied Welsh Ordovician paleoecology and represented Wales in athletics.

In 1980 Lockley took a position as assistant professor of geology at the University of Colorado Denver, and began his field-oriented research on fossil footprints. Before then, few people had studied fossil footprints in the Rocky Mountain region, despite what turned out to be an abundance of important sites, including the Purgatoire Dinosaur Tracksite site in southeastern Colorado. As the fossil footprint collections grew, Lockley created the Dinosaur Tracks Museum, acting as Curator/Director there from 1996 until 2012. During this time he became a founding member of the Museum of Western Colorado with Dinosaur Ridge near Denver. He built up the fossil footprint collection to include more than 2,700 specimens particularly representing Colorado and Utah.

== Career ==
Lockley in 2014 researched fossil trackways in Colorado and western North America, China, South Korea, Spain and the UK. He has published results of fossil footprint research in Portugal, Germany, France, Bolivia, Japan, Thailand and East Africa. He has been involved in efforts to create Geoparks, UNESCO World Heritage sites and other protected areas in North America, Europe and East Asia.

== Death ==
Lockley died after a battle with cancer on 25 November 2023, at the age of 73.

== Awards and recognition ==
Awards and recognition include the American Association of Petroleum Geologists Distinguished Lecturer (1991–1992) and Harrison Schmitt Award (2013), Rocky Mountain Association of Geologists Distinguished Public Service and Journalism Awards, and The University of Colorado Chancellor's Lecturer Award, Researcher of the Year and Colorado Community Service Awards.

In 2018, the dinosaur ichnogenus Lockleypus ("Lockley's foot") was named in honour of Lockley for his contributions to dinosaur paleoichnology.

== Books ==
- 1991 Lockley, M.G. Tracking Dinosaurs: a new look at an ancient world. Cambridge Univ. Press, 238 pp.
- 1994 Lockley, M.G., Santos, V.F., Meyer, C.A. and Hunt, A.P. Aspects of Sauropod Biology. Gaia: Revista de Geosciencias, Museu Nacional de Historia Natural, Lisbon, Portugal, 266 pp.
- 1995 Lockley, M.G. with Hunt, A.P. Dinosaur Tracks and other fossil footprints of the western United States, Columbia University Press, 338 pp.
- 1999 Lockley, M. G. 1999. The Eternal Trail: a tracker looks at evolution. Perseus Books, 334 pp.
- 2000 Lockley, M. G. and Meyer, C. A. 1999. Dinosaur Tracks and other fossil footprints of Europe. Columbia University Press. 323 pp.
- 2002 Lockley, M. G. and Peterson, J. A guide to fossil footprints of the World. A Lockley-Peterson Publication. 124 pp.
- 2003–2004 Pemberton, S. G., McCrea, R. T. and Lockley, M. G. William A. S. Sarjeant : A celebration of his life and ichnological contributions. Ichnos, v. 10: (2–4) & v. 11 (1–4) 221 + 384 pp.
- 2006 Harris, J. D., Lucas, S.G. Speilmann, J., Lockley, M. G., Milner, A.R.C. and Kirkland, J. I. The Triassic Jurassic Terrestrial Transition. New Mexico Museum of Natural History and Science Bulletin 37. 607pp.
- 2006 Lockley, M. G., Tracker’s Journey. (illustrated by Paul Koroshetz), XLibris 60p (self-published).
- 2007 Lucas, S.G., Speilmann, J. and Lockley, M. G. Cenozoic Vertebrates Tracks and Traces. New Mexico Museum of Natural History and Science Bulletin 42. 244 pp.
- 2008 Lockley, M. G., Jill's Journey: the life and times of a remarkable Jersey girl. Dinosaur Designs 107 pp.
- 2008–2009 Kim, J-Y and Lockley, M. G., Hominid Ichnology: tracking our origins. Ichnos, v. 15: (3–4) & v. 16 (1–2) 165 + 175 pp.
- 2010 Lockley, M. G., and Morimoto, R. How Humanity came into being: the evolution of consciousness. Floris Books, 358 pp.
- 2010 Milan, J., Lucas, S.G., Lockley, M. G. and Speilmann, J. Crocodyle tracks and Traces. New Mexico Museum of Natural History and Science Bulletin] 51. 244 pp.
- 2011 Lockley, M. G., Colorado's Dinosaur Artist. Friends of Dinosaur Ridge and Dinosaur Designs 60 pp.
- 2014 Lockley, M. G. and Lucas, S.G. Fossil Footprints of Western North America. New Mexico Museum of Natural History and Science Bulletin 62.
- 2014 Lockley, M. G. and Marshall, C. A Field Guide to the Dinosaur Ridge. (4th edition). Friends of Dinosaur Ridge.
