= Gilgai =

Small, ephemeral lake in expanding clay soils

A gilgai is a small, ephemeral lake formed from a surface depression in expanding clay soils. Gilgai is also used to refer to the overall micro-relief in such areas, consisting of mounds and depressions. The word gilgai came into English from both Wiradjuri and Gamiliarraay languages. The pools are commonly a few metres across and less than 30 cm (12 in) deep but, in some instances, they may be several metres deep and up to 100 m (330 ft) across. Gilgais are found worldwide wherever there are cracking clay soils and marked wet and dry seasons. Gilgais are also called melonholes, crabholes, hogwallows, or puff and shelf formations.

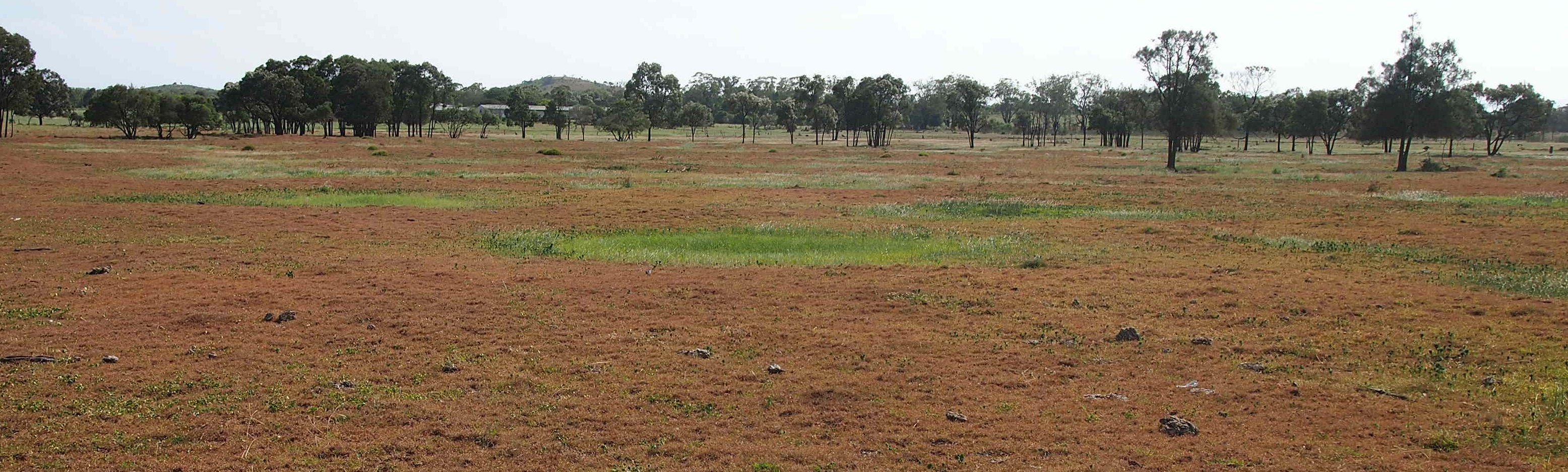
A gilgai landscape, Queensland

== Formation ==
Gilgais are thought to form in vertisols through repeated cycles of swelling when wet and subsequent shrinkage upon drying. That action, known as argillipedoturbation, causes the soil to crack when dry, allowing loose soil material to fill the cracks. When the soil swells upon subsequent re-wetting, the soil pressure cannot be dispersed into the now-full cracks and the soil is forced sideways causing a mound to form between cracks and a depression to form at the location of the crack. That process is then exaggerated as the depressions hold water and thus become wetter and swell more than the mounds, causing even greater shrinkage and cracking. In addition, the cracks channel water deeply into the soil, causing even greater swelling and subsequent cracking of the depression areas. Each cycle of swelling, shrinkage and cracking becomes more exaggerated and the landscape eventually becomes covered by a repeated pattern of mounds and depressions. The depressions hold surface water during wet seasons.

== Distribution ==
Australia has an abundance of cracking clay soils and large areas dominated by pronounced wet and dry seasons, providing ideal circumstances for gilgais to form. Central Russia and several parts of the United States, including South Dakota, Mississippi, and Texas also host the formations. Gilgais are structurally similar to the patterned ground of frigid regions, but periglacial soil polygons are formed instead, by repeated freeze-thaw cycles.

== Relation to humans ==
Gilgais were an important water source for Indigenous Australians, enabling them to forage over areas that lacked permanent water. Similarly, they allowed the stock of early Australian pastoralists to graze those areas. The introduction of wells and pumps reduced the value of gilgais to humans as a source of water. Many farmers now generally regard them as a nuisance. The movement of soil associated with gilgai formation damages infrastructure, including building foundations, roads and railway lines, and the undulations interfere with crop harvesting. The presence of seasonal water in grazing land makes it more difficult to control stock and provides a water supply for feral animals and kangaroos.

Gilgais remain of great ecological significance as a source of water for animal and plant life. Crayfish burrow in the wet basins and ants build up the mounds, magnifying the formations through bioturbation.

== See also ==
- Mima mound
- Bay of Biscay soil
