= Stone line =

Three dimensional subsurface layer or carpet of stones

A stone line (see also Stonelayer) is a three-dimensional subsurface layer, or ‘carpet,’ of stones evident as a ‘line of stones’ in natural exposures such as soils, road cuts, and trenches. Stone lines that are more than one stone thick have been called ‘stone zones’. Stone lines and stone zones are known to occur in soils, paleosols (buried soils), and in non-soil geologic-stratigraphic sequences. Where present in stratigraphic sequences, if the units were deposited by running water, the stones are usually imbricated (individual stones are lapped, or leaning, upon one another in the direction of water flow). This is strong evidence that such stone lines are geogenic. On the other hand, a stone line that is present in a soil or a paleosol is invariable non-imbricated and follows (mimics) the surface topography of the soil, or the paleosurface of a paleosol. This is strong evidence that such stone lines are pedogenic, and produced by soil forming processes. As it turns out, experience has shown that most stone lines are indeed associated with soils and paleosols, and most are consequently assumed to be pedogenic. How stone lines form, whether geogenically by geologic processes or pedogenically by soil forming processes is invariably a matter of interpretation (see Soil Biomantle). And whether the interpretation is geogenic or pedogenic often reflects the background and training of the interpreter.
