= Soil biomantle =

Organic-rich bioturbated upper part of the soil

The soil biomantle can be described and defined in several ways. Most simply, the soil biomantle is the organic-rich bioturbated upper part of the soil, including the topsoil where most biota live, reproduce, die, and become assimilated. The biomantle is thus the upper zone of soil that is predominantly a product of organic activity and the area where bioturbation is a dominant process.

Soil bioturbation consists predominantly of three subsets: faunalturbation (animal burrowings), floralturbation (root growth, tree-uprootings), and fungiturbation (mycelia growth). All three processes promote soil parent material destratification, mixing, and often particle size sorting, leading with other processes to the formation of soil and its horizons. While the general term bioturbation refers mainly to these three mixing processes, unless otherwise specified it is commonly used as a synonym to faunalturbation (animal burrowings).

== One- and two-layered biomantles, soil stonelayers (stone lines) ==
The biomantle includes the topsoil, or A horizon of soils, and also, any underlying lighter-colored (E) horizon that may be present. For midlatitude and subtropical soils that have typical A-E-B-C horizons and profiles, the biomantle is normally that part above the B horizon. In gravelly parent materials where soil particle biosorting by animals has led to the formation of a stonelayer horizon (SL), the base of the stonelayer (SL) defines the base of the biomantle. Biomantles with basal stonelayers are two-layered biomantles that form in parent materials with heterogeneous particle sizes (mixtures of fines and gravels); those lacking stonelayers are one-layered biomantles that form in homogeneous materials (either sands, loess, or gravels of approximately uniform size). If two-layered, the soil profile horizon notations in midlatitude and some subtropical soils are: A-E-SL-B-C, where the A-E-SL horizons constitute the biomantle.

Since midlatitude type Bt (argillic) horizons are often lacking in tropical soils owing to an abundance of active and deep bioturbators that move large volumes of soil to the surface (ants, termites, worms, etc.), horizon notations are: M-SL-W, where M is the mineral soil (extended topsoil), SL is stonelayer, and W is the underlying weathered or saprolite zone. In this tropical soil scheme the M horizon is the main biomantle and the SL horizon constitutes its base. Stonelayers occupy the base of biomantles in many, if not most, tropical soils and in many midlatitude soils. Where present they often function as subsurface "French drains" for soil-water movements and storage.

== Biomantles and hydropedology processes ==
Because the soil biomantle is the main zone of bioturbation, it is invariably permeable and of low density. It thus plays several essential hydropedological roles in the environment. For example, it promotes the downward percolation of rainwater and snowmelt through often-abundant biochannels and interconnected biopores. The biomantle also promotes downslope soil-water (throughflow, interflow) movements if it is formed above a clay-enriched Bt (argillic) horizon, or above some other dense subsoil horizon (e.g., duripan, fragipan, etc.) or bedrock – all of which generally function as aquitards or aquicludes to vertical soil water flow. In such cases the stonelayer, if present, can actually function as an aquifer for free water flow. Hence it is not uncommon to see soil water seepage above Bt horizons on slopes where soil stonelayers outcrop. Ground water recharge can occur through any of these biomantle-related processes. Recharge, of course, can also occur when the soil dries appreciably and shrinks, as during droughts, which allows vertical leakage to temporarily occur immediately after drought-breaking rainfalls.

== Pedosphere, critical zone, biomantle interrelationships ==
The pedosphere, or soil, is the planetary interface where Earth's five great global 'spheres' interact. These are the atmosphere, biosphere, hydrosphere, lithosphere, and pedosphere. The "critical zone", a recent conceptual framework, encompasses the Earth's outer layer in which most surface and near-surface life sustaining processes operate. In practice and theory, the critical zone essentially equates to the pedosphere, whereas the 'biomantle' deals with the uppermost critical zone, or pedosphere, encompassing its epidermal layer (where most biota live).

== Latitudinal differences in biomantle thickness ==
In midlatitude soils where most bioturbation is relatively shallow, seasonal, and without many bioturbators, the biomantle is relatively thin, often less than 1–2 m thick. However, in humid tropical and subtropical erosionally stable regions where both greater volumes of soil are biotransfered and deeper bioturbations occur—and bioturbation is year-round and performed by more invertebrate animals (termites, ants, worms, etc.), the biomantle is often thicker, sometimes 5–6 m or more thick. Where such soils are formed in conjunction with saprolite production, the biomantle is the bioturbated zone above the structured (unbioturbated) saprolite, with its base commonly defined by a stonelayer. In most subtropical and tropical areas where deep and large volume bioturbators dwell, and in some midlatitudes like South Africa, such thick, two-layered biomantles (those with stonelayers) above structured saprolite are very common.

== Whole soil biomantles ==
In some desert soils, in many mountain soils with moderate to steep slopes, in many recently eroded bedrock soils, and in various other soils, the biomantle constitutes the entire soil. That is, neither soil horizons nor weathering zones underlie the biomantle. Such biomantles are whole-soil biomantles.

== The biofabric of biomantles ==
As originally defined, a biomantle must exhibit at least 50% biofabric. This criterion denotes small, often pelletized microbiofabric and mesobiofabric produced by invertebrates (ants, worms, termites), usually observed under hand lens or higher magnification (soil thin sections). The criterion, however, becomes moot and irrelevant in the case of megabiofabric produced in some biomantles – namely the cloddy and chunky surface-spoil heaps produced by small-to-large burrowing vertebrates (rodents, badgers, aardvarks, elephants) and by tree uprooting.

== Soil biomantles and archaeology ==

Apart from a few stratified cave sites—and those rare open-air sites where archaeological materials were deposited so rapidly that bioturbation and resultant destratifications failed to keep pace with deposition, most prehistoric cultural materials of the world reside in the soil biomantle. Such materials are thus mixed, and technically and theoretically out of its original context. Since many cultural materials (cleavers, choppers' core-stones, metates, manos, pestles, etc.) are invariably larger than burrow diameters of most key bioturbators at such sites (small rodents, ants, termites, worms), they settle downward and form a stonelayer, and thus become part of a two-layered biomantle. Smaller artifacts (flakes, debitage) often are homogenized throughout the upper biomantle, and commonly observed in recent bioturbational spoil heaps, like those produced by pocket gophers, moles, and mole-rats. Beginning with Darwin, the earthworm has been recognized as a key bioturbator of soil biomantles and human artifacts on many continents and islands.

== Ancient soil biomantles (Paleobiomantles) ==
Soil biomantles, and soils, have been forming from the time that life began inhabiting land. Although little formal work has been done on this interesting theme, important first steps are being made.

== Dynamic denudation, bioturbation and soil biomantle formation ==
The biomantle is an organic-rich near-surface layer in which bioturbation is a dominant process, with all other biological and more traditional soil processes normally being subsidiary (e.g., organic matter productions, eluviations-illuviations, weathering-biochemical transformations, wind and water erosions-depositions, freeze-thaw, dilations-contractions, shrink-swell, gravity movements, geochemical-capillary surface-wickings and precipitations, etc.). The expression dynamic denudation is the sum of all these processes, with bioturbation and organic impacts commonly dominant.

Plants play a key role in soil formation, both agronomically and silviculturally, and this role is reasonably well understood by geomorphologists, pedologists, soil scientists, farmers, gardeners, and others. However, the role of animals in soil formation, and in creating soil and soil horizons, and creating various soil-landscape entities (biomantles, Mima mounds, stone lines, etc.), has been poorly understood until recently.

Wilkinson and Humphreys offer evidence that "bioturbation appears to be the most active pedogenic process operating in many soils." While probably close to the mark, research over multiple decades strongly indicates that bioturbation is the dominant process in the upper part of most soils, notable exceptions possibly being vertisols and cryosols, where shrink-swell and freeze-thaw processes, respectively, appear dominant.

== Three notable bioturbation sub-processes and associated particle comminutions ==
Soil bioturbations consist of three upper soil disorganizing and organizing sub-processes that can overlap, and that collectively promote particle abrasions and size reductions, termed "particle comminution". The three bioturbation sub-processes are biomixing, biotransfers, and biosorting.

Biomixing refers to the kind of soil bioturbations typically caused by surface-, shallow-, and intermediate-burrowing vertebrates, such as rodents (pocket gophers, tuco-tucos, mole-rats), insectivores (moles), mustelids (badgers), canids (wolves, coyotes, foxes), marsupials (marsupial moles, wombats), aardvarks, armadillos, pigs, and other similar organisms. Though animal bioturbations are dominant, tree uprooting is still an important process.

Biotransfers refers to transfers of soil by animals, vertebrates or invertebrates, either to the surface, within the biomantle, or from lower levels. Biotransfers can be effected by any burrowing animal, but the term is most applicable to deep burrowing, so-called conveyor-belt animals, such as ants, termites, and worms. Termites, for example, may burrow downward many meters into weathered and unweathered parent material to collect moist soil for constructing their surface mounds (termitaria). Ants, particularly leaf-cutter ants, can also biotransfer tremendous amounts of soil to the surface in the process of excavating their innumerable multipurpose subterranean chambers. Enormous amounts of soil and sediment are annually biotransferred onto tropical-subtropical landscapes in this process, and even onto some midlatitude landscapes (e.g., Texas, Louisiana), resulting in notably thick biomantles on stable (low slope) surfaces.

Biosorting refers to particle sorting, typically in gravelly (mixed particle) soils, that leads to the formation of a stonelayer (SL) horizon at the base of the biomantle, which results in a two-layered biomantle. The process begins as animals burrow and only soil particles smaller than their burrow diameters are moved; larger particles settle downward as smaller particles are moved upward from below them. The stonelayer (SL) forms at rates roughly proportional to the numbers of bioturbators and the intensity and style of burrowing. Conveyor-belt soil invertebrates (ants, termites, worms, etc.) are the primary biosorters in most tropical, subtropical, and some midlatitude soils, and thus often produce deep, two-layered biomantles if the soils contain gravels, as many do. Small fossorial vertebrates (pocket gophers, moles, tuco tucos, etc.), on the other hand, tend to be dominant biosorters in many midlatitude soils, especially deserts, prairies, and steppes. In more humid areas, like northeastern U.S. and W. Europe, conveyor-belt ants and worms are probably dominant or co-dominant.
