= Black Banks Creek =

Stream in South Dakota, U.S.

Coordinates: 43°05′09″N 103°15′41″W

Black Banks Creek is a stream in the U.S. state of South Dakota.

Black Banks Creek is lined with vertisol giving its banks a black tint.

== See also ==
- List of rivers of South Dakota
