= Ichnofabric index =

Method to quantify bioturbation

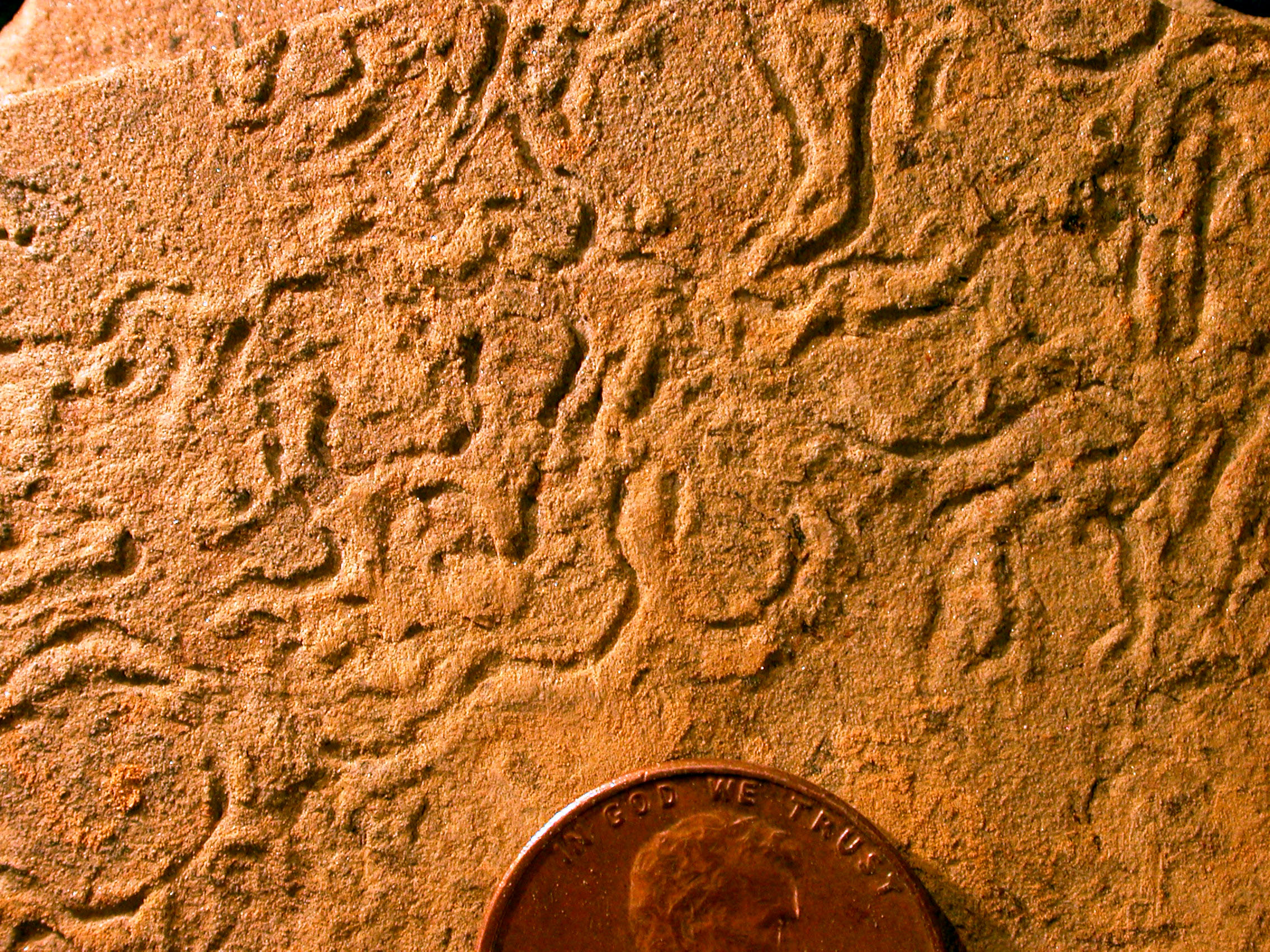
Trace fossils occupy a large proportion of this bedding plane.

The Droser-Bottjer ichnofabric index is a method used to quantify the degree of bioturbation in a sedimentary rock. It involves grading the amount of trace fossil activity on a scale of 1–6; a value of 1 indicates that bioturbation is entirely absent, whereas the highest grade would involve a bedding plane containing over 60% trace fossil cover.

== Application ==
Ichnofabric index can be applied in either a vertical or horizontal aspect. The vertical component provides an indication of the interplay between physical and chemical aspects of the environment and the degree of biological activity. The vertical ichnofossil index is harder to measure; it involves quantifying the amount of disturbance to the original sedimentary fabric.
