= Bioturbation =

Reworking of soils and sediments by organisms

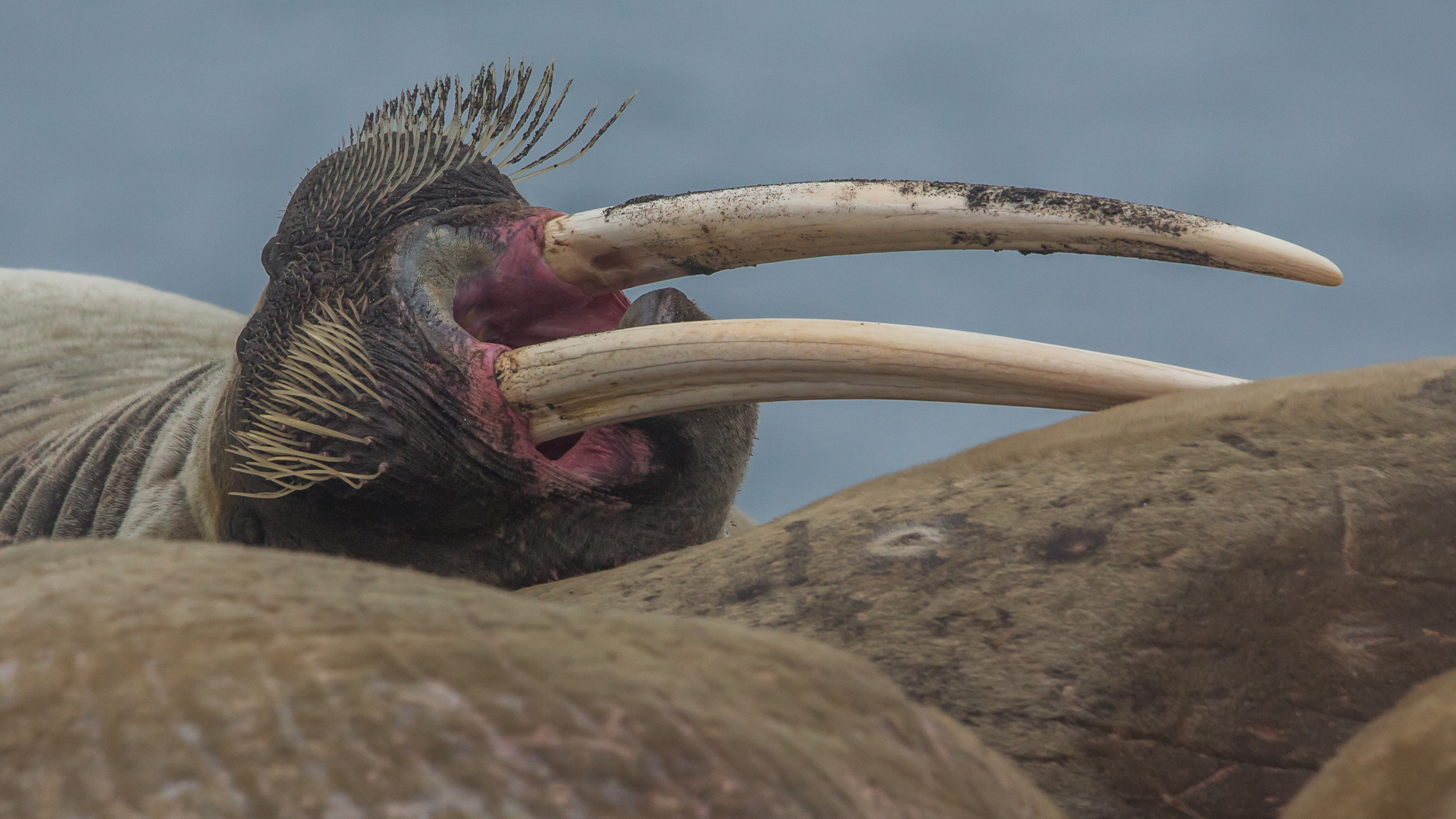
Sediment on the left tusk of a walrus. Walrus bioturbations in Arctic benthic sediments have large-scale ecosystem effects.

Bioturbation is defined as the reworking of soils and sediments by animals or plants. It includes burrowing, ingestion, and defecation of sediment grains. Bioturbating activities have a profound effect on the environment and are thought to be a primary driver of biodiversity. The formal study of bioturbation began in the 1800s by Charles Darwin experimenting in his garden. The disruption of aquatic sediments and terrestrial soils through bioturbating activities provides significant ecosystem services. These include the alteration of nutrients in aquatic sediment and overlying water, shelter to other species in the form of burrows in terrestrial and water ecosystems, and soil production on land.

Bioturbators are deemed ecosystem engineers because they alter resource availability to other species through the physical changes they make to their environments. This type of ecosystem change affects the evolution of cohabitating species and the environment, which is evident in trace fossils left in marine and terrestrial sediments. Other bioturbation effects include altering the texture of sediments (diagenesis), bioirrigation, and displacement of microorganisms and non-living particles. Bioturbation is sometimes confused with the process of bioirrigation, however these processes differ in what they are mixing; bioirrigation refers to the mixing of water and solutes in sediments and is an effect of bioturbation.

Walruses, salmon, and pocket gophers are examples of large bioturbators. Although the activities of these large macrofaunal bioturbators are more conspicuous, the dominant bioturbators are small invertebrates, such as earthworms, polychaetes, ghost shrimp, mud shrimp, and midge larvae. The activities of these small invertebrates, which include burrowing and ingestion and defecation of sediment grains, contribute to mixing and the alteration of sediment structure.

== Functional groups ==
Bioturbators have been organized by a variety of functional groupings based on either ecological characteristics or biogeochemical effects. While the prevailing categorization is based on the way bioturbators transport and interact with sediments, the various groupings likely stem from the relevance of a categorization mode to a field of study (such as ecology or sediment biogeochemistry) and an attempt to concisely organize the wide variety of bioturbating organisms in classes that describe their function. Examples of categorizations include those based on feeding and motility, feeding and biological interactions, and mobility modes. The most common set of groupings are based on sediment transport and are as follows:

- Gallery-diffusers create complex tube networks within the upper sediment layers and transport sediment through feeding, burrow construction, and general movement throughout their galleries. Gallery-diffusers are heavily associated with burrowing polychaetes, such as Nereis diversicolor and Marenzelleria spp.
- Biodiffusers transport sediment particles randomly over short distances as they move through sediments. Animals mostly attributed to this category include bivalves such as clams, and amphipod species, but can also include larger vertebrates, such as bottom-dwelling fish and rays that feed along the sea floor. Biodiffusers can be further divided into two subgroups, which include epifaunal (organisms that live on the surface sediments) biodiffusers and surface biodiffusers. This subgrouping may also include gallery-diffusers, reducing the number of functional groups.
- Upward-conveyors are oriented head-down in sediments, where they feed at depth and transport sediment through their guts to the sediment surface. Major upward-conveyor groups include burrowing polychaetes like the lugworm, Arenicola marina, and thalassinid shrimps.
- Downward-conveyor species are oriented with their heads towards the sediment-water interface and defecation occurs at depth. Their activities transport sediment from the surface to deeper sediment layers as they feed. Notable downward-conveyors include those in the peanut worm family, Sipunculidae.
- Regenerators are categorized by their ability to release sediment to the overlying water column, which is then dispersed as they burrow. After regenerators abandon their burrows, water flow at the sediment surface can push in and collapse the burrow. Examples of regenerator species include fiddler and ghost crabs.

== Ecological roles ==
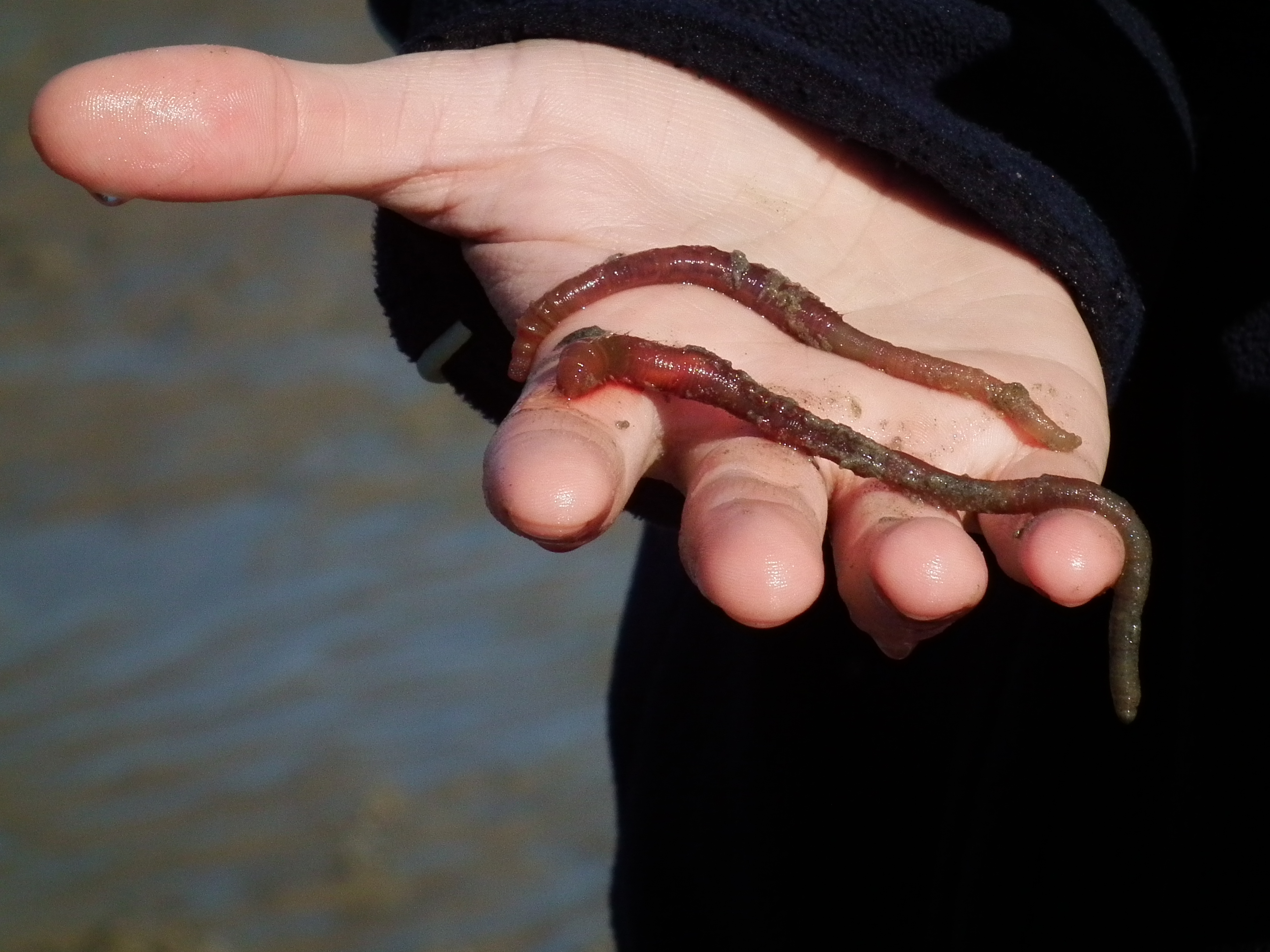
The lugworm Arenicola marina

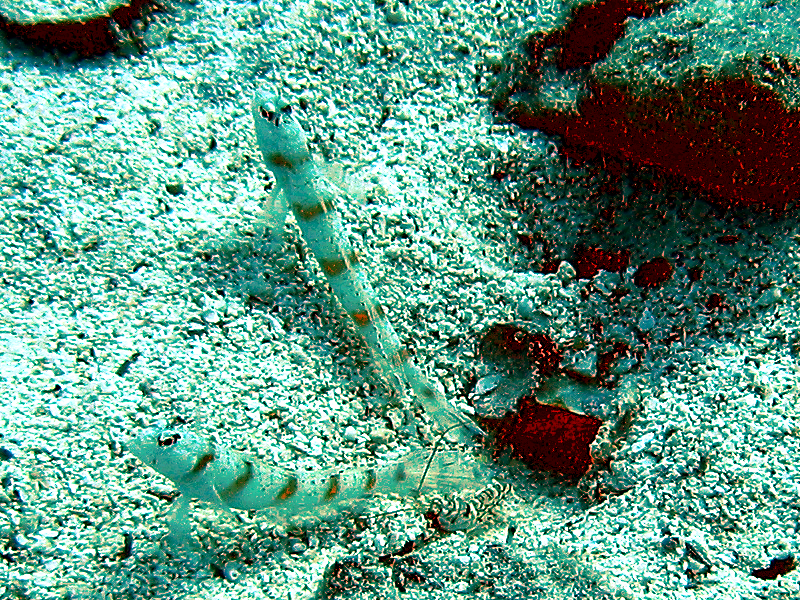
Gobies keeping watch outside a shrimp burrow

The evaluation of the ecological role of bioturbators has largely been species-specific. However, their ability to transport solutes, such as dissolved oxygen, enhance organic matter decomposition and diagenesis, and alter sediment structure has made them important for the survival and colonization by other macrofaunal and microbial communities.

Microbial communities are greatly influenced by bioturbator activities, as increased transport of more energetically favorable oxidants, such as oxygen, to typically highly reduced sediments at depth alters the microbial metabolic processes occurring around burrows. As bioturbators burrow, they also increase the surface area of sediments across which oxidized and reduced solutes can be exchanged, thereby increasing the overall sediment metabolism. This increase in sediment metabolism and microbial activity further results in enhanced organic matter decomposition and sediment oxygen uptake. In addition to the effects of burrowing activity on microbial communities, studies suggest that bioturbator fecal matter provides a highly nutritious food source for microbes and other macrofauna, thus enhancing benthic microbial activity. This increased microbial activity by bioturbators can contribute to increased nutrient release to the overlying water column. Nutrients released from enhanced microbial decomposition of organic matter, notably limiting nutrients, such as ammonium, can have bottom-up effects on ecosystems and result in increased growth of phytoplankton and bacterioplankton.

Burrows offer protection from predation and harsh environmental conditions. For example, termites (Macrotermes bellicosus) burrow and create mounds that have a complex system of air ducts and evaporation devices that create a suitable microclimate in an unfavorable physical environment. Many species are attracted to bioturbator burrows because of their protective capabilities. The shared use of burrows has enabled the evolution of symbiotic relationships between bioturbators and the many species that utilize their burrows. For example, gobies, scale-worms, and crabs live in the burrows made by innkeeper worms. Social interactions provide evidence of co-evolution between hosts and their burrow symbionts. This is exemplified by shrimp-goby associations. Shrimp burrows provide shelter for gobies and gobies serve as a scout at the mouth of the burrow, signaling the presence of potential danger. In contrast, the blind goby Typhlogobius californiensis lives within the deep portion of Callianassa shrimp burrows where there is not much light. The blind goby is an example of a species that is an obligate commensalist, meaning their existence depends on the host bioturbator and its burrow. Although newly hatched blind gobies have fully developed eyes, their eyes become withdrawn and covered by skin as they develop. They show evidence of commensal morphological evolution because it is hypothesized that the lack of light in the burrows where the blind gobies reside is responsible for the evolutionary loss of functional eyes.

Bioturbators can also inhibit the presence of other benthic organisms by smothering, exposing other organisms to predators, or resource competition. While thalassinidean shrimps can provide shelter for some organisms and cultivate interspecies relationships within burrows, they have also been shown to have strong negative effects on other species, especially those of bivalves and surface-grazing gastropods, because thalassinidean shrimps can smother bivalves when they resuspend sediment. They have also been shown to exclude or inhibit polychaetes, cumaceans, and amphipods. This has become a serious issue in the northwestern United States, as ghost and mud shrimp (thalassinidean shrimp) are considered pests to bivalve aquaculture operations. The presence of bioturbators can have both negative and positive effects on the recruitment of larvae of conspecifics (those of the same species) and those of other species, as the resuspension of sediments and alteration of flow at the sediment-water interface can affect the ability of larvae to burrow and remain in sediments. This effect is largely species-specific, as species differences in resuspension and burrowing modes have variable effects on fluid dynamics at the sediment-water interface. Deposit-feeding bioturbators may also hamper recruitment by consuming recently settled larvae.

== Biogeochemical effects ==
Since its onset around 539 million years ago, bioturbation has been responsible for changes in ocean chemistry, primarily through nutrient cycling. Bioturbators played, and continue to play, an important role in nutrient transport across sediments.

For example, bioturbating animals are hypothesized to have affected the cycling of sulfur in the early oceans. According to this hypothesis, bioturbating activities had a large effect on the sulfate concentration in the ocean. Around the Cambrian-Precambrian boundary (539 million years ago), animals begin to mix reduced sulfur from ocean sediments to overlying water causing sulfide to oxidize, which increased the sulfate composition in the ocean. During large extinction events, the sulfate concentration in the ocean was reduced. Although this is difficult to measure directly, seawater sulfur isotope compositions during these times indicates bioturbators influenced the sulfur cycling in the early Earth.

Bioturbators have also altered phosphorus cycling on geologic scales. Bioturbators mix readily available particulate organic phosphorus (P) deeper into ocean sediment layers which prevents the precipitation of phosphorus (mineralization) by increasing the sequestration of phosphorus above normal chemical rates. The sequestration of phosphorus limits oxygen concentrations by decreasing production on a geologic time scale. This decrease in production results in an overall decrease in oxygen levels, and it has been proposed that the rise of bioturbation corresponds to a decrease in oxygen levels of that time. The negative feedback of animals sequestering phosphorus in the sediments and subsequently reducing oxygen concentrations in the environment limits the intensity of bioturbation in this early environment.

=== Organic contaminants ===
Bioturbation can either enhance or reduce the flux of contaminants from the sediment to the water column, depending on the mechanism of sediment transport. In polluted sediments, bioturbating animals can mix the surface layer and cause the release of sequestered contaminants into the water column. Upward-conveyor species, like polychaete worms, are efficient at moving contaminated particles to the surface. Invasive animals can remobilize contaminants previously considered to be buried at a safe depth. In the Baltic Sea, the invasive Marenzelleria species of polychaete worms can burrow to 35-50 centimeters which is deeper than native animals, thereby releasing previously sequestered contaminants. However, bioturbating animals that live in the sediment (infauna) can also reduce the flux of contaminants to the water column by burying hydrophobic organic contaminants into the sediment. Burial of uncontaminated particles by bioturbating organisms provides more absorptive surfaces to sequester chemical pollutants in the sediments.

== Ecosystem impacts ==
Nutrient cycling is still affected by bioturbation in the modern Earth. Some examples in the terrestrial and aquatic ecosystems are below.

=== Terrestrial ===
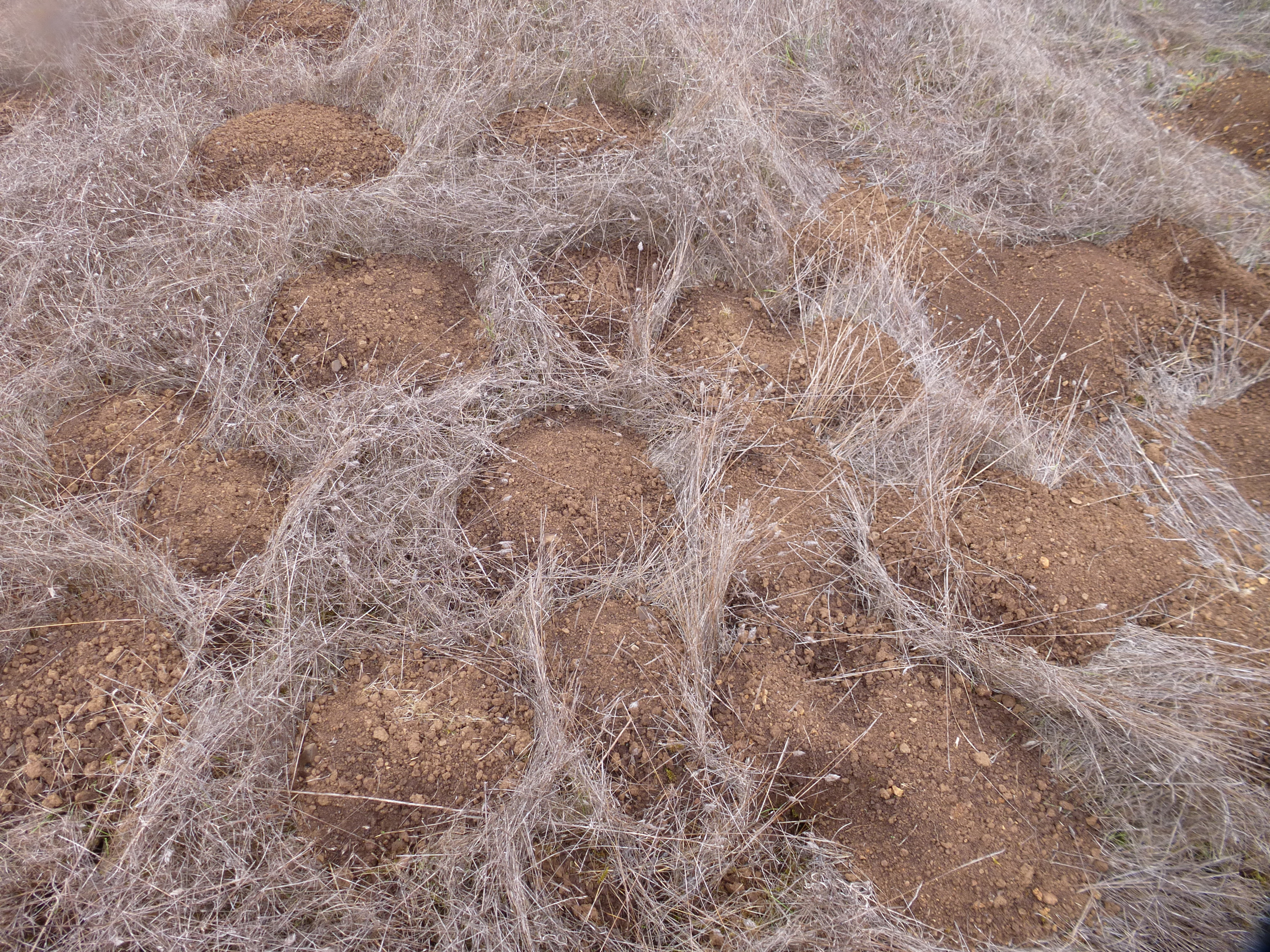
Pocket gopher mounds

Plants and animals utilize soil for food and shelter, disturbing the upper soil layers and transporting chemically weathered rock called saprolite from the lower soil depths to the surface. Terrestrial bioturbation is important in soil production, burial, organic matter content, and downslope transport. Tree roots are sources of soil organic matter, with root growth and stump decay also contributing to soil transport and mixing. Death and decay of tree roots first delivers organic matter to the soil and then creates voids, decreasing soil density. Tree uprooting causes considerable soil displacement by producing mounds, mixing the soil, or inverting vertical sections of soil.

Burrowing animals, such as earth worms and small mammals, form passageways for air and water transport which changes the soil properties, such as the vertical particle-size distribution, soil porosity, and nutrient content. Invertebrates that burrow and consume plant detritus help produce an organic-rich topsoil known as the soil biomantle, and thus contribute to the formation of soil horizons. Small mammals such as pocket gophers also play an important role in the production of soil, possibly with an equal magnitude to abiotic processes. Pocket gophers form above-ground mounds, which moves soil from the lower soil horizons to the surface, exposing minimally weathered rock to surface erosion processes, speeding soil formation. Pocket gophers are thought to play an important role in the downslope transport of soil, as the soil that forms their mounds is more susceptible to erosion and subsequent transport. Similar to tree root effects, the construction of burrows-even when backfilled- decreases soil density. The formation of surface mounds also buries surface vegetation, creating nutrient hotspots when the vegetation decomposes, increasing soil organic matter. Due to the high metabolic demands of their burrow-excavating subterranean lifestyle, pocket gophers must consume large amounts of plant material. Though this has a detrimental effect on individual plants, the net effect of pocket gophers is increased plant growth from their positive effects on soil nutrient content and physical soil properties.

=== Freshwater ===
Important sources of bioturbation in freshwater ecosystems include benthivorous (bottom-dwelling) fish, macroinvertebrates such as worms, insect larvae, crustaceans and molluscs, and seasonal influences from anadromous (migrating) fish such as salmon. Anadromous fish migrate from the sea into fresh-water rivers and streams to spawn. Macroinvertebrates act as biological pumps for moving material between the sediments and water column, feeding on sediment organic matter and transporting mineralized nutrients into the water column. Both benthivorous and anadromous fish can affect ecosystems by decreasing primary production through sediment re-suspension, the subsequent displacement of benthic primary producers, and recycling nutrients from the sediment back into the water column.

==== Lakes and ponds ====
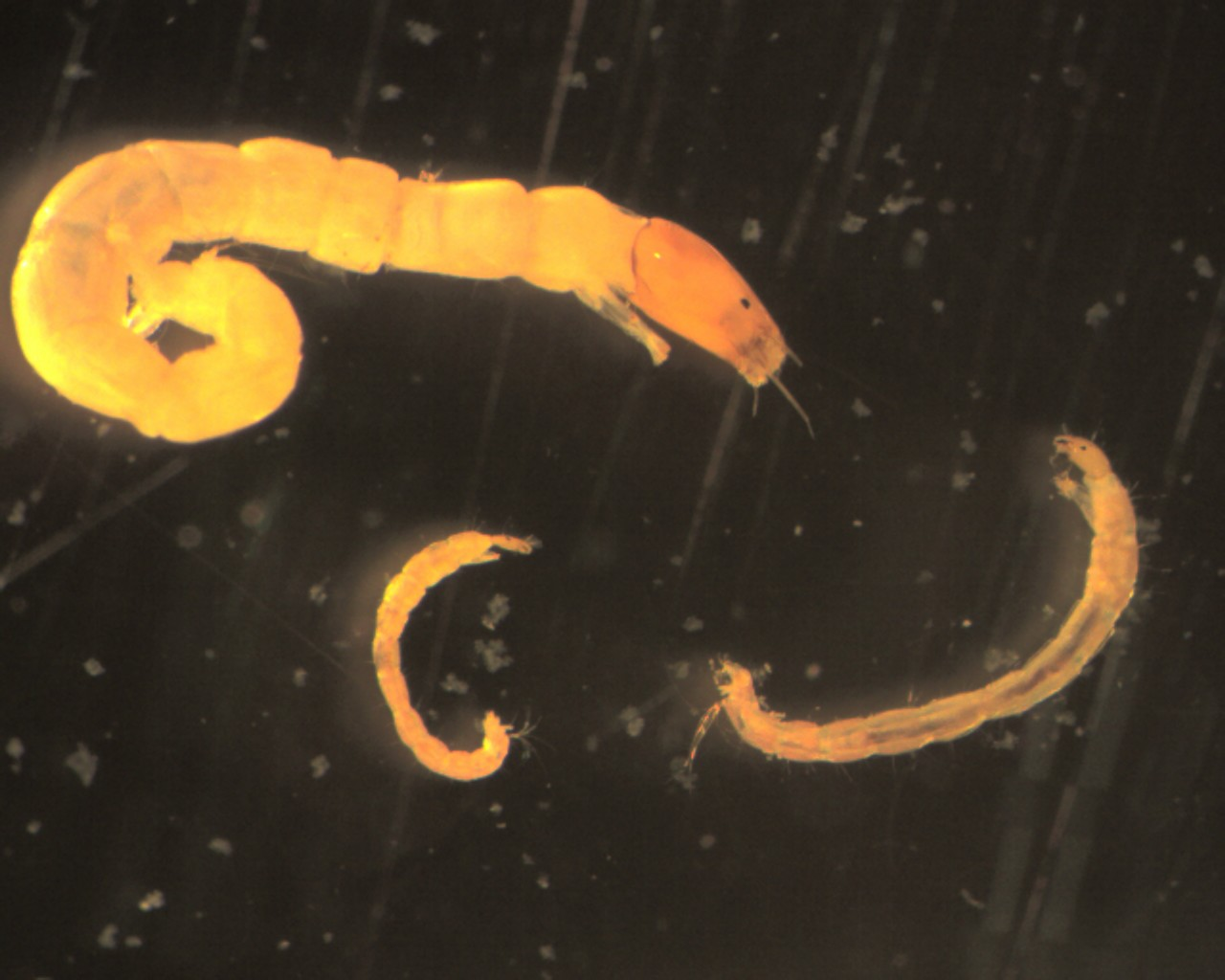
Chironomid larvae.

The sediments of lake and pond ecosystems are rich in organic matter, with higher organic matter and nutrient contents in the sediments than in the overlying water. Nutrient re-regeneration through sediment bioturbation moves nutrients into the water column, thereby enhancing the growth of aquatic plants and phytoplankton (primary producers). The major nutrients of interest in this flux are nitrogen and phosphorus, which often limit the levels of primary production in an ecosystem. Bioturbation increases the flux of mineralized (inorganic) forms of these elements, which can be directly used by primary producers. In addition, bioturbation increases the water column concentrations of nitrogen and phosphorus-containing organic matter, which can then be consumed by fauna and mineralized.

Lake and pond sediments often transition from the aerobic (oxygen containing) character of the overlaying water to the anaerobic (without oxygen) conditions of the lower sediment over sediment depths of only a few millimeters, therefore, even bioturbators of modest size can affect this transition of the chemical characteristics of sediments. By mixing anaerobic sediments into the water column, bioturbators allow aerobic processes to interact with the re-suspended sediments and the newly exposed bottom sediment surfaces.

Macroinvertebrates including chironomid (non-biting midges) larvae and tubificid worms (detritus worms) are important agents of bioturbation in these ecosystems and have different effects based on their respective feeding habits. Tubificid worms do not form burrows, they are upward conveyors. Chironomids, on the other hand, form burrows in the sediment, acting as bioirrigators and aerating the sediments and are downward conveyors. This activity, combined with chironomid's respiration within their burrows, decrease available oxygen in the sediment and increase the loss of nitrates through enhanced rates of denitrification.

The increased oxygen input to sediments by macroinvertebrate bioirrigation coupled with bioturbation at the sediment-water interface complicates the total flux of phosphorus. While bioturbation results in a net flux of phosphorus into the water column, the bio-irrigation of the sediments with oxygenated water enhances the adsorption of phosphorus onto iron-oxide compounds, thereby reducing the total flux of phosphorus into the water column.

The presence of macroinvertebrates in sediment can initiate bioturbation due to their status as an important food source for benthivorous fish such as carp. Of the bioturbating, benthivorous fish species, carp in particular are important ecosystem engineers and their foraging and burrowing activities can alter the water quality characteristics of ponds and lakes. Carp increase water turbidity by the re-suspension of benthic sediments. This increased turbidity limits light penetration and coupled with increased nutrient flux from the sediment into the water column, inhibits the growth of macrophytes (aquatic plants) favoring the growth of phytoplankton in the surface waters. Surface phytoplankton colonies benefit from both increased suspended nutrients and from recruitment of buried phytoplankton cells released from the sediments by the fish bioturbation. Macrophyte growth has also been shown to be inhibited by displacement from the bottom sediments due to fish burrowing.

==== Rivers and streams ====
River and stream ecosystems show similar responses to bioturbation activities, with chironomid larvae and tubificid worm macroinvertebrates remaining as important benthic agents of bioturbation. These environments can also be subject to strong season bioturbation effects from anadromous fish.

Salmon function as bioturbators on both gravel to sand-sized sediment and a nutrient scale, by moving and re-working sediments in the construction of redds (gravel depressions or "nests" containing eggs buried under a thin layer of sediment) in rivers and streams and by mobilization of nutrients. The construction of salmon redds functions to increase the ease of fluid movement (hydraulic conductivity) and porosity of the stream bed. In select rivers, if salmon congregate in large enough concentrations in a given area of the river, the total sediment transport from redd construction can equal or exceed the sediment transport from flood events. The net effect on sediment movement is the downstream transfer of gravel, sand and finer materials and enhancement of water mixing within the river substrate.

The construction of salmon redds increases sediment and nutrient fluxes through the hyporheic zone (area between surface water and groundwater) of rivers and effects the dispersion and retention of marine derived nutrients (MDN) within the river ecosystem. MDN are delivered to river and stream ecosystems by the fecal matter of spawning salmon and the decaying carcasses of salmon that have completed spawning and died. Numerical modeling suggests that residence time of MDN within a salmon spawning reach is inversely proportional to the amount of redd construction within the river. Measurements of respiration within a salmon-bearing river in Alaska further suggest that salmon bioturbation of the river bed plays a significant role in mobilizing MDN and limiting primary productivity while salmon spawning is active. The river ecosystem was found to switch from a net autotrophic to heterotrophic system in response to decreased primary production and increased respiration. The decreased primary production in this study was attributed to the loss of benthic primary producers who were dislodged due to bioturbation, while increased respiration was thought to be due to increased respiration of organic carbon, also attributed to sediment mobilization from salmon redd construction. While marine derived nutrients are generally thought to increase productivity in riparian and freshwater ecosystems, several studies have suggested that temporal effects of bioturbation should be considered when characterizing salmon influences on nutrient cycles.

=== Marine ===
Major marine bioturbators range from small infaunal invertebrates to fish and marine mammals. In most marine sediments, however, they are dominated by small invertebrates, including polychaetes, bivalves, burrowing shrimp, and amphipods.

==== Shallow and coastal ====
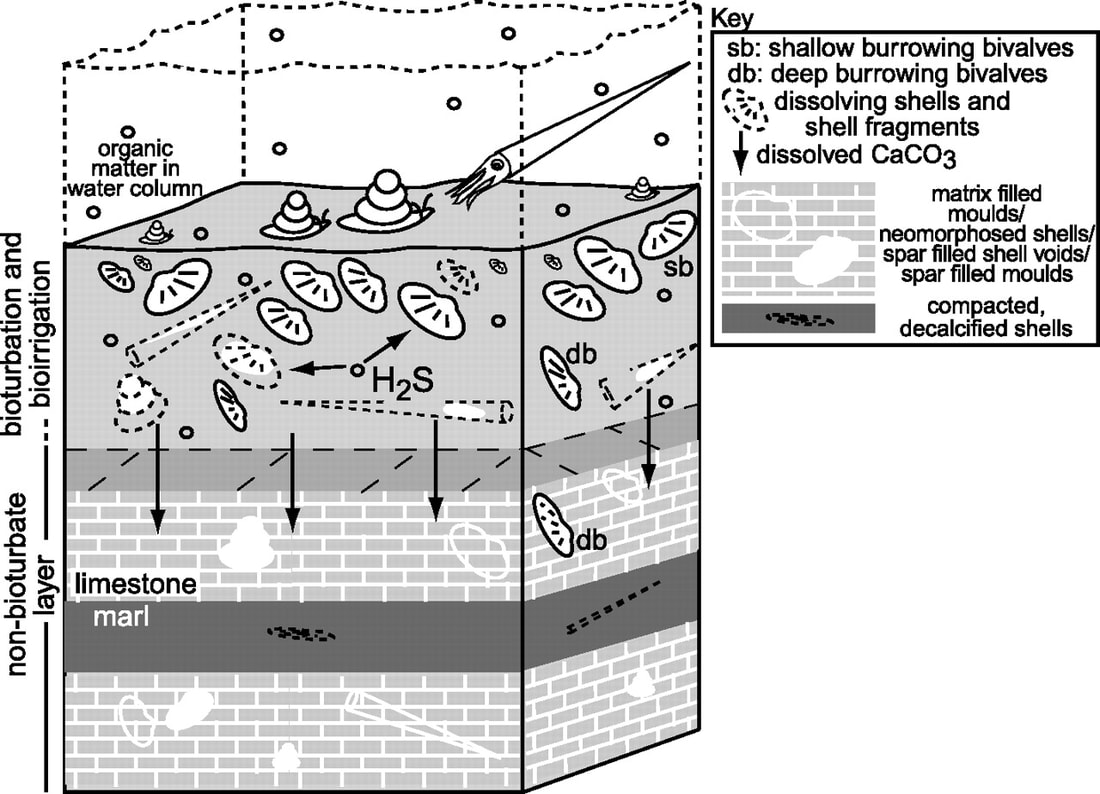
Bioturbation and bioirrigation in the sediment at the bottom of a coastal ecosystems

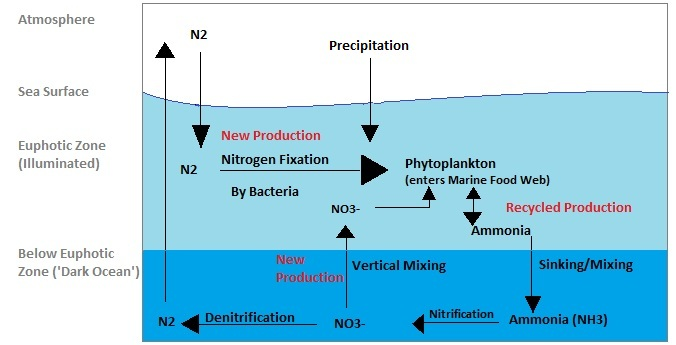
The marine nitrogen cycle

Coastal ecosystems, such as estuaries, are generally highly productive, which results in the accumulation of large quantities of detritus (organic waste). These large quantities, in addition to typically small sediment grain size and dense populations, make bioturbators important in estuarine respiration. Bioturbators enhance the transport of oxygen into sediments through irrigation and increase the surface area of oxygenated sediments through burrow construction. Bioturbators also transport organic matter deeper into sediments through general reworking activities and production of fecal matter. This ability to replenish oxygen and other solutes at sediment depth allows for enhanced respiration by both bioturbators as well as the microbial community, thus altering estuarine elemental cycling.

The effects of bioturbation on the nitrogen cycle are well-documented. Coupled denitrification and nitrification are enhanced due to increased oxygen and nitrate delivery to deep sediments and increased surface area across which oxygen and nitrate can be exchanged. The enhanced nitrification-denitrification coupling contributes to greater removal of biologically available nitrogen in shallow and coastal environments, which can be further enhanced by the excretion of ammonium by bioturbators and other organisms residing in bioturbator burrows. While both nitrification and denitrification are enhanced by bioturbation, the effects of bioturbators on denitrification rates have been found to be greater than that on rates of nitrification, further promoting the removal of biologically available nitrogen. This increased removal of biologically available nitrogen has been suggested to be linked to increased rates of nitrogen fixation in microenvironments within burrows, as indicated by evidence of nitrogen fixation by sulfate-reducing bacteria via the presence of nifH (nitrogenase) genes.

Bioturbation by walrus feeding is a significant source of sediment and biological community structure and nutrient flux in the Bering Sea. Walruses feed by digging their muzzles into the sediment and extracting clams through powerful suction. By digging through the sediment, walruses rapidly release large amounts of organic material and nutrients, especially ammonium, from the sediment to the water column. Additionally, walrus feeding behavior mixes and oxygenates the sediment and creates pits in the sediment which serve as new habitat structures for invertebrate larvae.

==== Deep sea ====
Bioturbation is important in the deep sea because deep-sea ecosystem functioning depends on the use and recycling of nutrients and organic inputs from the photic zone. In low energy regions (areas with relatively still water), bioturbation is the only force creating heterogeneity in solute concentration and mineral distribution in the sediment. It has been suggested that higher benthic diversity in the deep sea could lead to more bioturbation which, in turn, would increase the transport of organic matter and nutrients to benthic sediments. Through the consumption of surface-derived organic matter, animals living on the sediment surface facilitate the incorporation of particulate organic carbon (POC) into the sediment where it is consumed by sediment dwelling animals and bacteria. Incorporation of POC into the food webs of sediment dwelling animals promotes carbon sequestration by removing carbon from the water column and burying it in the sediment. In some deep-sea sediments, intense bioturbation enhances manganese and nitrogen cycling.

== Mathematical modelling ==
The role of bioturbators in sediment biogeochemistry makes bioturbation a common parameter in sediment biogeochemical models, which are often numerical models built using ordinary and partial differential equations. Bioturbation is typically represented as D_{B}, or the biodiffusion coefficient, and is described by a diffusion and, sometimes, an advective term. This representation and subsequent variations account for the different modes of mixing by functional groups and bioirrigation that results from them. The biodiffusion coefficient is usually measured using radioactive tracers such as Pb^{210}, radioisotopes from nuclear fallout, introduced particles including glass beads tagged with radioisotopes or inert fluorescent particles, and chlorophyll a. Biodiffusion models are then fit to vertical distributions (profiles) of tracers in sediments to provide values for D_{B}.

Parameterization of bioturbation, however, can vary, as newer and more complex models can be used to fit tracer profiles. Unlike the standard biodiffusion model, these more complex models, such as expanded versions of the biodiffusion model, random walk, and particle-tracking models, can provide more accuracy, incorporate different modes of sediment transport, and account for more spatial heterogeneity.

== Evolution ==
The onset of bioturbation had a profound effect on the environment and the evolution of other organisms. Bioturbation is thought to have been an important co-factor of the Cambrian Explosion, during which most major animal phyla appeared in the fossil record over a short time. Predation arose during this time and promoted the development of hard skeletons, for example bristles, spines, and shells, as a form of armored protection. It is hypothesized that bioturbation resulted from this skeleton formation. These new hard parts enabled animals to dig into the sediment to seek shelter from predators, which created an incentive for predators to search for prey in the sediment (see Evolutionary Arms Race). Burrowing species fed on buried organic matter in the sediment which resulted in the evolution of deposit feeding (consumption of organic matter within sediment). Prior to the development of bioturbation, laminated microbial mats were the dominant biological structures of the ocean floor and drove much of the ecosystem functions. As bioturbation increased, burrowing animals disturbed the microbial mat system and created a mixed sediment layer with greater biological and chemical diversity. This greater biological and chemical diversity is thought to have led to the evolution and diversification of seafloor-dwelling species.

An alternate, less widely accepted hypothesis for the origin of bioturbation exists. The trace fossil Nenoxites is thought to be the earliest record of bioturbation, predating the Cambrian Period. The fossil is dated to 555 million years, which places it in the Ediacaran Period. The fossil indicates a 5 centimeter depth of bioturbation in muddy sediments by a burrowing worm. This is consistent with food-seeking behavior, as there tended to be more food resources in the mud than the water column. However, this hypothesis requires more precise geological dating to rule out an early Cambrian origin for this specimen.

The evolution of trees during the Devonian Period enhanced soil weathering and increased the spread of soil due to bioturbation by tree roots. Root penetration and uprooting also enhanced soil carbon storage by enabling mineral weathering and the burial of organic matter.

=== Fossil record ===
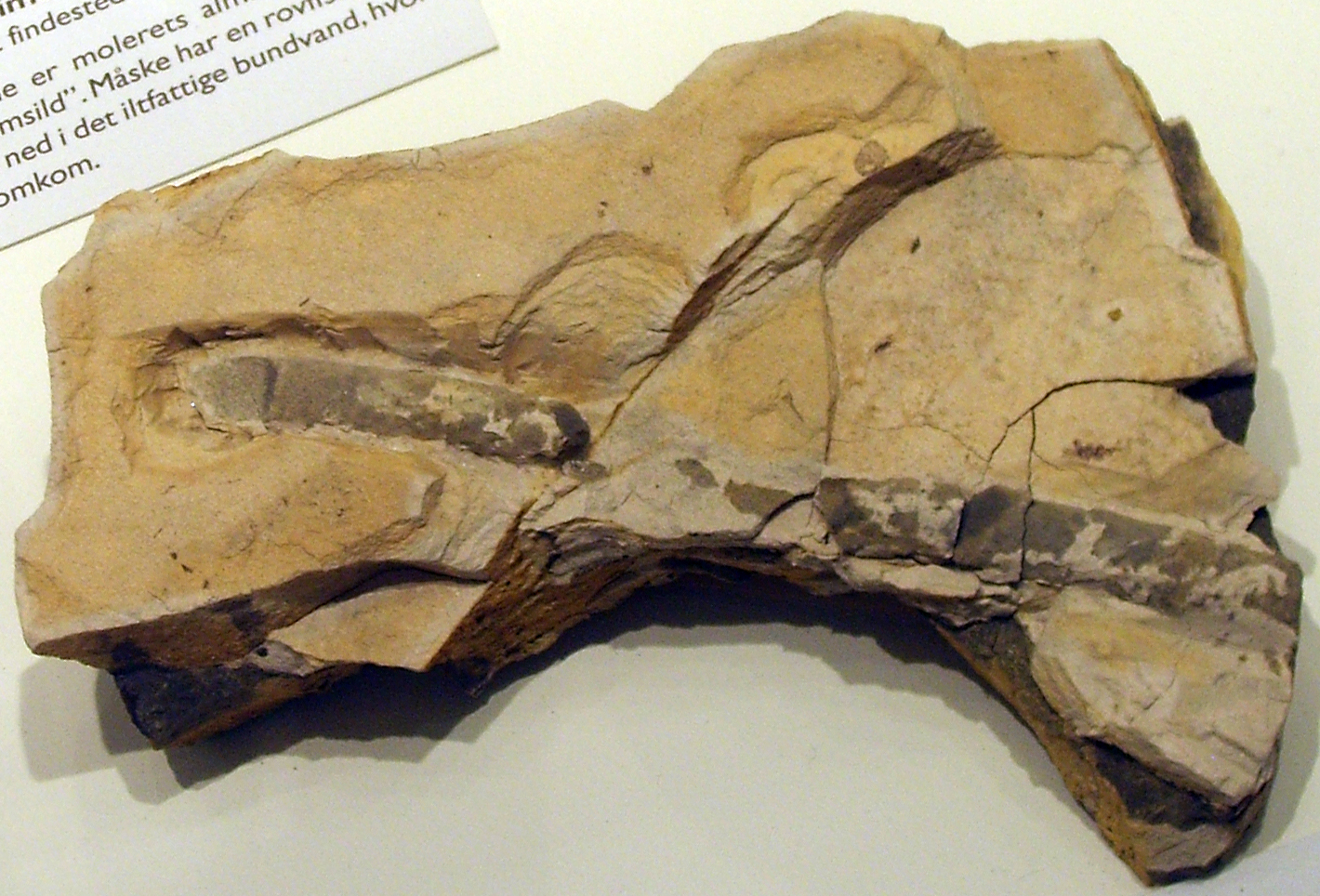
Planolite fossil

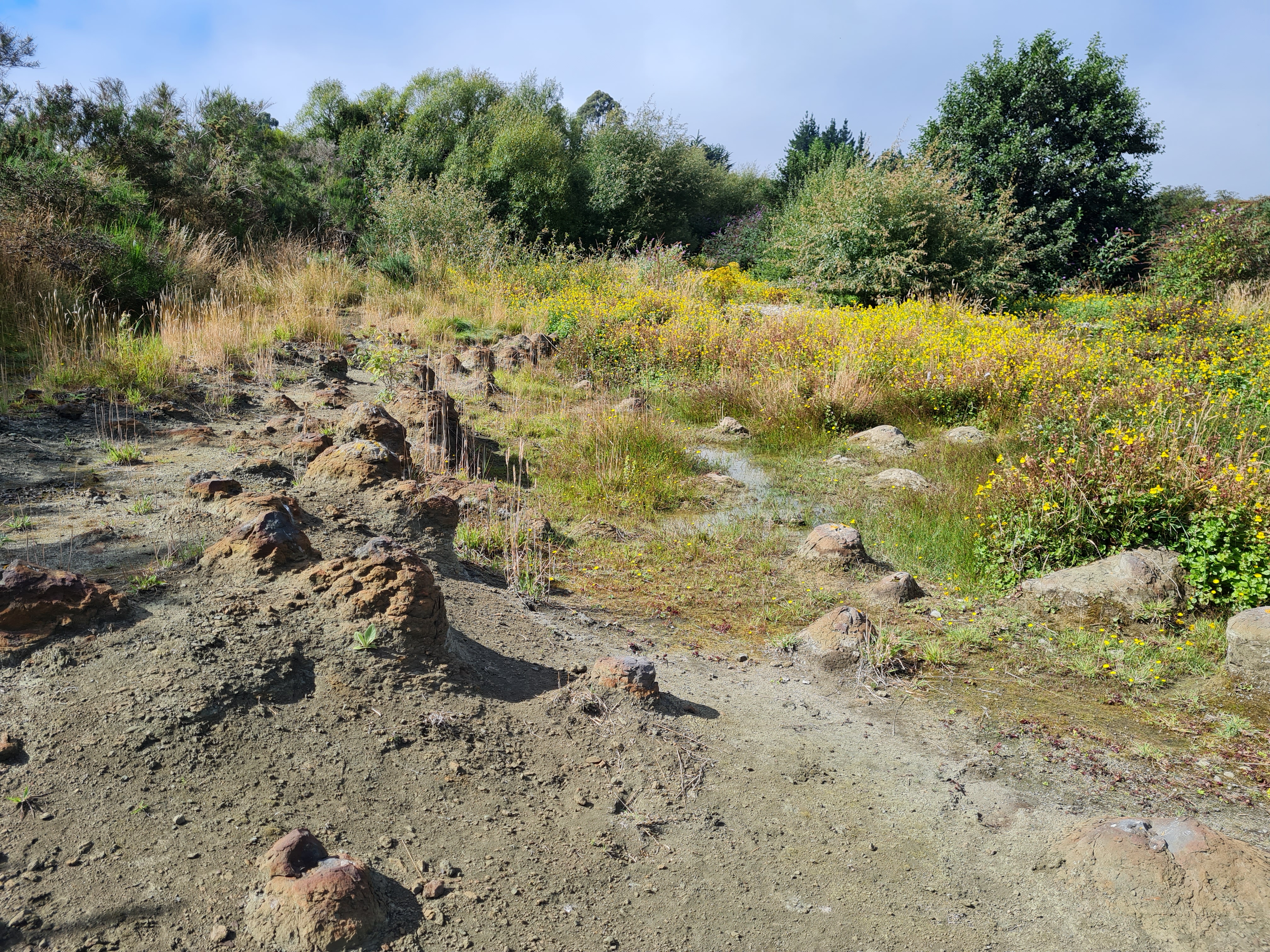
Trace fossils from bioturbation in Waianakarua South River, New Zealand

Patterns or traces of bioturbation are preserved in lithified rock. The study of such patterns is called ichnology, or the study of "trace fossils", which, in the case of bioturbators, are fossils left behind by digging or burrowing animals. This can be compared to the footprint left behind by these animals. In some cases bioturbation is so pervasive that it completely obliterates sedimentary structures, such as laminated layers or cross-bedding. Thus, it affects the disciplines of sedimentology and stratigraphy within geology. The study of bioturbator ichnofabrics uses the depth of the fossils, the cross-cutting of fossils, and the sharpness (or how well defined) of the fossil to assess the activity that occurred in old sediments. Typically the deeper the fossil, the better preserved and well defined the specimen.

Important trace fossils from bioturbation have been found in marine sediments from tidal, coastal and deep sea sediments. In addition sand dune, or Eolian, sediments are important for preserving a wide variety of fossils. Evidence of bioturbation has been found in deep-sea sediment cores including into long records, although the act extracting the core can disturb the signs of bioturbation, especially at shallower depths. Arthropods, in particular are important to the geologic record of bioturbation of Eolian sediments. Dune records show traces of burrowing animals as far back as the lower Mesozoic (250 Million years ago), although bioturbation in other sediments has been seen as far back as 550 Ma.

== Archaeology ==
Bioturbation's effects are not limited to the biological and are studied by archaeologists alongside geologists and biologists. Stratification is the process by which geologic layers (strata) are laid down over time. Archaeological strata are those layers of cultural and biological deposits that are present on an archaeological site. In stratigraphy, the Law of Stratification says that the topmost layer is the youngest layer, the next layer being older than the top layer but younger than the one below it, and so on. Stratigraphy is critical for archaeology because the relative age of strata helps to date the materials found within particular layers. For example, a clay pot found in the second layer from the top would be older than a metal tool found in the uppermost layer. Bioturbation's effect on stratigraphy and the study of the archaeological record is immense. By redistributing material vertically and horizontally, bioturbation confuses the archaeological record and makes relative dating of artifacts more difficult.

== Research history ==
Bioturbation's importance for soil processes and geomorphology was first realized by Charles Darwin, who devoted his last scientific book to the subject (The Formation of Vegetable Mould through the Action of Worms). Darwin spread chalk dust over a field to observe changes in the depth of the chalk layer over time. Excavations 30 years after the initial deposit of chalk revealed that the chalk was buried 18 centimeters under the sediment, which indicated a burial rate of 6 millimeters per year. Darwin attributed this burial to the activity of earthworms in the sediment and determined that these disruptions were important in soil formation. In 1891, geologist Nathaniel Shaler expanded Darwin's concept to include soil disruption by ants and trees. The term "bioturbation" was later coined by Rudolf Richter in 1952 to describe structures in sediment caused by living organisms. Since the 1980s, the term "bioturbation" has been widely used in soil and geomorphology literature to describe the reworking of soil and sediment by plants and animals.

== See also ==
- Argillipedoturbation
- Bioirrigation
- Zoophycos
