= Stonelayer =

Subsurface soil layer

A stonelayer, or soil stonelayer, or stone line, is a three-dimensional subsurface layer, or soil horizon, dominated by coarse particles (>2mm), that generally follows (mimics) the surface topography (Sharpe 1938). A stonelayer occupies the basal horizon of two-layered soil biomantles (Paton et al. 1995; Schaetzl and Anderson 2005; Fey 2009; Wilkinson et al. 2009). A stonelayer may be one stone thick, and thus appear in a trench or pit as a "stone line," or it may be several stones thick and appear as a "stone zone" (Johnson 1989). The gravel components of stonelayers may be compositionally variable, and while many are lithic clasts, often of quartzose composition, others may be metallic nodules and concretions of iron and manganese oxides, human artifacts, snail and clam shells (in highly calcareous soils), precious and semi-precious stones, or some combination thereof (Aleva 1983, 1987; Johnson 2002).

== History ==
Few topics in the annals of Earth science have generated more controversy and genetic uncertainty than have stonelayers (stone-lines) in soils and sediments. The controversy has involved the fields of archaeology, geography, geology, geomorphology, ecology, pedology, and soil science, has encompassed all continents except Antarctica, and occupies an extensive literature.

The term ‘stone-line’ was coined and defined in 1938 by Sharpe based on observations in South Carolina, and interpreted as a product of abiotic, more or less geogenic mass transfer on slopes. Sharpe was apparently unaware that predecessor names had been coined in the 19th and early 20th Centuries, involving such terms as “pebble line," “gravel sheet," “cascalho," and others, usually depending on the language employed and the countries where the observations were made. Nor, apparently, was Sharpe aware that such features earlier had been illustrated graphically—in England by Darwin (in 1840 and 1881), in Brazil by Hartt in 1870, in North America by Webster and Shaler (in 1888 and 1891 respectively), and by others. Neither was he aware that the feature had been interpreted between 1898 and the 1880s in the midcontinent of North America as an eroded lag on soils and paleosols that later became buried, and variously named “ferretto zone,” “pebble band,” “pebble concentrate,” plus others by such notable North American geologists as Bain, Sardeson, Calvin, Norton, Savage, Tilton, Leverett, and Kay, among others (Johnson et al. 2005).

In tropical and subtropical Brazil in the 1870s, Agassiz and Hartt viewed the stonelayer and material above it as evidence for glaciation, a view resurrected by others as recently as the 1960s. This two-layered unit was alternatively interpreted as an erosional pavement buried under tropical loess in the 1890s, a view re-adopted by others recently (1980s-2000s) for northern Argentina, Paraguay and southern Brazil. However, Morrás and colleagues (2009) have argued that stonelayers in these soils are basal components of [[soil biomantles]].

After World War II, the stonelayer was given new names, “carpedolith,” “chert-line,” “nappes de gravats,” “lit de cailloux d’epaisseur,” “concentration de quartz,” “linea de piedras,” “nodular layer,” “stiensohle,” “biogenic marker horizon,” “gravel horizon,” and “pedisediment,” among others. The common presence in them of human artifacts, precious-semiprecious stones (diamonds, emeralds, etc.) and metals (gold, silver, tin, etc.) has piqued the interest of geologists, geographers, archaeologists, mining specialists, and engineers (Aleva 1983, 1987; Brink 1985; Brink et al. 1982; Johnson et al. 2005; Ruhe 1959, 1969).

Some have attributed the explanatory controversy surrounding stonelayers to a perceived narrow and limiting 20th century theoretical-interpretive-explanatory tradition in pedology and soil science (Johnson et al. 2005; Johnson and Johnson 2006). According to this view, explanatory pedology has operated under a predominantly soil science utilitarian-conceptual approach, or model—the five factors (‘clorpt’) model—to map, classify, valuate, and “explain” soils (Jenny 1941; Soil Survey personnel 1951, 1975, 1991, 1993). While the model has greatly aided soil science, and spatially explains generalized soil-environmental relationships on landscapes, the device—supremely attractive in its parsimony—has constrained pedologic interpretation because its genetic-interpretive domain is constrained by its broad factorial (landscape context) tenets. The model allows for a wide-ranging generalized assessment of soilscapes, and is useful in soil chronosequence work (Birkeland 1974, 1984) but the biodynamic soil processes that are largely responsible in producing stonelayers are absent at a highest theoretical (five factors) level. Once mapped and classified, soils become static elements, which—while societally useful, scientifically misrepresents their true biodynamic nature. In a proposal to heal such Occam's razor wounds, process biodynamics supported with appropriate genetic language has been advanced to augment the traditional five factors genetic principles in pedology and soil-geomorphology. A process-biodynamic approach, with supporting genetic language, provides a way forward and fosters a fresh array of interpretive options.
