= Black Banks, Prince Edward Island =

Settlement in Prince Edward Island, Canada

Coordinates: 46.733°N 64.000°W

Location of Black Banks in Prince Edward Island

Black Banks is a settlement in the Canadian province of Prince Edward Island.

The name "Black Banks", comes from the black peat moss that covers the area. There also has been many shipwrecks in the general area, such as The Queen Elizabeth.
