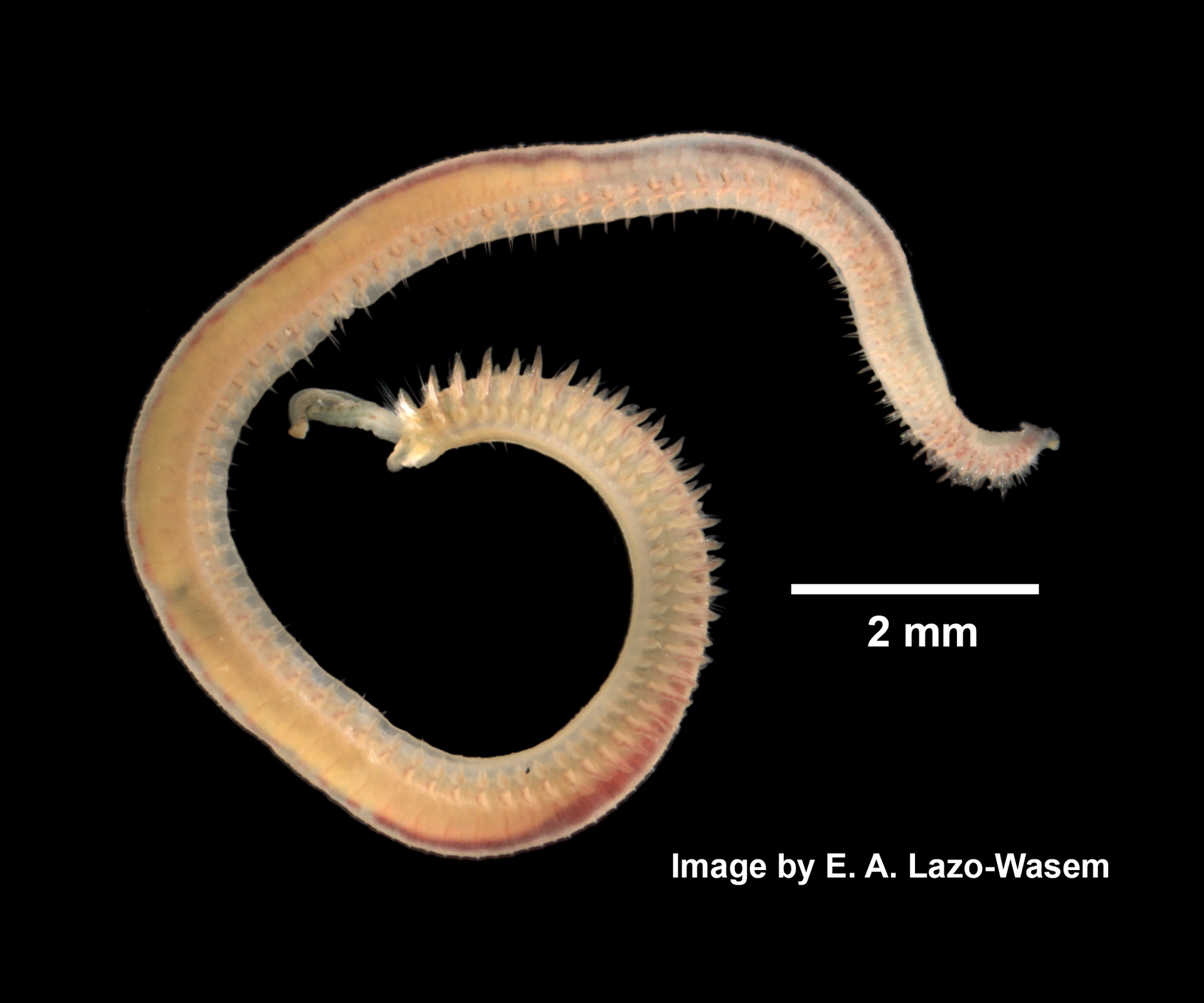
- Marenzelleria viridis.

Scientific classification
- Kingdom: Animalia
- Phylum: Annelida
- Clade: Pleistoannelida
- Clade: Sedentaria
- Order: Spionida
- Family: Spionidae
- Genus: Marenzelleria; Mesnil, 1896

= Marenzelleria =

Genus of annelids

Marenzelleria is a genus of polychaetes belonging to the family Spionidae. They occur in the marine and brackish water environments of mostly the northern hemisphere.

== Species ==
There are five recognized species:

- Marenzelleria arctia (Chamberlin, 1920)
- Marenzelleria bastropi Bick, 2005
- Marenzelleria neglecta Sikorski & Bick, 2004
- Marenzelleria viridis (Verrill, 1873)
- Marenzelleria wireni Augener, 1913
