= Bioirrigation =

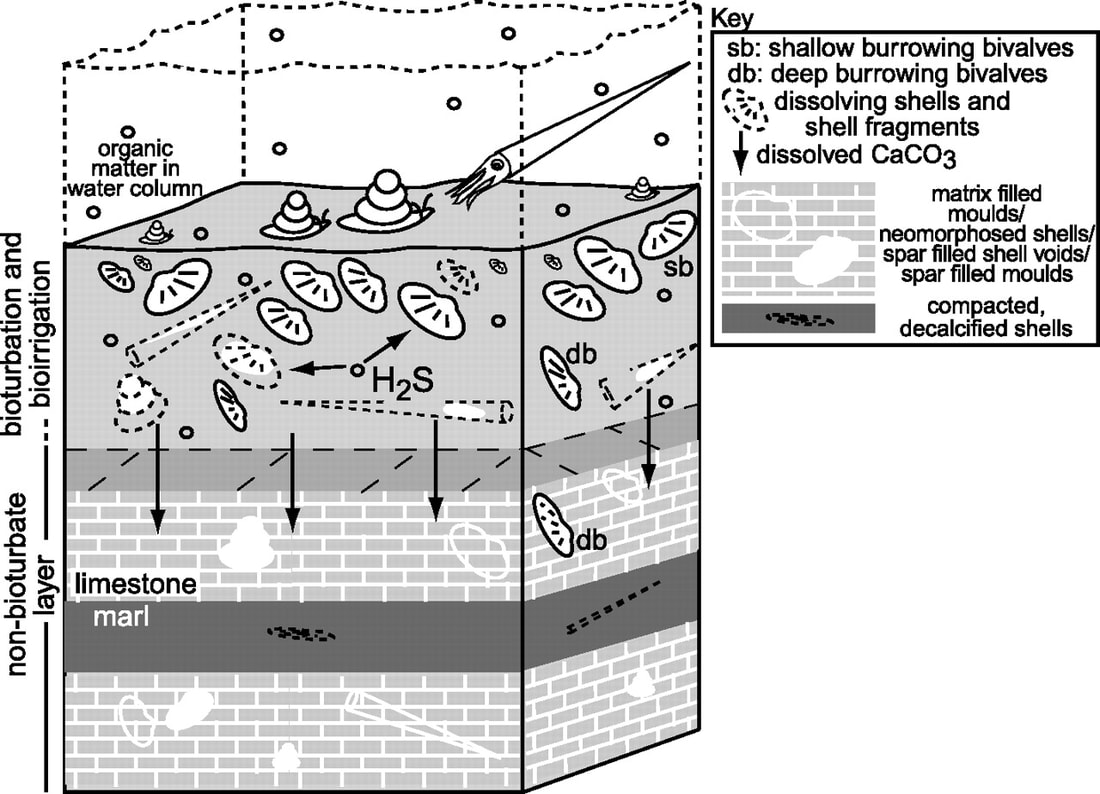
Bioturbation and bioirrigation in the sediment at the bottom of a coastal ecosystems

Bioirrigation refers to the process of benthic organisms flushing their burrows with overlying water. The exchange of dissolved substances between the porewater and overlying seawater that results is an important process in the context of the biogeochemistry of the oceans.

Marine coastal ecosystems often have organisms that destabilize sediment. They change the physical state of the sediment. Thus improving the conditions for other organisms and themselves. These organisms often also cause bioturbation, which is commonly used interchangeably or in reference with bioirrigation.

Bioirrigation works as two different processes. These processes are known as particle reworking and ventilation, which is the work of benthic macro-invertebrates (usually ones that burrow). This particle reworking and ventilation is caused by the organisms when they feed (faunal feeding), defecate, burrow, and respire.

Bioirrigation is responsible for a large amount of oxidative transport and has a large impact on biogeochemical cycles.

== Bioirrigation's Role in Elemental Cycling ==
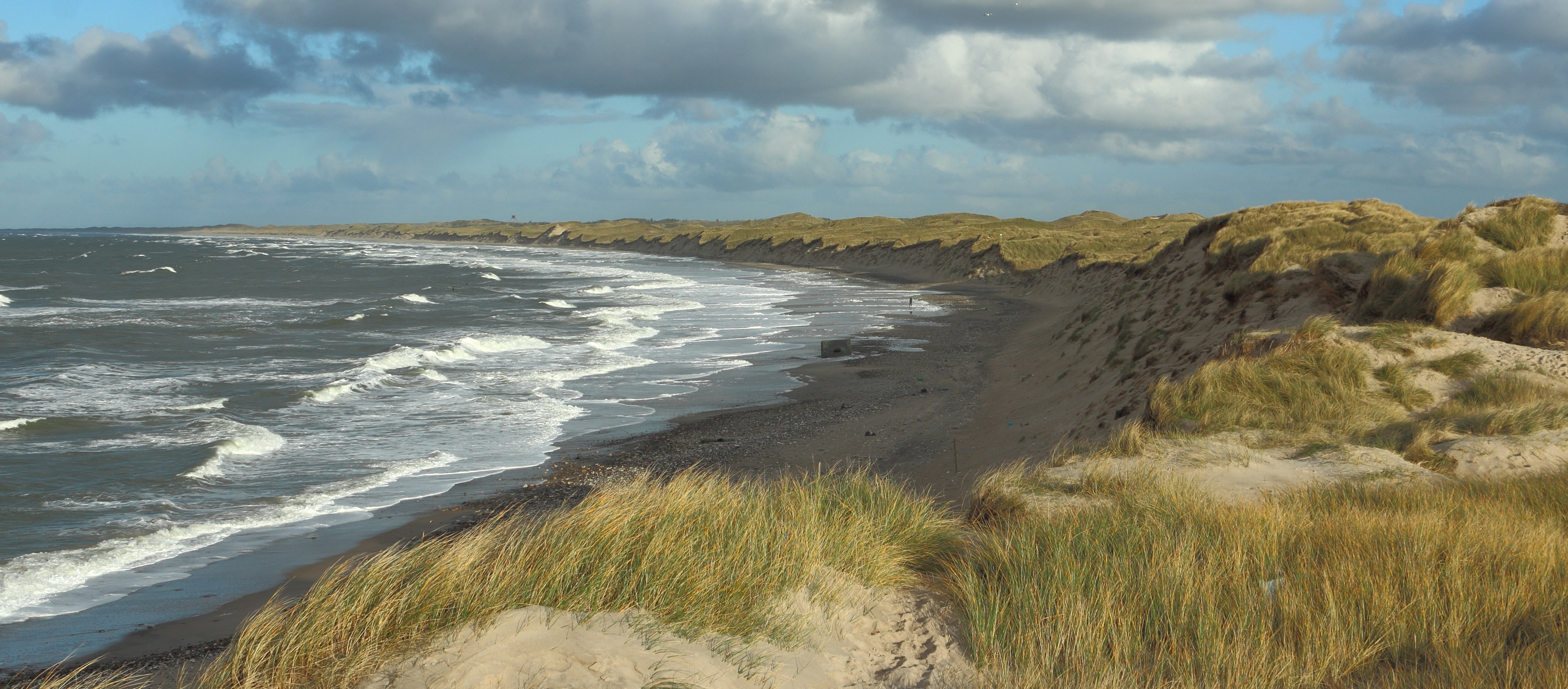
Coastal environment

Bioirrigation is a main component in element cycling. Some of these elements include: Magnesium, Nitrogen, Calcium, Strontium, Molybdenum, and Uranium. Other elements are only displaced at certain steps in the bioirrigation process. Aluminium, Iron, Cobalt, Copper, Zinc, and Cerium are all affected at the start of the process, when the larvae begins to dig into the sediment. While Manganese, Nickel, Arsenic, Cadmium and Caesium were all mobilized slightly after the burrowing process.

== Challenges to Studying Bioirrigation ==
When trying to describe this biologically driven dynamic process, scientists have not been able to develop a 3D image of the process yet.

== New Mechanisms to Study Bioirrigation ==
4D tracing of bioirrigation in marine sediment

There is a hybrid medical imaging technique using a position emission tomography/computed tomography (PET/CT) to measure the ventilation and visualize the pore water advection that is caused by the organisms in 4D imaging.

4D tracing of bioirrigation in marine sediment

== Ecological Importance of Bioirrigation ==
When coastal ecosystems do not have bioirrigating organisms, like lugworms, it results in a lot of sedimentary problems. Some of these problems include clogging of the sediment with organic-rich fine particles and a drastic decrease in sediment permeability. It also makes it so the oxygen cannot penetrate deeply into the sediment and there is accumulation of reduced mineralized products in pore water. These problems disrupt the foundations of a coastal ecosystem.

== Economic Impacts ==
Two organisms that contribute to the bioturbation of soil are Nephtys caeca (Fabricius) and Nereis virens (Sars) annelidae. They dig, bioirrigate, and feed in the sediment and they homogenize the particles found in the sediment when they partake in these activities because of their erratic movements. The bioirrigation generated by these organisms modifies the distribution of dinoflagellate cysts in the sedimentary column. They either bury them or raise them back to the surface, keeping them rotating. One of the most important dinoflagellates that these organisms help distribute is called noxious microalgae and it is responsible for the formation of toxic red tides. These red tides poison mollusks and crustaceans which results in very important economic losses in the fishing industry.

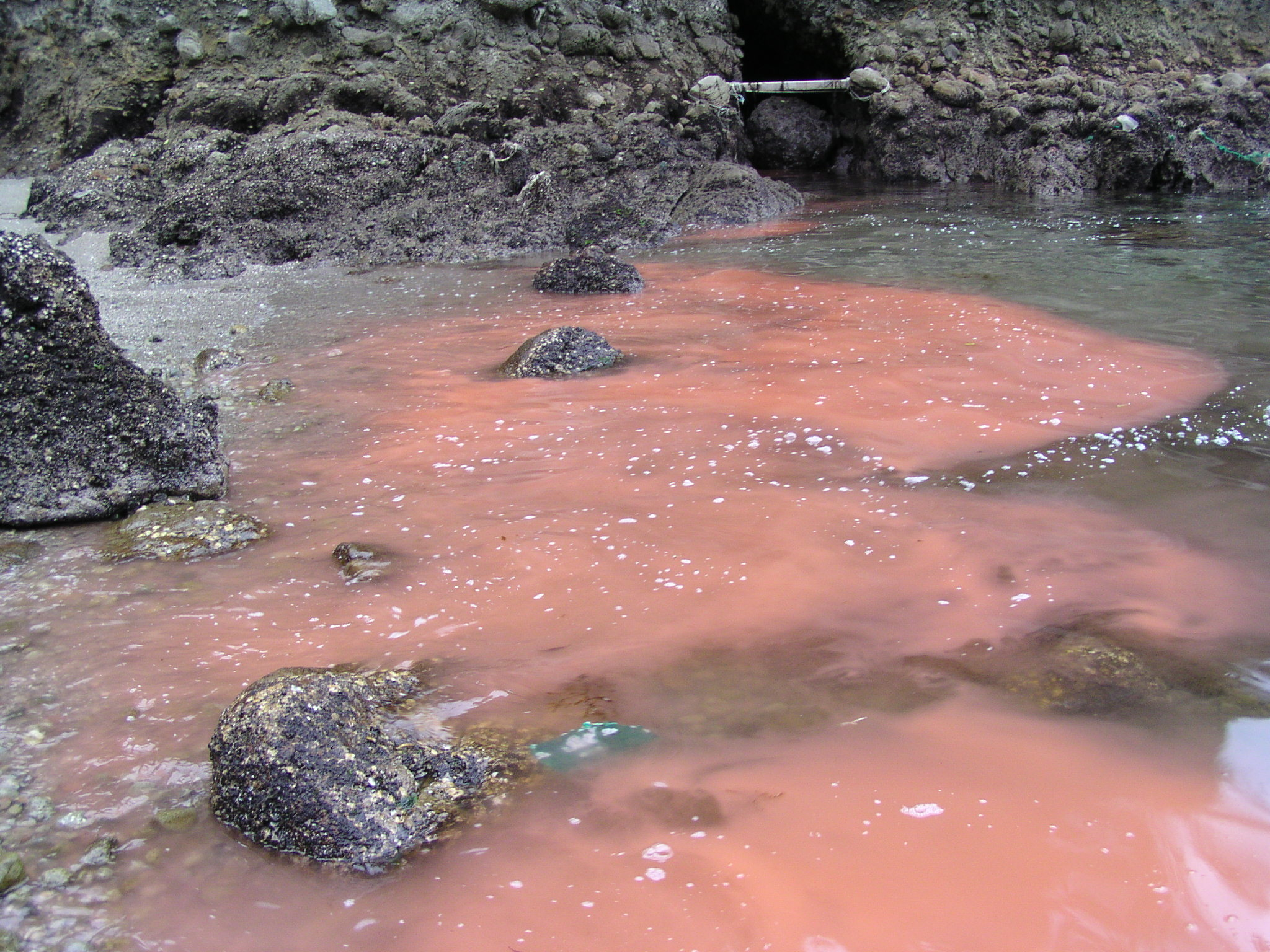
A depiction of the kind of noxious microalgae that would form toxic red tides.

== Case Study: Boston Harbor ==
The sediments of marine environments are important sites of methylmercury (MMHg) production. This production provides important sources of this MMHg to near-shore and off-shore water columns and food webs. Scientists have measured the flux in production across 4 different stations in the Boston Harbor which had different bioirrigation site densities. There is a strong linear relationship between the amount of MMHg exchange and the infaunal burrow density. In the Boston Harbor, it was shown that bioirrigation stimulates the production of methylmercury and water column flux.
