= Argillipedoturbation =

Soil mixing process

Argillipedoturbation, sometimes referred to as self-mulching, is a process of soil mixing caused by the shrinking and swelling of the smectite clays contained in soil. It is an effect specific to soils of the vertisolic variety, and is triggered by the constant cycles of wetting and drying. It is characterized by wide (up to 2 centimetres (0.79 in)), deep (50 centimetres (20 in) or more) vertical cracks in the solum that contain differing materials from the rest of the soil layer they are found in, as well as sloughed-in surface materials. In order for argillipedoturbation to occur, the soil must be at least 30% clay content. The expression of argillipedoturbation depends to a large degree on the exact clay content of the soil, as well as on what other minerals make up the soil composition.

Argillipedoturbation can be strong enough that it can affect the soil horizons by combining the different horizons, making them difficult to distinguish. It can also result in a gently-rolling surface referred to as gilgai topography and in the dramatic soil inclusions known as slickensides. In addition, argillipedoturbation sometimes results in a chernozemic-like A-type horizon, or one resembling a gleysolic order soil. This process can also affect the distribution of rock fragments, by moving fragments at the surface to lower soil layers and vice versa.

The effects of this process are useful in agriculture, as the organic surface materials fertilize the soil and cause them to become very productive when irrigated. However, they are very difficult to plow and manage due to the high, thoroughly mixed clay content.
