= Ichnos (journal) =

Scientific journal

- Discipline: Ichnology
- Language: English
- Edited by: Murray K. Gingras; Luis Alberto Buatois

Publication details
- History: 1990–present
- Publisher: Taylor & Francis
- Impact factor: 2.0 (2024)

Standard abbreviations
- ISO 4: Ichnos

Indexing
- ISSN: 1042-0940 (print); 1563-5236 (web)

Links
- Journal homepage

Ichnos: An International Journal for Plant and Animal Traces is a peer-reviewed scientific journal covering ichnology, a subfield of paleontology. It deals with research on plant and animal traces; tracemaking organism ethology/ecology, biogenic processes, sediment dynamics/diagenesis, stratigraphy and biogeochemistry. It is published by Taylor & Francis.

== Indexing ==
- Scopus
