= Vertisol =

Clay-rich soil, prone to cracking

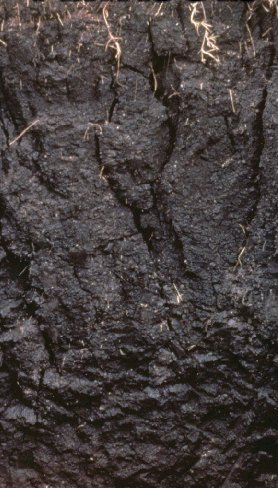
- A vertisol profile
- Used in: WRB, USDA soil taxonomy
- WRB code: VR
- Profile: OAC
- Key process: clay pedoturbation
- Climate: tropical savanna, semi-arid, humid subtropical, Mediterranean

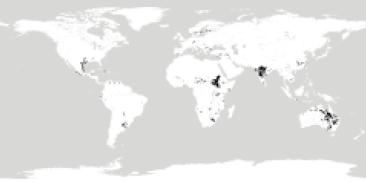
Vertisols of the world

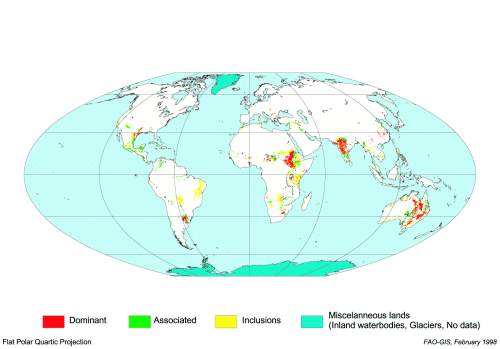
A more detailed map of the global distribution of Vertisols

A vertisol is a Soil Order in the USDA soil taxonomy and a Reference Soil Group in the World Reference Base for Soil Resources (WRB). It is also defined in many other soil classification systems. In the Australian Soil Classification it is called vertosol. The natural vegetation of vertisols is grassland, savanna, or grassy woodland. The heavy texture and unstable behaviour of the soil makes it difficult for many tree species to grow, and forest is uncommon.

== Composition ==
Vertisols have a high content of expansive clay minerals (many of them belonging to the montmorillonites) that form deep cracks in drier seasons or years. In a phenomenon known as argillipedoturbation, alternate shrinking and swelling causes self-ploughing, where the soil material consistently mixes itself, causing some vertisols to have an extremely deep A horizon and no B horizon. (A soil with no B horizon is called an A/C soil). This heaving of the underlying material to the surface often creates a microrelief known as gilgai.

Vertisols typically form from highly basic rocks, such as basalt, in climates that are seasonally humid or subject to erratic droughts and floods, or that impeded drainage. Depending on the parent material and the climate, they can range from grey or red to the more familiar deep black (known as "black earths" in Australia, "black gumbo" in East Texas, "black cotton" soils in East Africa, and "turf soil" or "vlei soils" in South Africa).

== Occurrence ==
Vertisols are found between 50°N and 45°S of the equator. Major areas where vertisols are dominant are eastern Australia (especially inland Queensland and New South Wales), the Deccan Plateau of India, and parts of southern Sudan, Ethiopia, Kenya, Chad (the Gezira), South Africa, and the lower Paraná River in South America. Other areas where vertisols are dominant include southern Texas and adjacent Mexico, central India, northeast Nigeria, Thrace, New Caledonia and parts of eastern China.

== Utilization ==
When irrigation is available, crops such as cotton, wheat, sorghum and rice can be grown. Vertisols are especially suitable for rice because they are almost impermeable when saturated. Rainfed farming is very difficult because vertisols can be worked only under a very narrow range of moisture conditions: they are very hard when dry and very sticky when wet. However, in Australia, vertisols are highly regarded, because they are among the few soils that are not acutely deficient in available phosphorus. Some, known as "crusty vertisols", have a thin, hard crust when dry that can persist for two to three years before they have crumbled enough to permit seeding.

The shrinking and swelling of vertisols can damage buildings and roads, leading to extensive subsidence. Vertisols are generally used for grazing of cattle or sheep. It is not unknown for livestock to be injured through falling into cracks in dry periods. Conversely, many wild and domestic ungulates do not like to move on this soil when inundated. However, the shrink-swell activity allows rapid recovery from compaction.

== Classification ==
In the USDA soil taxonomy, vertisols are subdivided into:

- Aquerts: Vertisols which are subdued aquic conditions for some time in most years and show redoximorphic features are grouped as Aquerts. The permeability is slowed because of the high clay content, and aquic conditions are likely to occur. When precipitation exceeds evapotranspiration, ponding may occur. Under wet soil moisture conditions, iron and manganese are mobilized and reduced. Manganese may partly be responsible for the dark color of the soil profile.
- Cryerts: They have a cryic soil temperature regime. Cryerts are most extensive in the grassland and forest-grassland transitions zones of the Canadian Prairies and at similar latitudes in Russia.
- Xererts: These have a thermic, mesic, or frigid soil temperature regime. They show cracks open for at least 60 consecutive days during the summer, but closed for at least 60 consecutive days during the winter. Xererts are most extensive in the eastern Mediterranean and parts of California.
- Torrerts: They have cracks closed for less than 60 consecutive days when the soil temperature at 50 cm is above 8 °C. These soils are not extensive in the U.S., and occur mostly in west Texas, New Mexico, Arizona, and South Dakota, but are the most extensive suborder of vertisols in Australia.
- Usterts: They have cracks open for at least 90 cumulative days per year. Globally, this suborder is the most extensive of the vertisols order, encompassing the vertisols of the tropics and monsoonal climates in Australia, India, and Africa. In the U.S. the Usterts are common in Texas, Montana, Hawaii, and California.
- Uderts: They have cracks open less than 90 cumulative days per year and less than 60 consecutive days during the summer. In some areas, cracks open only in drought years. Uderts are of small extent globally, being most abundant in Uruguay and eastern Argentina, but also found in parts of Queensland and the "Black Belt" of Mississippi and Alabama.

The WRB defines the diagnostic vertic horizon. It is usually a subsoil horizon and has at least 30% clay, shrink-swell cracks and wedge-shaped aggregates and/or slickensides.

== See also ==
- Pedogenesis
- Pedology (soil study)
- Soil classification
