= Soil regeneration =

Creation of new soil and rejuvenation of soil health

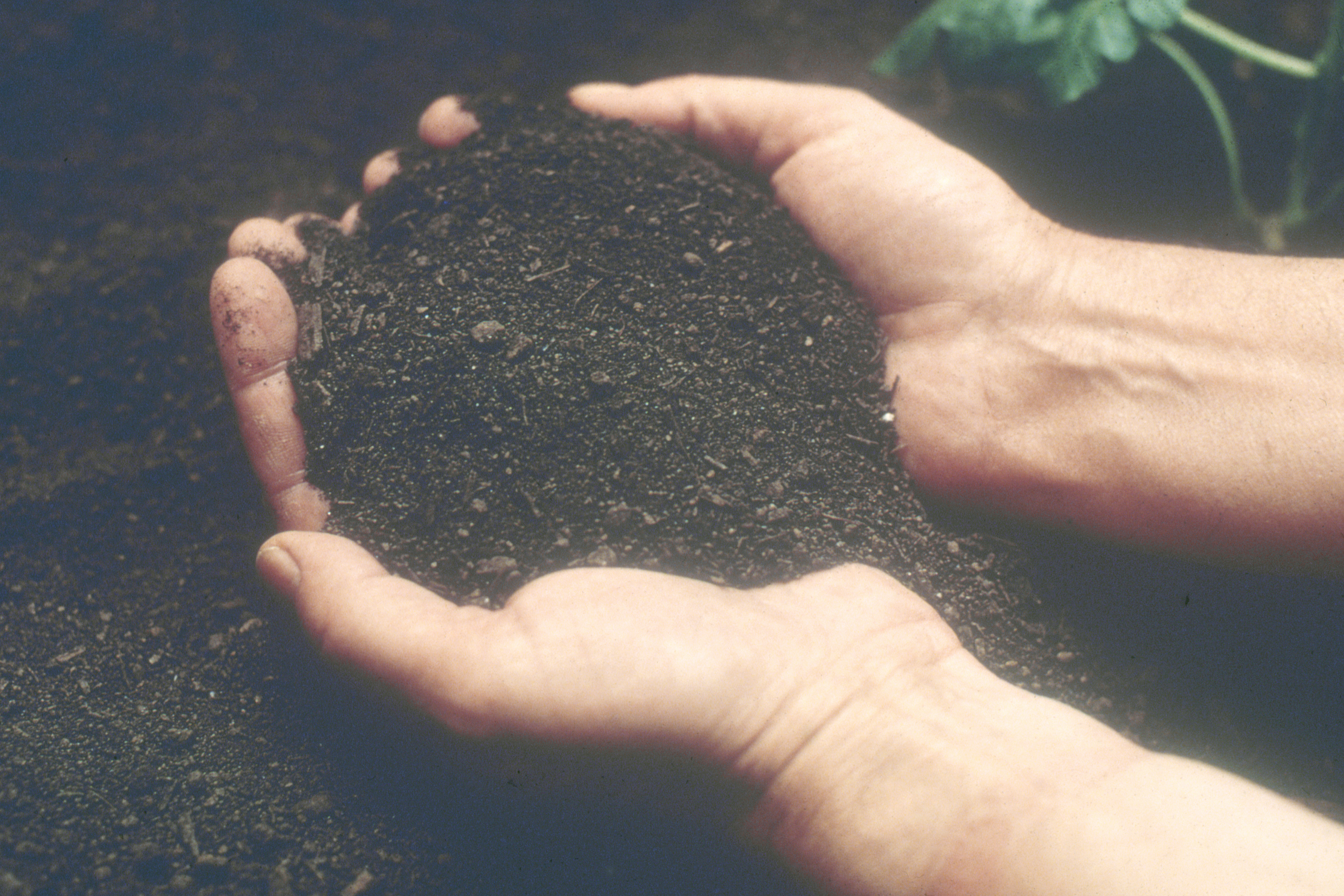
Soil

Soil regeneration, as a particular form of ecological regeneration within the field of restoration ecology, is creating new soil and rejuvenating soil health by: minimizing the loss of topsoil, retaining more carbon than is depleted, boosting biodiversity, and maintaining proper water and nutrient cycling. This has many benefits, such as: soil sequestration of carbon in response to a growing threat of climate change, a reduced risk of soil erosion, and increased overall soil resilience.

== Soil basics ==
=== Soil quality ===
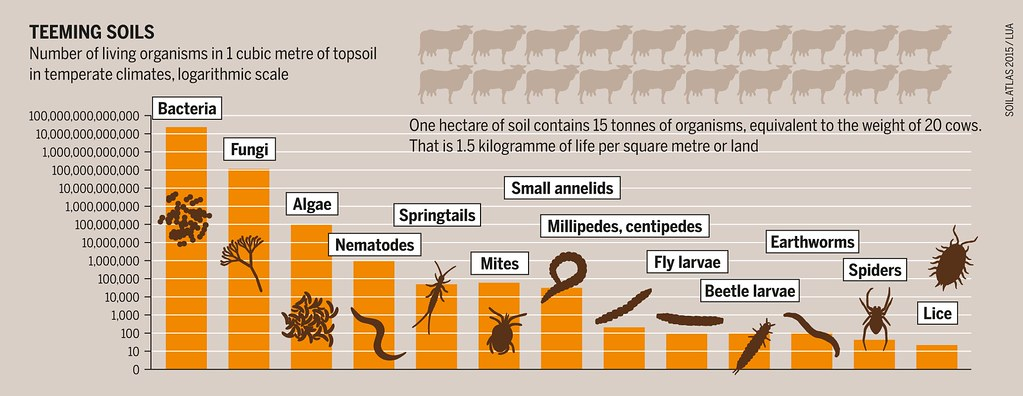
Topsoil organisms bar graph

Soil quality means the ability of the soil to "perform its functions." Healthy soil is a mixture of living organisms, organic matter, and inorganic material. Soil should have texture so that air and water can diffuse through the void spaces in the soil. Air and water typically make up half of the volume of healthy soil. Air and water flow are important for keeping microorganisms and root systems alive, transporting nutrients, and wearing down inorganic components.

Soil is integral to a variety of ecosystem services. These services include food, animal feed, fiber production, climate moderation, waste disposal, water filtration, elemental cycling, and much more. Soil is composed of organic matter (decomposing plants, animals, and microbes), biomass (living plants, animals, and microbes), water, air, minerals (sand, silt, and clay), and nutrients (nitrogen, potassium, and phosphorus). For optimal plant growth, a proper carbon to nitrogen ratio of 20–30:1 must be maintained.

Plants have a particularly symbiotic relationship with microbes in the rhizosphere of the soil. The rhizosphere is an "area of concentrated microbial activity close to the root" and where water and nutrients are readily available. Plants exchange carbohydrates for nutrients excreted by the microbes, different carbohydrates support different microbes. This symbiotic relationship maintains living biomass, primarily fungal, in soils which increases the carbon content of the soil.

Healthy soils are sites of decomposition of dead biomass. Macro- and micro-organisms assist with processes such as decomposition, nutrient cycling, disease suppression, and moderating CO_{2} in the atmosphere. Dead plants and other organic matter also feed the variety of organisms in the soil. Organisms like earthworms and termites break down large pieces of organic matter and contribute to soil texture by digging open spaces within the soil. Biodiversity in soils creates competitive pressure that reduces the available niche for disease and parasitic organisms.

=== Soil degradation ===
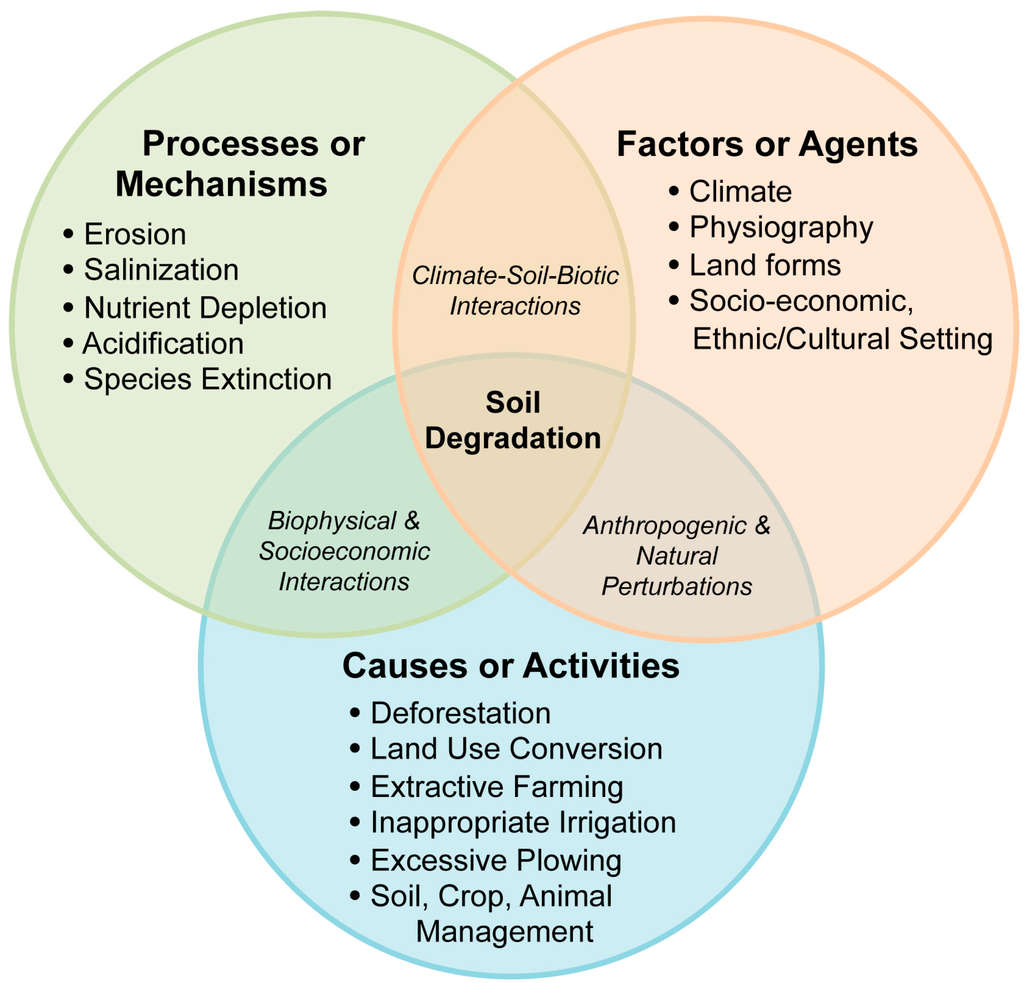
Soil degradation attributing factors, causes, and effects

Soil degradation is a decline in soil condition caused by poor management practices. Soil degradation depletes fertility and reduces the ability of soil to host microbial, plant, and fungal life. One third of the globe's land has degraded soil, especially the tropics and subtropics with around 500 million hectares degraded. Soils can be degraded in four general ways:

- Erosion - soil is displaced as the result of water run-off of wind. Typically this occurs when agricultural fields are left bare.
- Physical - the structure of the soil is changed in a way that inhibits the flow of water and air into the soil. Compaction by large vehicles is typical form of physical degradation.
- Chemical - the soil becomes contaminated with pollutants such as heavy metals or hydrocarbons.
- Biological - the loss of biological activity in the soil typically as a result of eutrophication, where the accumulation of fertilizer inhibits microorganisms that fix nitrogen.

Many agricultural practices can cause soil degradation. Excessive or unnecessary tillage, particularly ploughing, is a common cause of degradation. The upturning of soils makes them vulnerable to wind erosion. The use of farm vehicles on soils can also cause soil compaction decreasing the permeability of soils to air and water. The biological activity of soil can also be degraded by agricultural practices. Overgrazing results in the loss of plant roots in soils, which reduced both organic content in soils and inhibits the natural symbiosis between plants and the soil microbiome. The use of chemical fertilizer inhibits nitrogen fixing fungi and bacteria in the rhizosphere and increase activity of nitrogen oxidizing microbes, leading to an increase of nitrous oxide emissions from soil. The effects of agricultural soil degradation can create a positive feedback loop. For instance, the decrease of soil fertility as a result of mechanical degradation can be compensated with the use of chemical fertilizers, which decrease the rhizospehere's capacity to produce ammonia, which requires more fertilizer applications.

Urbanization can also cause soil degradation. The construction of urban environments frequently involves the compaction of soil and the sealing of soils under layers of concrete, asphalt, and other materials. Sealing materials also decrease the natural absorption of rain water by soil causing intensification of water run-off during storms. The increased flow of water causes soil erosion. Cities also concentrate pollutants that can leach into soils. The maintenance of aesthetic monocultures such as grass lawns can also have deleterious effects on soils. Biodiversity is lost in the rhizosphere as a result of monoculture. Practices such as frequent mowing also inhibit the development of deep root networks and the use of fertilizers and pesticides result in further biological degradation.

Acidification, salinization, nutrient leaching, and toxin contamination are a few types of chemical degradation. Toxins can accumulate in the soil from industrial processes like mining and waste management. Some biological examples include biodiversity loss, emitting greenhouse gasses, reduced carbon content, and a reduced capacity to sequester carbon. One of the most predictable ways to determine whether soil degradation has occurred is to measure its organic carbon content The soil organic carbon pool is extremely important for soil fertility.

== Climate change and the carbon cycle ==
There is a significant connection between the carbon cycle and climate change. In the natural carbon cycle, 61 billion tonnes of carbon is released annually from soils through decomposition and oxidation of soil organic carbon. A similar amount of carbon is deposited into soils through the decomposition of biomass and through symbiosis between plants and the soil microbiome. The top two meters of soil contain an estimated 3,012 billion tonnes of carbon. This is more than the total carbon stored in the atmosphere and in vegetation, 879 billion tonnes and 600 billion tonnes respectively. Since humans began practising agriculture, it is estimated that 133 billion tonnes of carbon has been depleted from soil. The majority of this carbon loss has occurred in the last two centuries with the introduction of mechanised agriculture. The reduction of emissions from soil reduces overall emissions of greenhouse gases and regenerative practices can be used as a form of natural carbon dioxide removal.

Most greenhouse gases are primarily composed of carbon and they produce an effect where warmer air that is heated by the sun is kept from leaving the atmosphere by forming a barrier in the troposphere. According to the Intergovernmental Panel on Climate Change, greenhouse gasses produced by human activity are the most significant cause of global climate change since the 1950s. Without human interaction, carbon is removed from and reintroduced to soil through a variety of ecosystem processes known as the carbon cycle. Humans have been significantly influencing the global carbon cycle since the Industrial Revolution through various means, such as transportation and agriculture. Through these actions, most of this carbon has moved in one direction, from the lithosphere and biospheres to the atmosphere. By means of fossil fuels and intensive farming, much of the natural carbon in the Earth's pedosphere has been released into the atmosphere, contributing to greenhouse gasses.

== Regenerative practices ==
There are many ways to regenerate soil and improve soil quality, such as land management by conservation agriculture. Agriculture is one of the main factors in the depletion of soil richness. As one historical review put it, "Accelerated soil erosion has plagued the earth since the dawn of settled agriculture, and has been a major issue in the rise and fall of early civilization." Certain agricultural practices can deplete the soil of carbon, such as monoculture, where only one type of crop is harvested in a field season after season. This depletes nutrients from the soil because each type of plant has a specific set of nutrients that it requires to grow or that it can fix back into the soil. With a lack of plant diversity, only certain nutrients will be absorbed. Over time, these nutrients will be depleted from the soil. Agroecology is an overarching category of approaches to creating a more sustainable agricultural system and increasing soil health. These conservation agricultural practices utilize many techniques and resources to maintain healthy soil. Some examples are cover cropping, crop rotation, reducing soil disturbance, retaining mulch, and integrated nutrient management. These practices have many benefits, including increased carbon sequestration and reducing the use of fossil fuels.

Permaculture (from "permanent" and "agriculture") is a type of conservation agriculture that seeks to mimic natural ecosystems and minimize human involvement for maintenance. Permaculture practices use mixed crops to balance nutrient flux in the soil, attempt to use native vegetation as much as possible, and use perennial crops where suitable. Permaculture practices also avoid tilling and soil disturbance. These approaches improve soil health over time by reducing soil disturbance and allowing for more sustained interactions between the soil microbiome and plant roots.

Holistic management stems from the work of Allan Savory, who observes that planned grazing can improve soil health and reverse the effects of desertification by increasing biomass. Researchers dispute the desertification claim.

There are also many kinds of soil amendments, both organic and inorganic. They promote soil quality in a variety of ways, such as sequestering toxins, balancing the pH of the soil, adding nutrients, and promoting the activity of organisms. The current conditions of the soil will determine which type of amendment and how much to use. Inorganic amendments are generally used for things like improving the texture and structure of the soil, balancing the pH, and limiting the bioavailability of heavy metal toxins. There are two types of inorganic amendments: alkaline and mineral. Some examples of inorganic amendments include wood ash, ground limestone, and red mud. Mineral amendments include gypsum and dredged materials. Organic amendments improve biological activity, water permeability, and soil structure. Mulch, for example, reduces erosion and helps to maintain the temperature of the soil. Compost is rich in organic matter, it is composed of decomposed matter such as food, vegetation, and animal wastes. Adding compost increases the moisture and nutrient content of the soil and promotes biological activity. Creating compost requires careful management of temperature, the carbon to nitrogen ratio, water, and air. Biochar is an amendment that is full of carbon and is created by pyrolysis, a high-temperature decomposition process. Wastes from animals are common soil amendments, usually their manure. The moisture and nutrient content will vary depending on the animal from which it came. Human wastes can also be used, like the byproduct biosolids from wastewater facilities. Biosolids can be high in nutrient content, so should be used sparingly.

== See also ==
- Carbon cycle
- Climate change
- Environmental soil science
- Land restoration
- Regenerative agriculture
- Soil carbon feedback
