= Soil retrogression and degradation =

Two processes associated with loss of stable soil equilibrium

Soil retrogression and degradation are two regressive evolution processes associated with the loss of equilibrium of a stable soil. Retrogression is primarily due to soil erosion and corresponds to a phenomenon where succession reverts the land to its natural physical state. Degradation or pedolysis is an evolution, different from natural evolution, related to the local climate and vegetation. It is due to the replacement of primary plant communities (known as climax vegetation) by the secondary communities. This replacement modifies the humus composition and amount, and affects the formation of the soil. It is directly related to human activity. Soil degradation may also be viewed as any change or ecological disturbance to the soil perceived to be deleterious or undesirable.

According to the Center for Development Research at the University of Bonn and the International Food Policy Research Institute in Washington, the quality of 33% of pastureland, 25% of arable land and 23% of forests has deteriorated globally over the last 30 years. 3.2 billion people are dependent on this land.

== General ==
At the beginning of soil formation, the bare rock outcrops are gradually colonized by pioneer species (lichens and mosses). They are succeeded by herbaceous vegetation, shrubs, and finally forest. In parallel, the first humus-bearing horizon is formed (the A horizon), followed by some mineral horizons (B horizons). Each successive stage is characterized by a certain association of soil/vegetation and environment, which defines an ecosystem.

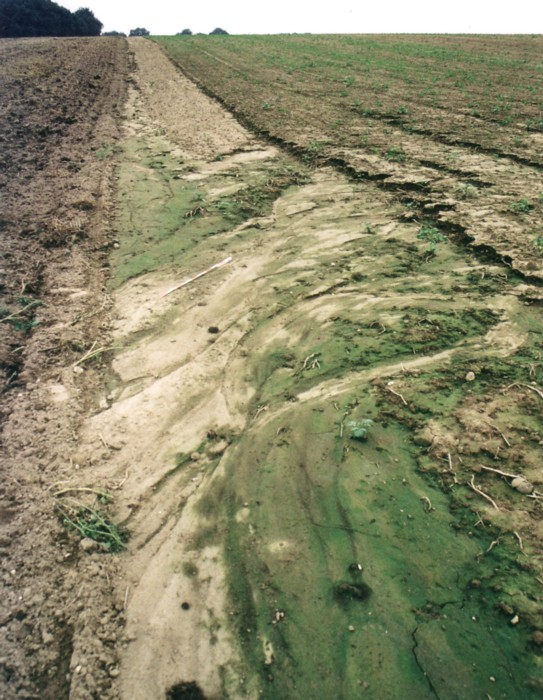
Intensive tillage result on soil degradation

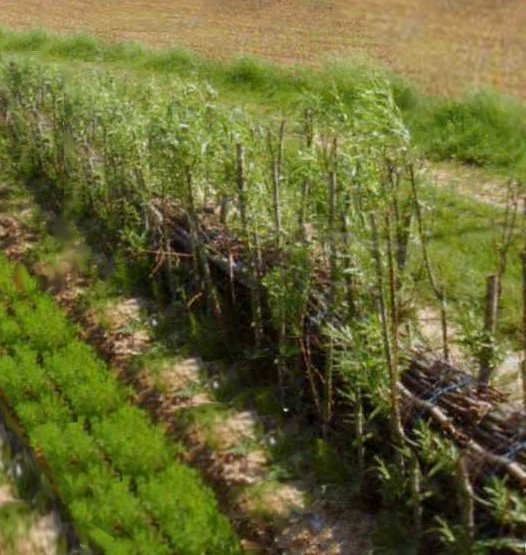
Willow hedge strengthened with fascines for the limitation of runoff, northern France

After a certain time of parallel evolution between the ground and the vegetation, a state of steady balance is reached. This stage of development is called climax by some ecologists and "natural potential" by others. Succession is the evolution towards climax. Regardless of its name, the equilibrium stage of primary succession is the highest natural form of development that the environmental factors are capable of producing.

The cycles of evolution of soils have very variable durations, between tens, hundreds, or thousands of years for quickly evolving soils (A horizon only) to more than a million years for slowly developing soils. The same soil may achieve several successive steady state conditions during its existence, as exhibited by the Pygmy forest sequence in Mendocino County, California. Soils naturally reach a state of high productivity, from which they naturally degrade as mineral nutrients are removed from the soil system. Thus older soils are more vulnerable to the effects of induced retrogression and degradation.

== Ecological factors influencing soil formation ==
There are two types of ecological factors influencing the evolution of a soil (through alteration and humification). These two factors are extremely significant to explain the evolution of soils of short development.

- A first type of factor is the average climate of an area and the vegetation which is associated (biome).
- A second type of factor is more local, and is related to the original rock and local drainage. This type of factor explains appearance of specialized associations (ex peat bogs).

== Biorhexistasy theory ==
The destruction of the vegetation implies the destruction of evoluted soils, or a regressive evolution. Cycles of succession-regression of soils follow one another within short intervals of time (human actions) or long intervals of time (climate variations).

The climate role in the deterioration of the rocks and the formation of soils lead to the formulation of the theory of the biorhexistasy.

- In wet climate, the conditions are favorable to the deterioration of the rocks (mostly chemically), the development of the vegetation and the formation of soils; this period favorable to life is called biostasy.
- In dry climate, the rocks exposed are mostly subjected to mechanical disintegration which produces coarse detrital materials: this is referred to as rhexistasy.

== Perturbations of the balance of a soil ==
When the state of balance, characterized by the ecosystem climax is reached, it tends to be maintained stable in the course of time. The vegetation installed on the ground provides the humus and ensures the ascending circulation of the matters. It protects the ground from erosion by playing the role of barrier (for example, protection from water and wind). Plants can also reduce erosion by binding the particles of the ground to their roots.

A disturbance of climax will cause retrogression, but often, secondary succession will start to guide the evolution of the system after that disturbance. Secondary succession is much faster than primary because the soil is already formed, although deteriorated and needing restoration as well.

However, when a significant destruction of the vegetation takes place (of natural origin such as an avalanche or human origin), the disturbance undergone by the ecosystem is too important. In this latter case, erosion is responsible for the destruction of the upper horizons of the ground, and is at the origin of a phenomenon of reversion to pioneer conditions. The phenomenon is called retrogression and can be partial or total (in this case, nothing remains beside bare rock). For example, the clearing of an inclined ground, subjected to violent rains, can lead to the complete destruction of the soil. Man can deeply modify the evolution of the soils by direct and brutal action, such as clearing, abusive cuts, forest pasture, litters raking. The climax vegetation is gradually replaced and the soil modified (example: replacement of leafy tree forests by moors or pines plantations). Retrogression is often related to very old human practices.

== Influence of human activity ==
Soil erosion is the main factor for soil degradation and is due to several mechanisms: water erosion, wind erosion, chemical degradation and physical degradation.

Erosion can be influenced by human activity. For example, roads which increase impermeable surfaces lead to streaming and ground loss. Improper agriculture practices can also accelerate soil erosion, including by way of:

- Overgrazing of animals
- Monoculture planting
- Row cropping
- Tilling or plowing
- Crop removal
- Land-use conversion

== Consequences of soil regression and degradation ==
Here are a few of the consequences of soil regression and degradation:

- Yields impact: Recent increases in the human population have placed a great strain on the world's soil systems. More than 6 billion people are now using about 39% of the land area of the Earth to raise crops and livestock. Many soils suffer from various types of degradation, that can ultimately reduce their ability to produce food resources. This reduces the food security, which many countries facing soil degradation already do not have. Slight degradation refers to land where yield potential has been reduced by 10%, moderate degradation refers to a yield decrease of 10–50%. Severely degraded soils have lost more than 50% of their potential. Most severely degraded soils are located in developing countries. In Africa, yield reduction is 2–40%, with an average loss of 8.2% of the continent.
- Natural disasters: natural disasters such as mud flows, floods are responsible for the death of many living beings each year. This causes a cycle as floods can degrade soil, and soil degradation can cause floods.
- Deterioration of the water quality: the increase in the turbidity of water and the contribution of nitrogen and of phosphorus can result in eutrophication. Soils particles in surface waters are also accompanied by agricultural inputs and by some pollutants of industrial, urban and road origin (such as heavy metals). The run-off with pesticides and fertilizers make water quality dangerous. The ecological impact of agricultural inputs (such as weed killer) is known but difficult to evaluate because of the multiplicity of the products and their broad spectrum of action.
- Biological diversity: soil degradation may involve perturbation of microbial communities, disappearance of the climax vegetation and decrease in animal habitat, thus leading to a biodiversity loss and animal extinction.
- Economic loss: the estimated costs for land degradation are US$44 billion per year. Globally, the annual loss of 76 billion tons of soil costs the world about US$400 billion per year. In Canada, on-farm effects of land degradation were estimated to range from US$700 to US$915 million in 1984. The economic impact of land degradation is extremely severe in densely populated South Asia, and sub-Saharan Africa.

== Soil enhancement, rebuilding, and regeneration ==
Problems of soil erosion can be fought, and certain practices can lead to soil enhancement and rebuilding. Even though simple, methods for reducing erosion are often not chosen because these practices outweigh the short-term benefits. Rebuilding is especially possible through the improvement of soil structure, addition of organic matter and limitation of runoff. However, these techniques will never totally succeed to restore a soil (and the fauna and flora associated to it) that took more than a thousand years to build up. Soil regeneration is the reformation of degraded soil through biological, chemical, and or physical processes.

When productivity declined in the low-clay soils of northern Thailand, farmers initially responded by adding organic matter from termite mounds, but this was unsustainable in the long-term. Scientists experimented with adding bentonite, one of the smectite family of clays, to the soil. In field trials, conducted by scientists from the International Water Management Institute (IWMI) in cooperation with Khon Kaen University and local farmers, this had the effect of helping retain water and nutrients. Supplementing the farmer's usual practice with a single application of 200 kg bentonite per rai (6.26 rai = 1 hectare) resulted in an average yield increase of 73%. More work showed that applying bentonite to degraded sandy soils reduced the risk of crop failure during drought years.

In 2008, three years after the initial trials, IWMI scientists conducted a survey among 250 farmers in northeast Thailand, half who had applying bentonite to their fields and half who had not. The average output for those using the clay addition was 18% higher than for non-clay users. Using the clay had enabled some farmers to switch to growing vegetables, which need more fertile soil. This helped to increase their income. The researchers estimated that 200 farmers in northeast Thailand and 400 in Cambodia had adopted the use of clays, and that a further 20,000 farmers were introduced to the new technique.

== See also ==
- Soil § Degradation
- Acid sulfate soil
- Alkaline soil
- Hardpan
- Land degradation
- Environmental impact of irrigation
- Land reclamation
- Land improvement
- Planetary boundaries
- Plant growth
- Soil biodiversity
- Soil nutrient
- Artificialization
