= Soil resilience =

Ability of a soil to resist or recover its healthy state after disturbance

Soil resilience refers to the ability of a soil to resist or recover their healthy state in response to destabilising influences. This is a subset of a notion of environmental resilience. Soil resistance, a related term refers to the ability of soil to resist changes or the extent to which a soil will recover from any cropping or management change. The term is distinct from Soil resilience as resistance is the inherent capacity to withstand disturbance, while resilience is the capacity to recover after disturbance.

== Overview ==
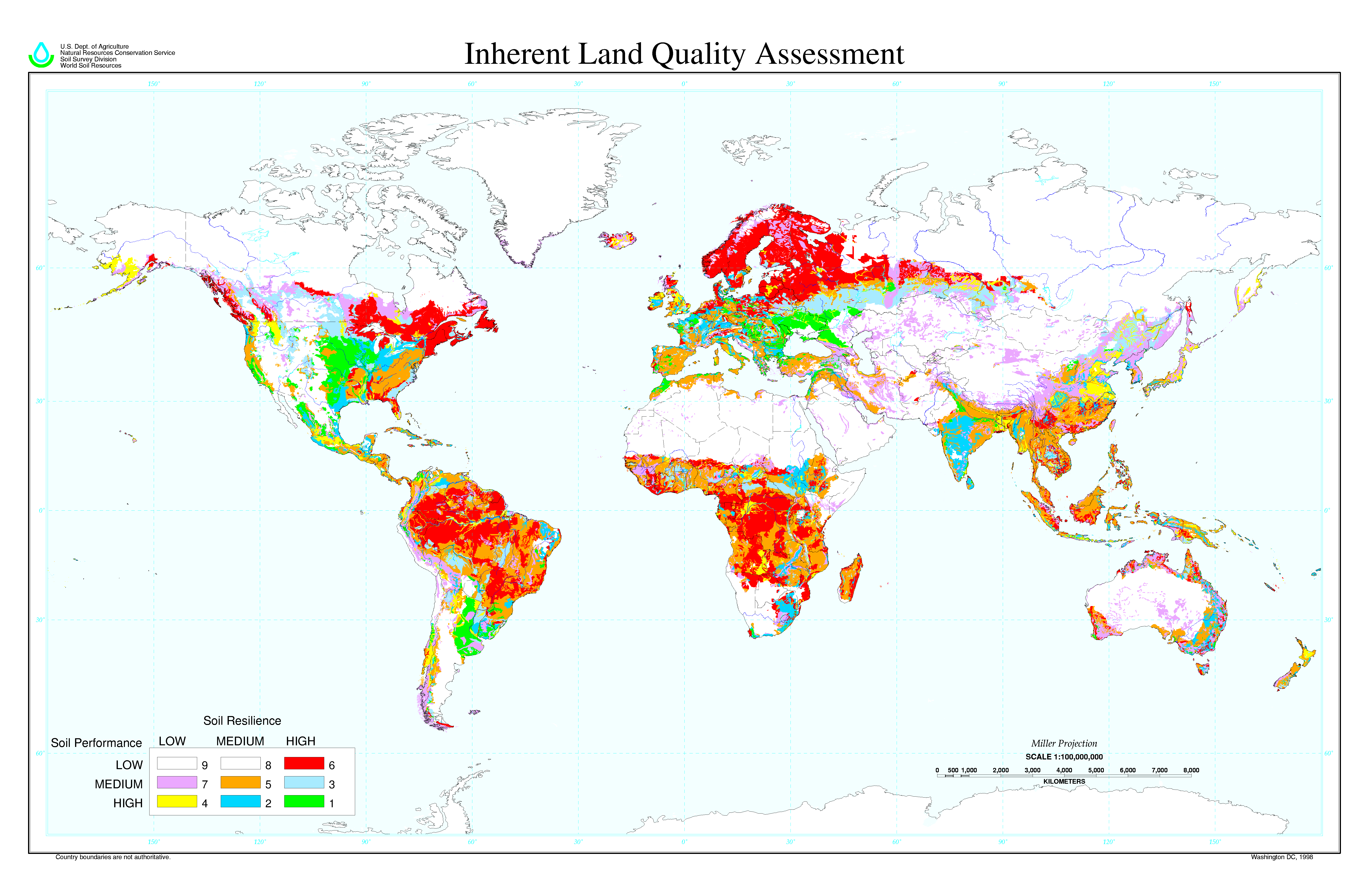
World map of the soil resilience and performance

Soil resilience should first be looked at in terms of soil formation and development (pedogenesis), a continuous process taking thousands of years – this puts into context the short time that humans have so extensively utilised, changed and depended directly on soil. Pedogenesis is the result of five factors: the first two are parent material and topography, which are passive and contribute to soil mass and position; the next two are climate and the biosphere, which are active and supply the energy in soil formation. Finally, there is time.

It is the active factors in soil formation that vary so as to constitute an environmental change or shock. Over time, variations have been significant:

- Over millions of years the soil has endured varying atmospheric conditions including a complete absence of oxygen and associated behaviour of soil elements in a reducing environment, and the establishment of life – particularly of terrestrial vegetation 420 million years ago.
- Over ten thousand years and following the last ice age, though average climate has remained relatively stable, the soil has faced periods of extended wet, dry and fire.

If soil were not resilient, then in the face of past influences it would not be in any condition to support the natural and commercial services that we expect of it currently. So what do we expect of soil resilience?

- Constant or evolving state? – Do we expect that the soil to remain constant – to continue to provide the same environmental and commercial services as at present, or; that it will establish a new equilibrium?
- How long will it take? – How long do we expect soils to ‘hold out’ or adjust, and are we realistic about pedological time?

== Australian context ==
In Australia, the above questions are relevant given the strong dependence on the soil, yet the significant degradation of soils over little more than 200 years due to adoption of European styled agriculture. This is in the context of the real prospect of climate change, cyclical drought and other degrading affects.

It is in the interest of humans to sustain soils as this is the essence of our existence: the maintenance of fertile soil is "one of the most vital ecological services the living world performs"; the "mineral and organic contents of soil must be replenished constantly as plants consume soil elements and pass them up the food chain".

It is claimed by Watson (1992) that the ecosystems of Australia, which have evolved over millennia, have been decimated over the last 200 years. Our expectation has been one of ongoing environmental and commercial service, yet the practices applied have been unsustainable and have led to such soil related problems as salinity, acidity, nutrient decline, erosion and structure decline.

Barrow (1991) claims that despite decades of humans talking of an impending environmental crisis, including the breaking point of our soils' fertility, threats to the environment have continued to grow faster than the willingness to control them. Even with good intentions and best farming practices, still we are caught out by drought and wet periods, which cause unsustainable degradation.

The pressure that we impose on the soil in terms of biosphere (direct human impacts included) and climate constitute environmental change – the rate of this change compared to other changes over pedological time constitutes a shock. The resilience of the soil is limited by the rate and extent of change we impose compared with the time that soil requires to recover.

== See also ==
- Soil conservation – Preservation of soil nutrients
- Soil health – A state of soil, meeting ecosystem functions
- Land degradation – Gradual destruction of land
