= Soil policy in Victoria =

Soil policy in Victoria refers to guidelines and regulations implemented by the state government of Victoria, Australia, to manage and protect the soil resources within its jurisdiction.

== History ==
The soil policy framework in Victoria has evolved over time in response to various challenges and emerging environmental concerns. The state government recognized the importance of soil conservation and sustainable land use practices early on and has continuously refined its policies to address changing needs and knowledge.

== Objectives ==
Soil policies in Victoria cover both agricultural and environmental needs. The key goals include:

1. Soil Conservation: This policy aims to prevent soil erosion, compaction, salinisation, and other forms of degradation through the adoption of appropriate land management practices.
2. Sustainable Land Use: This policy promotes sustainable land use practices that maintain or enhance soil fertility. This can be done through reducing the use of harmful chemicals such pesticides and actively cultivating diverse and resilient ecosystems.
3. Soil Health and Productivity: Enhancing soil health is a crucial aspect of the policy, aiming to maintain soil organic matter levels, promote nutrient cycling, and support the long-term productivity of agricultural and natural systems.
4. Water Quality Protection: The policy recognizes the connection between soil health and water quality and emphasizes measures to prevent soil erosion and nutrient runoff that can degrade water bodies.
5. Research and Education: The soil policy encourages research, education, and extension services to improve understanding of soil management practices and promote their adoption among landholders and stakeholders.

== Implementation ==
=== Monitoring and guidelines ===
The implementation of soil policy in Victoria involves collaboration between the state government, landholders, industry organizations, and other stakeholders. The government provides guidance, technical support, and financial incentives to encourage sustainable soil management practices. Regular soil testing, mapping, and evaluation of soil health indicators are conducted to inform land management decisions and assess the effectiveness of the policy measures.

One example of a comprehensive soil plan is the North Central Victoria Soil Health Action Plan. These guidelines promote sustainable land management practices that help conserve soil quality, prevent soil degradation, and ensure long-term productivity of agricultural and natural ecosystems.

EPA Victoria and local councils are in charge of regulating and managing the contaminated sites across Victoria. EPA can investigate, require clean up, charge polluters with infringement notices and take them to court if they don't comply with the Environment Protection Act 2017.

From 2021 and following the adoption of the Environment Protection Regulations 2021, new obligations regarding the risks of contaminated lands towards the environment and human health are implemented.

- A duty to manage risks of contamination
- A duty to notify EPA Victoria under specific situations.

=== Farm management ===
Agriculture Victoria provides services to fight against land degradations including acidification, erosion and salinity that impacts productivity of farm soils.

== Impact ==
The soil policy in Victoria has led to increased awareness among landholders about the importance of soil health and sustainable practices, resulting in the adoption of erosion control measures, conservation farming techniques, and improved nutrient management.

By promoting sustainable land use and soil management practices, the policy has helped to safeguard agricultural productivity, protect natural ecosystems, and preserve the long-term viability of Victoria's soils.

== Future Directions ==
The government aims to stay abreast of emerging research and technological advancements to enhance the effectiveness of soil conservation efforts and ensure the sustainable use of Victoria's soil resources.

== See also ==
- Environment of Australia
- Environmental law in Victoria
- Soil science
