= Soil biodiversity =

Soil biodiversity refers to the relationship of soil to biodiversity and to aspects of the soil that can be managed in relative to biodiversity. Soil biodiversity relates to some catchment management considerations.

== Biodiversity ==
According to the Australian Department of the Environment and Water Resources, biodiversity is "the variety of life: the different plants, animals and micro-organisms, their genes and the ecosystems of which they are a part." Biodiversity and soil are strongly linked because soil is the medium for a large variety of organisms, and interacts closely with the wider biosphere. Conversely, biological activity is a primary factor in soil's physical and chemical formation.

Soil provides a vital habitat, primarily for microbes (including bacteria and fungi), but also for microfauna (such as protozoa and nematodes), mesofauna (such as microarthropods and enchytraeids), and macrofauna (such as earthworms, termites, and millipedes). The primary role of soil biota is to recycle organic matter that is derived from the "above-ground plant-based food web".

Soil is in close cooperation with the broader biosphere. The maintenance of fertile soil is "one of the most vital ecological services the living world performs", and the "mineral and organic contents of soil must be replenished constantly as plants consume soil elements and pass them up the food chain".

The correlation of soil and biodiversity can be observed spatially. For example, both natural and agricultural vegetation boundaries correspond closely to soil boundaries, even at continental and global scales.

A "subtle synchrony" is how Baskin (1997) describes the relationship between the soil and the diversity of life above and below the ground. It is not surprising that soil management directly affects biodiversity. This includes practices that influence soil volume, structure, biological, and chemical characteristics, and whether soil exhibits adverse effects such as reduced fertility, soil acidification, or salinisation.

== Process effects ==
=== Acidification ===
Global variation in Soil acidity: Acidic Neutral Alkaline No data

Soil acidity (or alkalinity) is the concentration of hydrogen ions (H^{+}) in the soil. Measured on the pH scale, soil acidity is an invisible condition that directly affects soil fertility and toxicity by determining which elements in the soil are available for absorption by plants. Increases in soil acidity are caused by removal of agricultural product from the paddock, leaching of nitrogen as nitrate below the root zone, inappropriate use of nitrogenous fertilizers, and buildup of organic matter. Many of the soils in the Australian state of Victoria are naturally acidic; however, about 30,000 square kilometres or 23% of Victoria's agricultural soils suffer reduced productivity due to increased acidity. Soil acidity has been seen to damage the roots of the plants. Plants in higher acidity have smaller, less durable roots. Some evidence has shown that the acidity damages the tips of the roots, restricting further growth. The height of the plants has also seen a marked restriction when grown in acidic soils, as seen in American and Russian wheat populations. The number of seeds that are even able to germinate in acidic soil is much lower than the number of seeds that can sprout in a more neutral pH soil. These limitations to the growth of plants can have a very negative effect on plant health, leading to a decrease in the overall plant population.

These effects occur regardless of the biome. A study in the Netherlands examined the correlation between soil pH and soil biodiversity in soils with pH below 5. A strong correlation was discovered, wherein the lower the pH the lower the biodiversity. The results were the same in grasslands as well as heathlands. Particularly concerning is the evidence showing that this acidification is directly linked to the decline in endangered species of plants, a trend recognized since 1950.

Soil acidification reduces soil biodiversity. It reduces the numbers of most macrofauna, including, for example, earthworm numbers (important in maintaining structural quality of the topsoil for plant growth). Also affected is rhizobium survival and persistence. Decomposition and nitrogen fixation may be reduced, which affects the survival of native vegetation. Biodiversity may further decline as certain weeds proliferate under declining native vegetation.

In strongly acidic soils, the associated toxicity may lead to decreased plant cover, leaving the soil susceptible to erosion by water and wind. Extremely low pH soils may suffer from structural decline as a result of reduced microorganisms and organic matter; this brings a susceptibility to erosion under high rainfall events, drought, and agricultural disturbance.

Some plants within the same species have shown resistance to the soil acidity their population grows in. Selectively breeding the stronger plants is a way for humans to guard against increasing soil acidity.

Further success in combatting soil acidity has been seen in soybean and maize populations suffering from aluminum toxicity. Soil nutrients were restored and acidity decreased when lime was added to the soil. Plant health and root biomass increased in response to the treatment. This is a possible solution for other acidic soil plant populations

=== Structure decline ===
Soil structure is the arrangement of particles and associated pores in soils across the size range from nanometres to centimeters. Biological influences can be demonstrated in the formation and stabilization of the soil aggregates. Still, it is necessary to distinguish clearly between those forces or agencies that create aggregations of particles and those that stabilize or degrade such aggregations. What qualifies as good soil contains the following attributes: optimal soil strength and aggregate stability, which offer resistance to structural degradation (capping/crusting, slaking and erosion, for example); optimal bulk density, which aids root development and contributes to other soil physical parameters such as water and air movement within the soil; optimal water holding capacity and rate of water infiltration.

Well-developed, healthy soils are complex systems in which physical soil structure is as important as chemical content. Soil pores—maximized in a well-structured soil—allow oxygen and moisture to infiltrate to depths and plant roots to penetrate to obtain moisture and nutrients.

Biological activity helps in the maintenance of relatively open soil structure, as well as facilitating decomposition and the transportation and transformation of soil nutrients. Changing soil structure has been shown to lead to reduced accessibility by plants to necessary substances. It is now uncontested that microbial exudates dominate the aggregation of soil particles and the protection of carbon from further degradation. It has been suggested that microorganisms within the soil "engineer" a superior habitat and provide a more sound soil structure, leading to more productive soil systems.

Traditional agricultural practices have generally caused declining soil structure. For example, cultivation causes the mechanical mixing of the soil, compacting and sheering of aggregates and filling of pore spaces—organic matter is also exposed to a greater rate of decay and oxidation. Soil structure is essential to soil health and fertility; soil structure decline has a direct effect on soil and surface food chain and biodiversity as a consequence. Continued crop cultivation eventually results in significant changes within the soil, such as its nutrient status, pH balance, organic matter content, and physical characteristics. While some of these changes can be beneficial to food and crop production, they can also be harmful towards other necessary systems. For example, studies have shown that tilling has had negative consequences towards soil organic matter (SOM), the organic component of soil composed of plant and animal decomposition and substances synthesized by soil organisms. SOM plays an integral role in preserving soil structure. Still, the constant tilling of crops has caused the SOM to shift and redistribute, causing soil structure to deteriorate and altering soil organism populations (such as with earthworms). Yet in many parts of the world, maximizing food production at all costs due to rampant poverty and the lack of food security tends to leave the long term ecological consequences overlooked, despite research and acknowledgment by the academic community. Crop rotation, crop diversification, legume intercrops, and organic inputs are found to correlate with higher soil diversity by McDaniel et al. 2014 and Lori et al. 2017.

=== Sodicity ===
Soil sodicity refers to the soil's content of sodium compared to its content of other cations, such as calcium. In high levels, sodium ions break apart clay platelets and cause swelling and dispersion in soil. This results in reduced soil sustainability. If the concentration occurs repeatedly, the soil becomes cement-like, with little or no structure.

Extended exposure to high sodium levels results in a decrease in the amount of water retained and able to flow through the soil and a decrease in decomposition rates (this leaves the soil infertile and prohibits any future growth). This issue is prominent in Australia, where 1/3 of the land is affected by high salt levels. It is a natural occurrence, but farming practices such as overgrazing and cultivation have contributed to the rise of it. The options for managing sodic soils are minimal; one must select sodicity-tolerant plants or change the soil. The latter is the more difficult process. If changing the soil, one must add calcium to displace the excess exchangeable sodium that causes the disaggregation that blocks water flow.

=== Salinisation ===
Soil salinity is the salt concentration within the soil profile or on the soil surface. Excessive salt directly affects the composition of plants and animals due to varying salt tolerance – along with various physical and chemical changes to the soil, including structural decline and, in the extreme, denudation, exposure to soil erosion, and export of salts to waterways. At low soil salinity, there is a lot of microbial activity, that results in an increase in soil respiration, which increases the carbon dioxide levels in the soil, producing a healthier environment for plants. As the salinity of the soil rises, there is more stress on microbes because there is less available water available to them, leading to less respiration. Soil salinity has localised and regional effects on biodiversity, ranging, for example, from changes in plant composition and survival at a local discharge site through to regional changes in water quality and aquatic life.

While very saline soil is not preferred for growing crops, many crops can grow in more saline soils than others. This is important in countries where resources such as fresh water are scarce and needed for drinking. Saline water can be used for agriculture. Soil salinity can vary between extremes in a relatively small area; this allows plants to seek areas with less salinity. It is hard to determine which plants can grow in soil with high salinity because the soil salinity is not uniform, even in small areas. However, plants absorb nutrients from areas with lower salinity.

=== Erosion ===
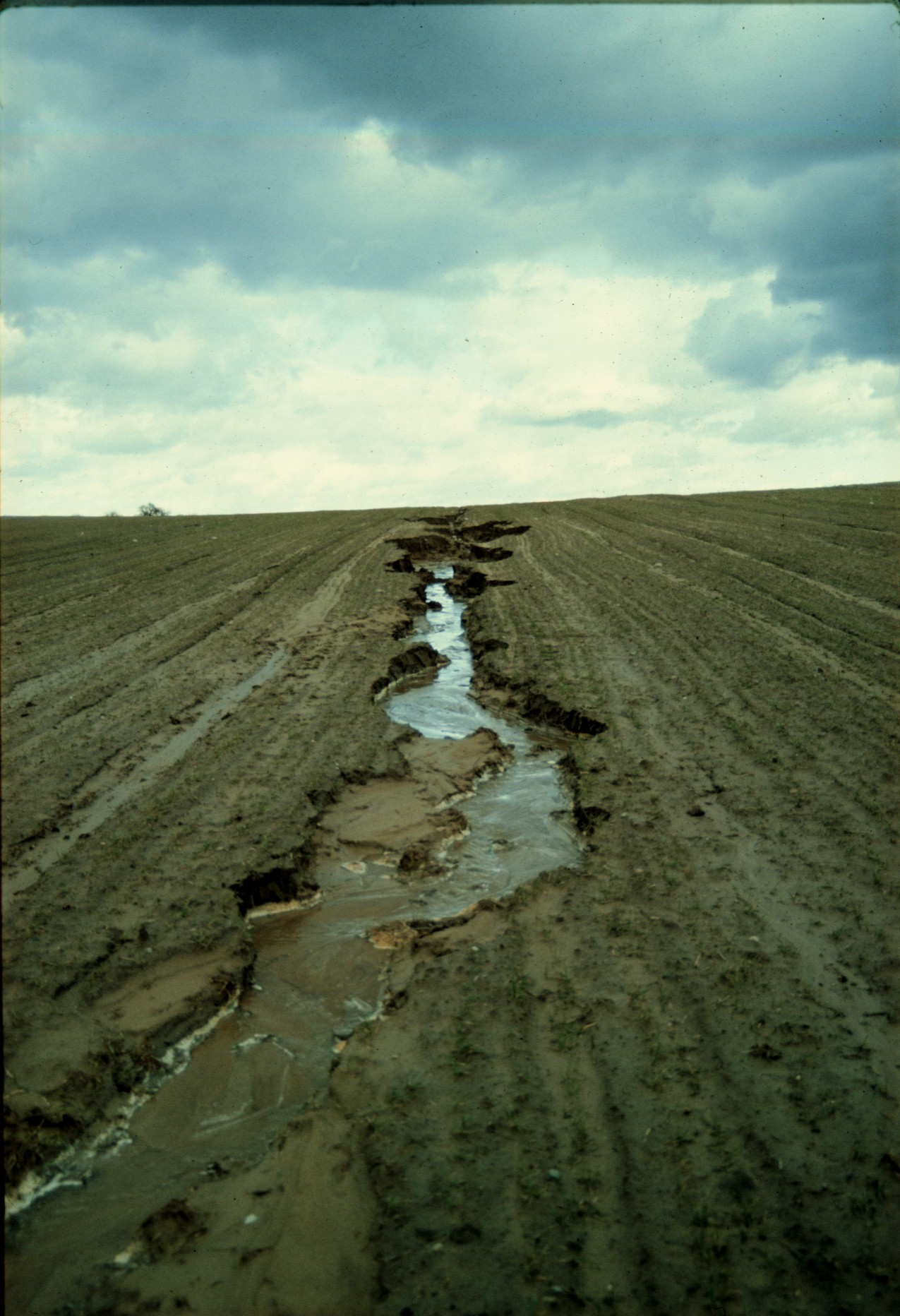
An actively eroding rill on an intensively-farmed field in Germany

Soil erosion is the removal of the soil's upper layers by water, wind, or ice. Soil erosion occurs naturally, but human activities can greatly increase its severity. Soil that is healthy is fertile and productive. But soil erosion leads to a loss of topsoil, organic matter, and nutrients; it breaks down soil structure and decreases water storage capacity, reducing fertility and water availability to plant roots. Soil erosion is, therefore, a major threat to soil biodiversity.

The effects of soil erosion can be lessened by means of various soil conservation techniques. These include changes in agricultural practice (such as moving to less erosion-prone crops), the planting of leguminous nitrogen-fixing trees, or trees that are known to replenish organic matter. Also, jute mats and jute geotextile nets can be used to divert and store runoff and control soil movement.

Misconstrued soil conservation efforts can result in an imbalance of soil chemical compounds. For example, attempts at afforestation in the northern Loess Plateau, China, have led to nutrient deprivation of organic materials such as carbon, nitrogen, and phosphorus.

=== Use of fertilizers ===
Potassium (K) is an essential macronutrient for plant development and potassium chloride (KCl) represents the most widely source of K used in agriculture. The use of KCl leads to high concentrations of chloride (Clˉ) in soil which cause increase in soil salinity affecting the development of plants and soil organisms.

Chloride has a biocidal effect on the soil ecosystem, causing negative effects on the growth, mortality, and reproduction of organisms, which in turn jeopardizes soil biodiversity. The excessive availability of chloride in soil can trigger physiological disorders in plants and microorganisms by decreasing cells' osmotic potential and stimulating the production of reactive oxygen species. In addition, this ion negatively affects nitrifying microorganisms, thus affecting nutrient availability in the soil.

== Catchment scale impacts ==
Biological systems—both natural and artificial—depend heavily on healthy soils; it is the maintenance of soil health and fertility in all of its dimensions that sustain life. The interconnection spans vast spatial and temporal scales; the major degradation issues of salinity and soil erosion, for instance, can have anywhere from local to regional effects – it may take decades for the consequences of management actions affecting soil to be realised in terms of biodiversity impact.

Maintaining soil health is a regional or catchment-scale issue. Because soils are a dispersed asset, the only effective way to ensure soil health generally is to encourage a broad, consistent, and economically appealing approach. Examples of such approaches as applied to an agricultural setting include the application of lime (calcium carbonate) to reduce acidity so as to increase soil health and production and the transition from conventional farming practices that employ cultivation to limited or no-till systems, which has had a positive impact on improving soil structure.

== Monitoring and mapping ==
Soils encompass a huge diversity of organisms, which makes biodiversity difficult to measure. It is estimated that a football pitch contains underground as many organisms as equal to the size of 500 sheep. A first step has been taken in identifying areas where soil biodiversity is most under pressure is to find the main proxies which decrease soil biodiversity. Soil biodiversity will be measured in the future, especially thanks to the development of molecular approaches relying on direct DNA extraction from the soil matrix.

== See also ==
- Soil carbon
- Soil degradation
