= Soil gas =

Gases in the air space between soil components

Soil gases (soil atmosphere) are the gases found in the air space between soil components. The spaces between the solid soil particles, if they do not contain water, are filled with air. The primary soil gases are nitrogen, carbon dioxide and oxygen. Oxygen is critical because it allows for respiration of both plant roots and soil organisms. Other natural soil gases include nitric oxide, nitrous oxide, methane, and ammonia. Some environmental contaminants below ground produce gas which diffuses through the soil such as from landfill wastes, mining activities, and contamination by petroleum hydrocarbons which produce volatile organic compounds. The soil atmosphere is also made of a variety of volatile compounds emitted by soil organisms, as respiratory metabolites, allelopathic compounds or semiochemical signals used in within-species and between-species communication. Soil is a net emitter of greenhouse gases, in particular when and where permafrost is thawing and degassing under the influence of climate warming.

Gases fill soil pores in the soil structure as water drains or is removed from a soil pore by evaporation or root absorption. The network of pores within the soil aerates, or ventilates, the soil. This aeration network becomes blocked when water enters soil pores. Not only are both soil air and soil water very dynamic parts of soil, but both are often inversely related.

== Composition ==
Composition of Air in Soil and Atmosphere
Gas	Soil	Atmosphere
Nitrogen	79.2%	78.0%
Oxygen	20.6%	20.9%
Carbon Dioxide	0.25%	0.04%

The composition of gases present in the soil's pores, referred to commonly as the soil atmosphere or atmosphere of the soil, is similar to that of the Earth's atmosphere. Unlike the atmosphere, however, soil gas composition is less stagnant due to the various chemical and biological processes taking place in the soil. The resulting changes in composition from these processes can be defined by their variation time (i.e. daily vs. seasonal). Despite this spatial- and temporal-dependent fluctuation, soil gases typically boast greater concentrations of carbon dioxide and water vapor in comparison to the atmosphere. Furthermore, concentrations of other gases, such as methane and nitrous oxide, are relatively minor yet significant in determining greenhouse gas flux and anthropogenic impacts on soils.

== Processes ==
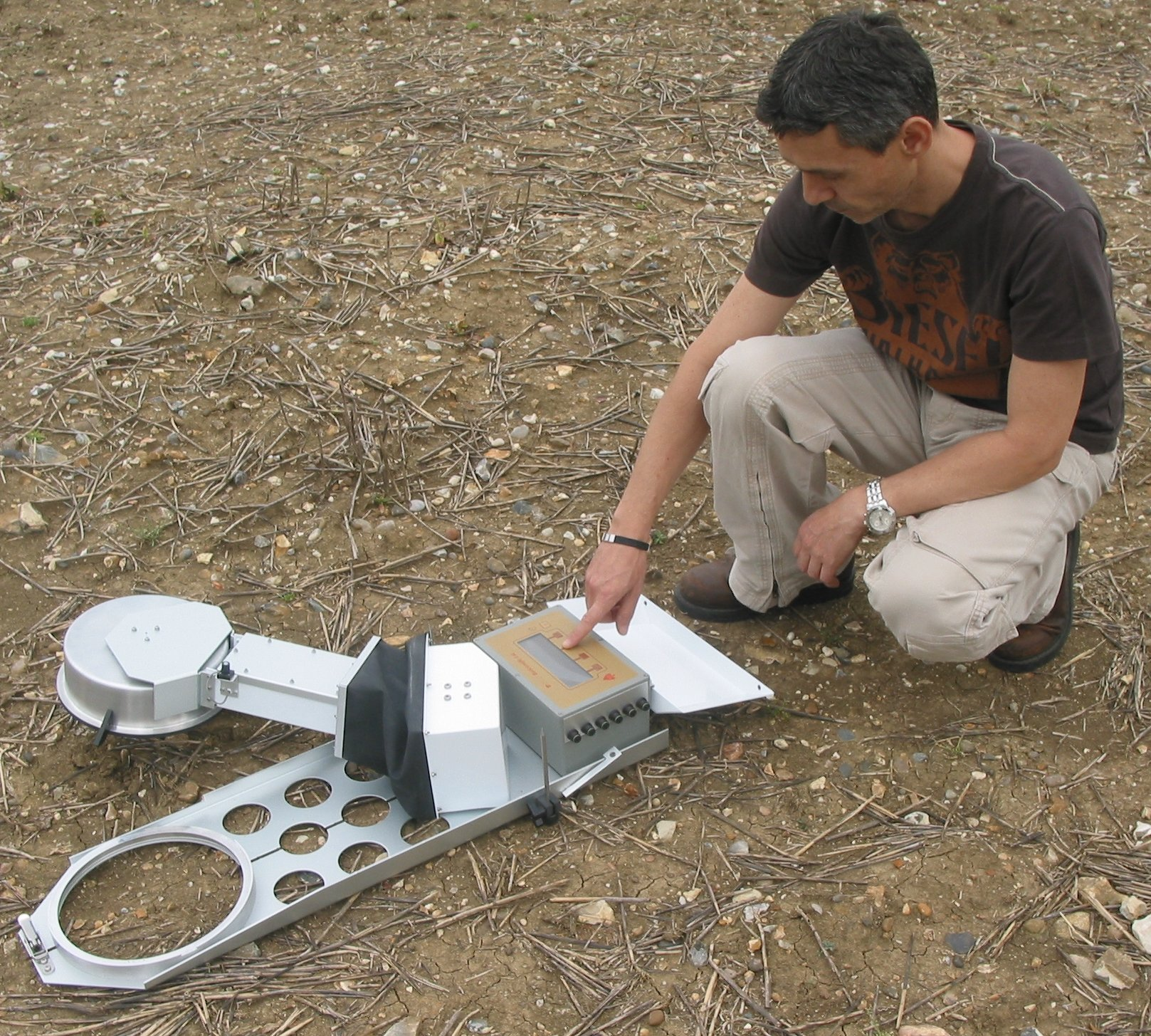
Automated CO_{2} exchange system measuring soil respiration

Gas molecules in soil are in continuous thermal motion according to the kinetic theory of gases, and there is also collision between molecules – a random walk process. In soil, a concentration gradient causes net movement of molecules from high concentration to low concentration, which gives the movement of gas by diffusion. Numerically, it is explained by the Fick's law of diffusion. Soil gas migration, specifically that of hydrocarbon species with one to five carbons, can also be caused by microseepage.

The soil atmosphere's variable composition and constant motion can be attributed to chemical processes such as diffusion, decomposition, and, in some regions of the world, thawing, among other processes. Diffusion of soil air with the atmosphere causes the preferential replacement of soil gases with atmospheric air. More significantly, moreover, variation in soil gas composition due to seasonal, or even daily, temperature and/or moisture change can influence the rate of soil respiration.

According to the USDA, soil respiration refers to the quantity of carbon dioxide released from soil. This excess carbon dioxide is created by the decomposition of organic material by microbial organisms, in the presence of oxygen. Given the importance of both soil gases to soil life, significant fluctuation of carbon dioxide and oxygen can result in changes in rate of decay, while changes in microbial abundance can inversely influence soil gas composition.

In regions of the world where freezing of soils or drought is common, soil thawing and rewetting due to seasonal or meteorological changes influence soil gas flux. Both processes hydrate the soil and increase nutrient availability leading to an increase in microbial activity. This results in greater soil respiration and influences the composition of soil gases.

== Studies and Research ==
Soil gases have been used for multiple scientific studies to explore topics such as microseepage, earthquakes, and gaseous exchange between the soil and the atmosphere. Microseepage refers to the limited release of hydrocarbons on the soil surface and can be used to look for petroleum deposits based on the assumption that hydrocarbons vertically migrate to the soil surface in small quantities. Migration of soil gases, specifically radon, can also be examined as earthquake precursors. Furthermore, for processes such as soil thawing and rewetting, for example, large sudden changes in soil respiration can cause increased flux of soil gases such as carbon dioxide and methane, which are greenhouse gases. These fluxes and interactions between soil gases and atmospheric air can further be analyzed by distance from the soil surface.
