= Soil health =

State of soil, meeting ecosystem functions

Soil health is a state of a soil meeting its range of ecosystem functions as appropriate to its environment. In more colloquial terms, the health of soil arises from favorable interactions of all soil components (living and non-living) that belong together, as in microbiota, plants and animals. It is possible that a soil can be healthy in terms of ecosystem functioning but not necessarily serve crop production or human nutrition directly, hence the scientific debate on terms and measurements.

Soil health testing is pursued as an assessment of this status but tends to be confined largely to agronomic objectives. Soil health depends on soil biodiversity (with a robust soil biota), and it can be improved via soil management, especially by care to keep protective living covers on the soil and by natural (carbon-containing) soil amendments. Inorganic fertilizers do not necessarily damage soil health if they are not used in excess, and if they bring about a general improvement of overall plant growth which contributes more carbon-containing residues to the soil.

== Aspects ==
The term soil health is used to describe the state of a soil in:

- Sustaining plant and animal productivity (agronomic focus);
- Enhancing biodiversity (Soil biodiversity) (ecological focus);
- Maintaining or enhancing water and air quality (environmental/climate focus);
- Supporting human health and habitation.
- sequestering carbon

The phrase "soil health" has largely replaced the older "soil quality". The primary difference between the two expressions is that soil quality was focused on the ability of the soil serve a particular purpose, as in "quality of soil for maize production" or "quality of soil for roadbed preparation" and so on. The word "health" shifted the perception to be an integrative, holistic, and systematic view of the soil's ability to function as a self-sustaining system. The two expressions still overlap considerably. Soil health as an expression derives from organic or "biological farming" movements in Europe, however, well before soil quality was first applied as a discipline around 1990. In 1978, Swiss soil biologist Dr Otto Buess wrote an essay "The Health of Soil and Plants" which largely defines the field even today.

The underlying principle in the use of the term "soil health" is that soil is not just an inert, lifeless growing medium, which modern intensive farming tends to represent, rather it is a living, dynamic and ever-so-subtly changing whole environment. It turns out that soils highly fertile from the point of view of crop productivity are also lively from a biological point of view. It is now commonly recognized that soil microbial biomass is large: in temperate grassland soil the bacterial and fungal biomass have been documented to be 1–2 t (2.0 long tons; 2.2 short tons)/hectare and 2–5 t (4.9 long tons; 5.5 short tons)/ha, respectively. Some microbiologists now believe that 80% of soil nutrient functions are essentially controlled by microbes.

Using the human health analogy, a healthy soil can be categorized as one:

- In a state of composite well-being in terms of biological, chemical and physical properties;
- Not diseased or infirmed (i.e. not degraded, nor degrading), nor causing negative off-site impacts;
- With each of its qualities cooperatively functioning such that the soil reaches its full potential and resists degradation;
- Providing a full range of functions (especially nutrient, carbon and water cycling) and in such a way that it maintains this capacity into the future.

== Conceptualisation ==

Soil health is the condition of the soil in a defined space and at a defined scale relative to a set of benchmarks that encompass healthy functioning. It would not be appropriate to refer to soil health for soil-roadbed preparation, as in the analogy of soil quality in a functional class. The definition of soil health may vary between users of the term as alternative users may place differing priorities upon the multiple functions of a soil. Therefore, the term soil health can only be understood within the context of the user of the term, and their aspirations of a soil, as well as by the boundary definition of the soil at issue. Finally, intrinsic to the discussion on soil health are many potentially conflicting interpretations, especially ecological landscape assessment vs agronomic objectives, each claiming to have soil health criteria.

== Interpretation ==
Different soils will have different benchmarks of health depending on the "inherited" qualities, and on the geographic circumstance of the soil. The generic aspects defining a healthy soil can be considered as follows:

- "Productive" options are broad;
- Life diversity is broad;
- Absorbency, storing, recycling and processing is high in relation to limits set by climate;
- Water runoff quality is of high standard;
- Low entropy; and
- No damage to or loss of the fundamental components.

This translates to:

- A comprehensive cover of vegetation;
- Carbon levels relatively close to the limits set by soil type and climate;
- Little leakage of nutrients from the ecosystem;
- Biological and agricultural productivity relatively close to the limits set by the soil environment and climate;
- Only geological rates of erosion;
- No accumulation of contaminants; and,

An unhealthy soil thus is the simple converse of the above.

== Measurement ==
On the basis of the above, soil health will be measured in terms of individual ecosystem services provided relative to the benchmark. Specific benchmarks used to evaluate soil health include CO_{2} release, humus levels, microbial activity, and available calcium.

Soil health testing is spreading in the United States, Australia and South Africa. Cornell University, a land-grant college in NY State, has had a Soil Health Test since 2006. Woods End Laboratories, a private soil lab founded in Maine in 1975, has offered a soil quality package since 1985. Both these services combine physical (aggregate stability), chemical (mineral balance), and biological (CO_{2} respiration) analyses, which today are considered hallmarks of soil health testing. The approach of other soil labs also entering the soil health field is to add into common chemical nutrient testing a biological set of factors not normally included in routine soil testing. The best example is adding biological soil respiration ("CO_{2}-Burst") as a test procedure; this has already been adapted to modern commercial labs in the period since 2006.

There is however resistance among soil testing labs and university scientists to add new biological tests, primarily because the established metric of soil fertility is largely based on models constructed from "crop response" studies, which match crop yield to specific chemical nutrient concentrations, and no similar models appear to exist for soil health tests. Critics of novel soil health tests argue that they may be insensitive to management changes.

Soil test methods have evolved slowly over the past 40 years. However, in this same time USA soils have also lost up to 75% of their carbon (humus), causing biological fertility and ecosystem functioning to decline; how much is debatable. Many critics of the conventional system say the loss of soil quality is sufficient evidence that the old soil testing models have failed us, and need to be replaced with new approaches. These older models have stressed "maximum yield" and " yield calibration" to such an extent that related factors have been overlooked. Thus, surface and groundwater pollution with excess nutrients (nitrates and phosphates) has grown enormously, and early 2000s measures were reported (in the United States) to be the worst it has been since the 1970s, before the advent of environmental consciousness.

== Soil health gap ==
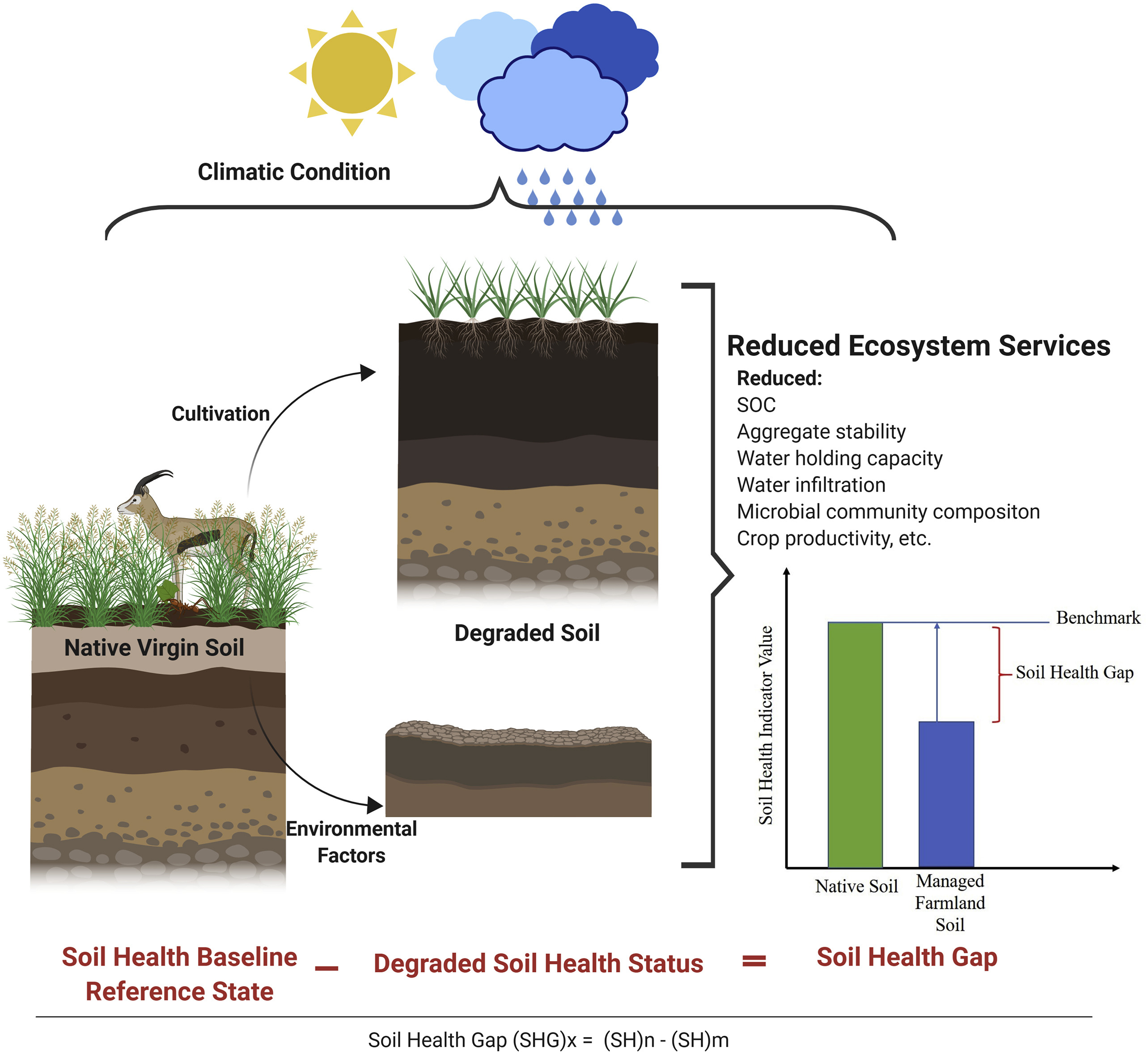
Fig. Concept of Soil Health Gap

The importance of soil for global food security, agro-ecosystem, environment, and human life has exponentially shifted the research trends toward soil health. However, the lack of a site/region-specific benchmark has limited the research toward understanding the effect of different agronomic managements on soil health. In 2020, Maharjan and his team introduced a new term and concept, "Soil Health Gap" and described how native land in a particular region can help in establishing the benchmark to compare the efficacies of different management practices and at the same time, it can be used in understanding quantitative difference in soil health status.

== See also ==
- Dryland salinity – Natural process for soil
- Ecosystem services – Benefits provided by intact ecosystems
- Soil aggregate stability – Property of soil
- Soil biodiversity
- Soil carbon – Solid carbon stored in global soils
- Soil fertility – Ability of a soil to sustain agricultural plant growth
- Soil functions – Capabilities of soils
- Soil policy (Victoria, Australia)
- Soil quality – Capacity of soil to perform ecosystem services
- Soil resilience – Ability of a soil to resist or recover its healthy state after disturbance
- Soil structure – Arrangement of a soil's particles and pore spaces
- Soil water (retention) – Hydrological property of soil
