= Land management =

Processes of managing land

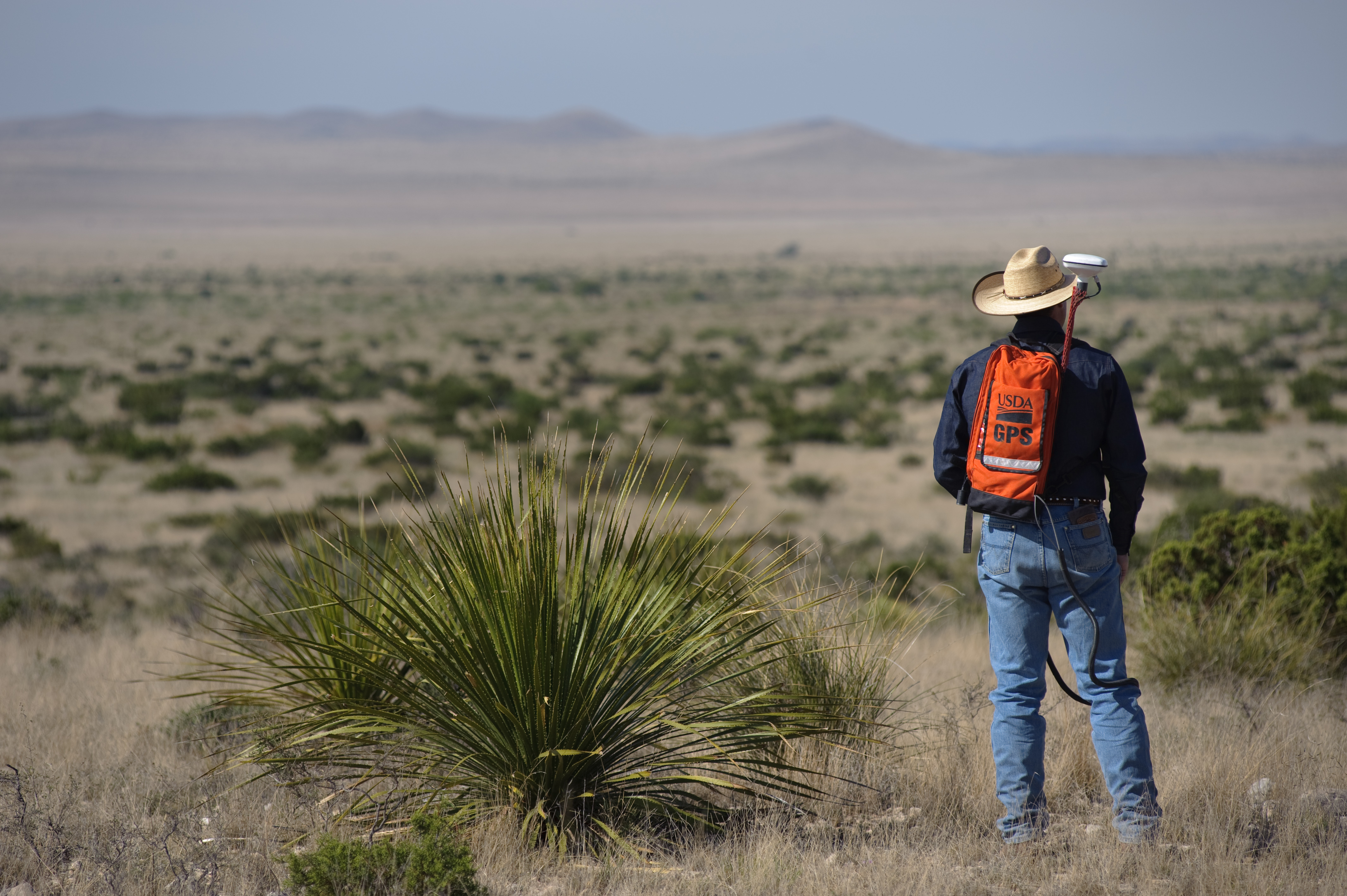
a rangeland management specialist

Land management is the process of managing the use and development of land resources. Those resources are used for a variety of purposes for example agriculture, forestry, water resource management, human settlements and tourism. One aim of land management is to prevent or reverse land degradation. Another aim is to ensure water security by increasing soil moisture availability, decreasing surface runoff, and decreasing soil erosion. Unsustainable land managements leads to land being over- or misused which in turn degrades the land, reduces productivity and disrupts natural equilibriums.

Sustainable land management (SLM) is the set of practices and technologies that aim to integrate the management of land, water, and other environmental resources to meet human needs while ensuring long-term sustainability, ecosystem services, biodiversity, and livelihoods. Sustainable forest management is a sub-category of sustainable land management.

== Definition ==
The IPCC Sixth Assessment Report describes land management as "The sum of land-use practices (e.g., sowing, fertilising, weeding, harvesting, thinning and clear-cutting) that take place within broader land-use categories." Land use itself is "The total of arrangements, activities and inputs applied to a parcel of land." Land use categories include: forest land, cropland (agricultural land), grassland, wetlands, settlements and other lands.

The United Nations Economic Commission for Europe (UNECE) applies the term land management in a wide context. Besides agriculture and forestry, they include the mineral extraction sector, property and estate management: "Land management is the process by which the resources of land are put to good effect. It covers all activities concerned with the management of land as a resource both from an environmental and from an economic perspective. It can include farming, mineral extraction, property and estate management, and the physical planning of towns and the countryside.

=== Sustainable land management ===
Sustainable land management (SLM) is a process in a charged environment between environmental protection and the guarantee claim of ecosystem services on the one hand. On the other hand, it is about productivity of agriculture and forestry with respect to demographic growth and increasing pressure in land use.

SLM has been defined in various reports as follows:

- By IPCC in 2022: "The stewardship and use of land resources, including soils, water, animals and plants, to meet changing human needs, while simultaneously ensuring the long-term productive potential of these resources and the maintenance of their environmental functions". This wording is very similar to the longer wording used by the United Nations (UN) 1992 Rio Earth Summit in 1992: "The use of land resources, including soils, water, animals and plants, for the production of goods to meet changing human needs, while simultaneously ensuring the long-term productive potential of these resources and the maintenance of their environmental functions."
- By World Bank in 2006: "SLM is defined as a knowledge-based procedure that helps integrate land, water, biodiversity, and environmental management (including input and output externalities) to meet rising food and fiber demands while sustaining ecosystem services and livelihoods.

== Purposes ==
One aim of sustainable land management is to prevent or reverse land degradation. Another aim is to ensure water security by increasing soil moisture availability, decreasing surface runoff, and decreasing soil erosion.

The IPCC stated that sustainable land management can play a role in climate change mitigation and adaptation. This takes place at various scales, at scales, namely "from individual farms to entire watersheds".

A World Bank report in 2006 explained: "SLM is necessary to meet the requirements of a growing population. Improper land management can lead to land degradation and a significant reduction in the productive and service (biodiversity niches, hydrology, carbon sequestration) functions of watersheds and landscapes."

== In climate change context ==
The IPCC's Special Report on Climate Change and Land (SRCCL) explains the linkages between sustainable land management and climate change mitigation. The full title of the report is the "Special Report on climate change, desertification, land degradation, sustainable land management, food security, and greenhouse gas fluxes in terrestrial ecosystems".

The report's summary for policy makers explains that, "Many sustainable land management technologies and practices are profitable within three to 10 years (medium confidence). While they can require upfront investment, actions to ensure sustainable land management can improve crop yields and the economic value of pasture. Land restoration and rehabilitation measures improve livelihood systems and provide both short-term positive economic returns and longer-term benefits in terms of climate change adaptation and mitigation, biodiversity and enhanced ecosystem functions and services."

== Methods ==
Land management options exist to focus on healthy soils and to "reduce vulnerability to soil erosion and nutrient loss". Examples include "growing green manure crops and cover crops, crop residue retention, reduced/zero tillage, and maintenance of ground cover through improved grazing management". There are also land management options for farmers that build soil carbon and therefore provide important climate change mitigation benefits through carbon sequestration: "agroforestry, perennial pasture phases and use of perennial grains". All these methods reduce soil erosion and nutrient leaching.

Land management options that "do not require land use change and do not create demand for more land conversion" include:

- improved management of cropland and grazing lands,
- sustainable forest management, and
- increased soil organic carbon content.

For example in Ethiopia, "over 85% of the land is estimated to be moderately to severely degraded". The current practices of sustainable land management (SLM) involve a variety of structural and nonstructural elements integrated at the catchment scale, providing different roles in managing water resources. The structural measures (soil bunds, contour trenches, etc.) significantly improve infiltration and water storage potential of the agricultural landscapes. On the other hand, the nonstructural measures, such as the elimination of open grazing on communal grazing land and the abandonment of postharvest grazing on cultivated land, help improve the water retention capacity of the soils and reduce nonproductive evaporative water losses. In addition, the current practices of SLM attempts to sustain diverse land use mosaics at the catchment scale, including protected areas (gullied lands and communal grazing lands), cultivated land and home gardens, with the aim of harnessing potential uses, services, and values from a catchment.

== See also ==
- Agenda 21 – 1992 United Nations action plan
- Carbon farming
- Conservation grazing – Use of animals to graze areas like nature reserves to maintain habitats
- Economics of Land Degradation Initiative – Global initiative for sustainable land management
- Special Report on Climate Change and Land – IPCC report
