= Yield gap =

Yield gaps for maize, rice and wheat by severity level, average 2001–2020.

Agroecological yield gaps for ten major crops, 2020

The yield gap or yield ratio is the ratio of the dividend yield of an equity and the yield of a long-term government bond. Typically equities have a higher yield (as a percentage of the market price of the equity) thus reflecting the higher risk of holding an equity.

$\mbox{Yield Gap} = \frac {\mbox{Yield Ratio of Equity}} {\mbox{Yield Ratio of Bond}}$

The purpose of calculating the yield gap is to assess whether the equity is over or under priced as compared to bonds. For a given equity, the following cases may be considered:

- If the yield gap is numerically small, then equity yield is lower than bond yield implying that the equity is overpriced.
- If the yield gap is numerically large, then equity yield is higher than bond yield implying that the equity is cheap.

== See also ==
- Yield (finance)
