= Land degradation =

Gradual destruction of land

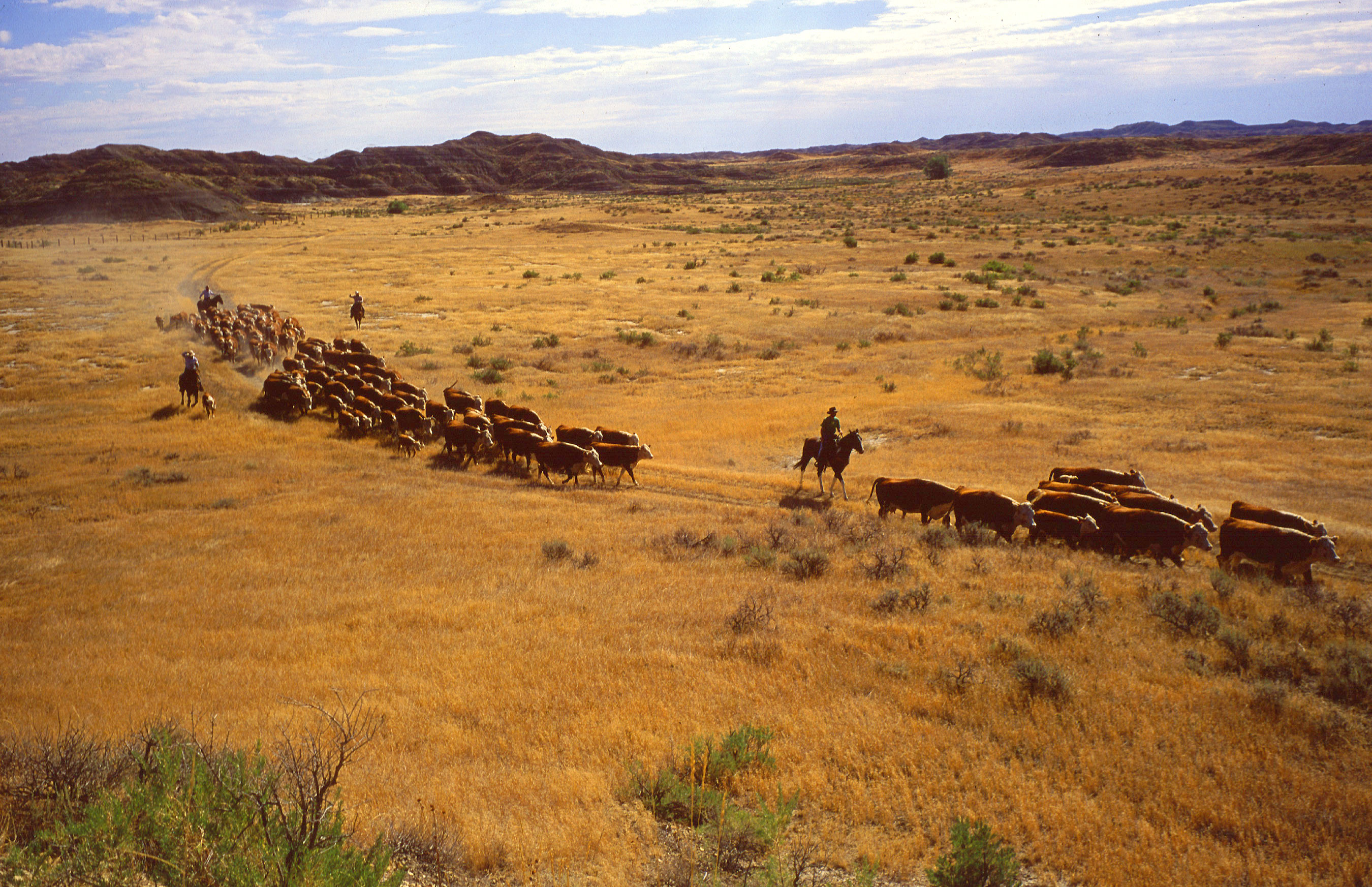
Overgrazing by livestock can lead to land degradation.

Land degradation is a process in which land becomes less healthy and productive due to a combination of human activities or natural conditions. The causes of land degradation are numerous and complex. Human activities are often the main cause, such as unsustainable land management practices. Natural hazards are excluded as a cause; however human activities can indirectly affect events such as floods and wildfires.

By 2025, unsustainable farming and management practices has led to the degradation of 9.96 million km^{2} of agricultural lands; this accounts for over 60% of human-induced land degradation, which affects a total area of more than 16.6 million km^{2}.

One possible impact of land degradation is a reduction in the natural capacity of the land to store and filter water, leading to water scarcity. Human-induced land degradation and water scarcity are increasing the levels of risk for agricultural production and ecosystem services.

The United Nations estimates that about 30% of land is degraded worldwide, and about 3.2 billion people live in these degrading areas, giving a high rate of environmental pollution. Land degradation reduces agricultural productivity, leads to biodiversity loss, and can reduce food security as well as water security. It was estimated in 2007 that up to 40% of the world's agricultural land is seriously degraded, with the United Nations estimating that the global economy could lose $23 trillion by 2050 through degradation.

== Definition ==
In the Millennium Ecosystem Assessment of 2005, land degradation is defined as "the reduction or loss of the biological or economic productivity of drylands". A similar definition states that land degradation is the "degradation, impoverishment and long-term loss of ecosystem services". It is viewed as any change or disturbance to the land perceived to be deleterious or undesirable.

The Food and Agriculture Organization of the United Nations described land degradation as "driven by human activities such as deforestation, overgrazing and unsustainable farming, refers to a persistent decline in land's ability to sustain ecosystem functions and services. Its impacts range from subtle productivity losses to complete agricultural abandonment, reinforcing the urgent need for sustainable land management or restoration.

== Scale ==
Estimated annual and average agricultural production losses due to land degradation by income group

According to the Special Report on Climate Change and Land of the Intergovernmental Panel on Climate Change in 2019: "About a quarter of the Earth's ice-free land area is subject to human-induced degradation (medium confidence). Soil erosion from agricultural fields is estimated to be currently 11 to 20 times (no-tillage) to more than 100 times (conventional tillage) higher than the soil formation rate (medium confidence)."

The United Nations estimated in 2014 that around 30% of land is degraded worldwide, and around 3.2 billion people reside in these degrading areas, giving a high rate of environmental pollution. Approximately 120,000 km^{2} of productive land—which roughly equals the size of Greece—is degraded every year. This is due to the socio-economic exploitation of lands without proper planning for long-term sustainability.

In 2021, it was claimed that two-thirds of Africa's productive land area is severely affected by land degradation.

In 2024, the United Nations claimed that 75% of soils are degraded at some extent. By the year 2050, the share of degraded land might rise to 90%, if current trends continue. During the years 2015–2019 around 1 million km^{2} of soil was degraded every year. The Global Environment Facility suggested that 95% of soil can degrade by 2050.

In 2025 around 1.7 billion people live in areas experiencing sizeable degradation-induced crop yield losses. Middle-income countries are the most affected, accounting for nearly 1 billion people. In high-income countries, intensive input use sustains yields but masks degradation and increases environmental harm. The largest affected populations reside in Eastern and Southern Asia regions that have accumulated a substantial degradation debt and also have high population densities.

== Types ==
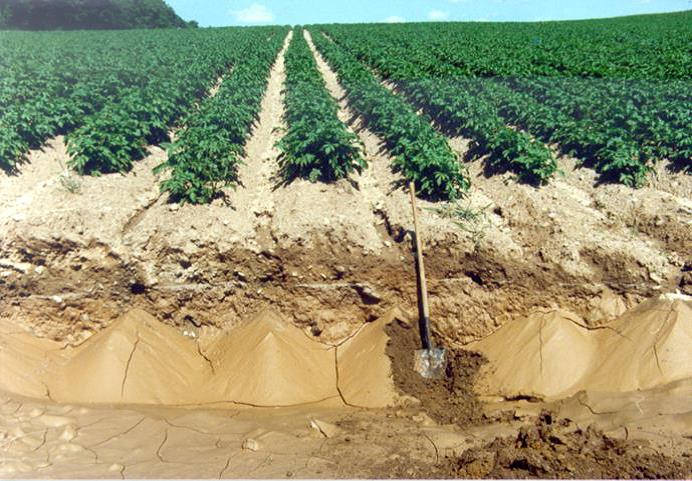
Potato field with soil erosion

Human-induced land degradation, 2020.

In addition to the usual types of land degradation that have been known for centuries (water, wind and mechanical erosion, physical, chemical and biological degradation), four other types have emerged in the last 50 years:

- pollution, often chemical, due to agricultural, industrial, mining or commercial activities;
- loss of arable land due to urban construction, road building, land conversion, agricultural expansion, etc.;
- artificial radioactivity, sometimes accidental;
- land-use constraints associated with armed conflicts.

Overall, more than 36 types of land degradation can be assessed. All are induced or aggravated by human activities, e.g. soil erosion, soil contamination, soil acidification, sheet erosion, silting, aridification, salinization, urbanization, etc.

A problem with defining land degradation is that what one group of people might view as degradation, others might view as a benefit or opportunity. For example, planting crops at a location with heavy rainfall and steep slopes would create scientific and environmental concern regarding the risk of soil erosion by water, yet farmers could view the location as a favourable one for high crop yields.

== Causes ==
The rate of global tree cover loss has approximately doubled since 2001, to an annual loss approaching an area the size of Italy.

Land degradation is mainly derived by numerous, complex, and interrelated anthropogenic and/or natural proximate and underlying causes. For example, in Ethiopia the country has been affected by chronic and ongoing land degradation processes and forms. The major proximate drivers are biophysical factors and unsustainable land management practices, while the underlying drivers are social, economic, and institutional factors.

Land degradation is a global problem largely related to the agricultural sector, general deforestation and climate change. Causes include:

- Land clearance, such as clearcutting, overlogging and deforestation
- Agricultural activities, more than 1 660 Mha of land, corresponding to more than 10 percent of the world's land area, have been degraded by unsustainable land-use and management practices, with more than 60% of this degradation occurring on agricultural lands (including cropland and pastureland). This includes:
  - Activities that lead to depletion of soil nutrients through poor farming practices such as exposure of naked soil after crop harvesting or deep plowing (areas with conventional tillage degrade 5-10 times faster than areas with no-till farming)
  - Monocultures which destabilize the local ecosystem;
  - Poor livestock farming practices such as overgrazing (the grazing of natural pastures at stocking intensities above the livestock carrying capacity);
  - Inappropriate irrigation
- Pollution of soil as a result of littering, urbanization, mining, oil spills, pesticides, herbicides, fertilizers and animal waste.
- Climate change because it can "exacerbate land degradation, particularly in low-lying coastal areas, river deltas, drylands and in permafrost areas"

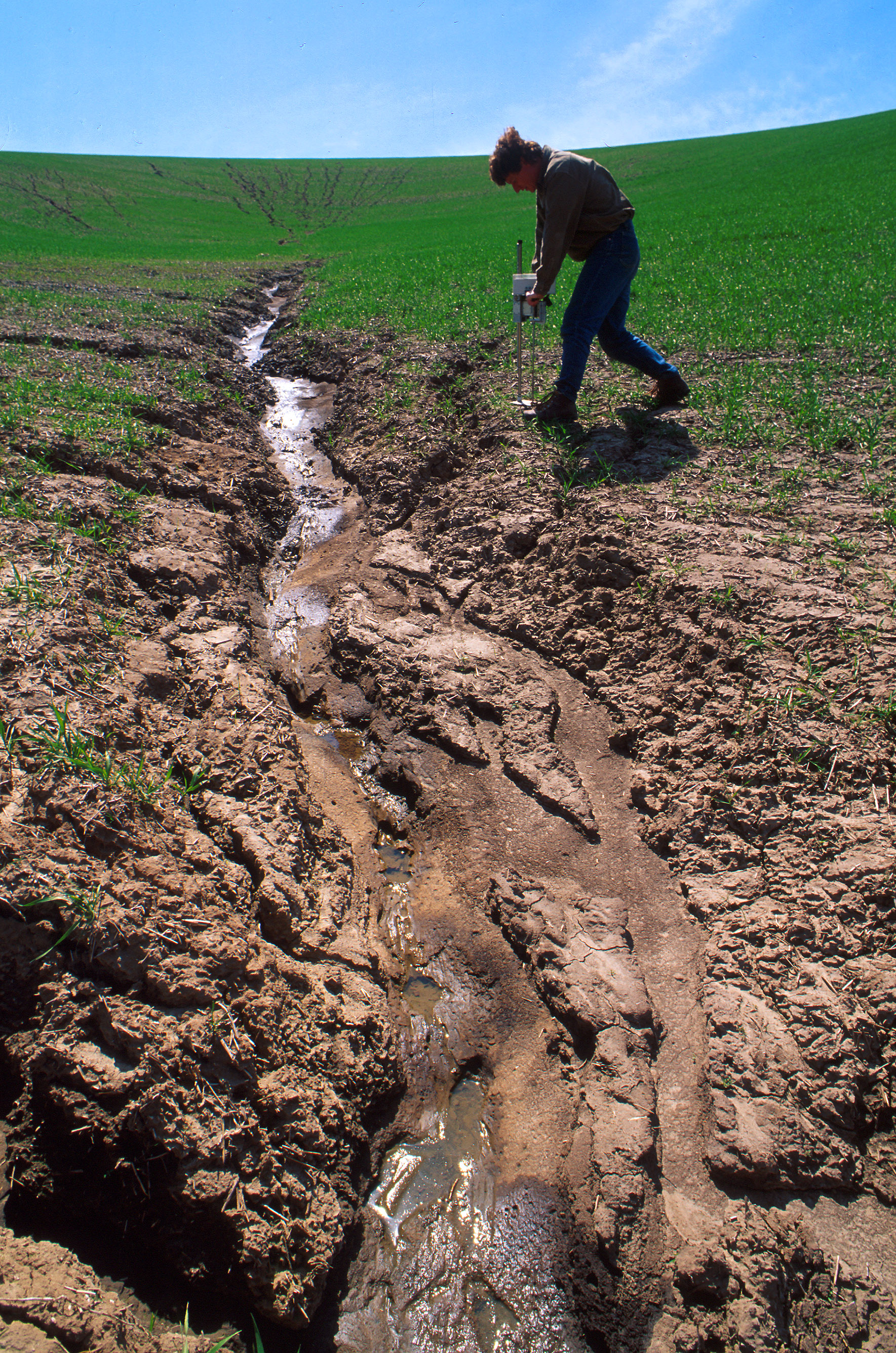
Soil erosion in a wheat field near Pullman, US

High population density is not always related to land degradation. Rather, it is the practices of the human population that can cause a landscape to become degraded.

Severe land degradation affects a significant portion of the Earth's arable lands, decreasing the wealth and economic development of nations. As the land resource base becomes less productive, food security is compromised and competition for dwindling resources increases, the seeds of famine and potential conflict are sown.

=== Climate change and land degradation ===
According to the Special Report on Climate Change and Land of the Intergovernmental Panel on Climate Change (IPCC) climate change exacerbates land degradation, especially in low-lying coastal areas, river deltas, drylands and permafrost areas. During the years 1961–2013, the area of drylands in drought rose by more than 1% per year. In 2015, about 500,000,000 people lived in areas which experienced desertification in the years 1980s - 2000s. People living in those areas are severely impacted by climate change. Additionally, it is reported that 74% of the poor are directly affected by land degradation globally.

Significant land degradation from seawater inundation, particularly in river deltas and on low-lying islands, is a potential hazard that was identified in a 2007 IPCC report.

As a result of sea-level rise from climate change, salinity levels can reach levels where agriculture becomes impossible in very low-lying areas.

In 2009 the European Investment Bank agreed to invest up to $45 million in the Land Degradation Neutrality Fund (LDN Fund). Launched at UNCCD COP 13 in 2017, the LDN Fund invests in projects that generate environmental benefits, socio-economic benefits, and financial returns for investors. The Fund was initially capitalized at US$100 million and is expected to grow to US$300 million.

In the 2022 IPCC report, land degradation is responding more directly to climate change as all types of erosion and SOM declines (soil focus) are increasing. Other land degradation pressures are also being caused by human pressures like managed ecosystems. These systems include human run croplands and pastures.

== Impacts ==
Land degradation takes many forms and affects water and land resources. It can diminish the natural capacity of the land to store and filter water leading to water scarcity.

The results of land degradation are significant and complex. They include lower crop yields, less diverse ecosystems, more vulnerability to natural disasters like floods and droughts, people losing their homes, less food available, and economic problems. Degraded land also releases greenhouse gases, making climate change worse.

Further possible impacts include:

1. A temporary or permanent decline in the productive capacity of the land. This can be seen through a loss of biomass, a loss of actual productivity or in potential productivity, or a loss or change in vegetative cover and soil nutrients.
2. Loss of biodiversity: A loss of range of species or ecosystem complexity as a decline in the environmental quality.
3. Increased vulnerability of the environment or people to destruction or crisis.
4. Wars and conflicts. Degradation of soil is one of the factors which increase competition over agricultural land, and all except 3 conflicts inside states in Africa from the 1990s are linked to such competition.
5. Environmental migration and the refugee crisis

=== Sensitivity and resilience ===
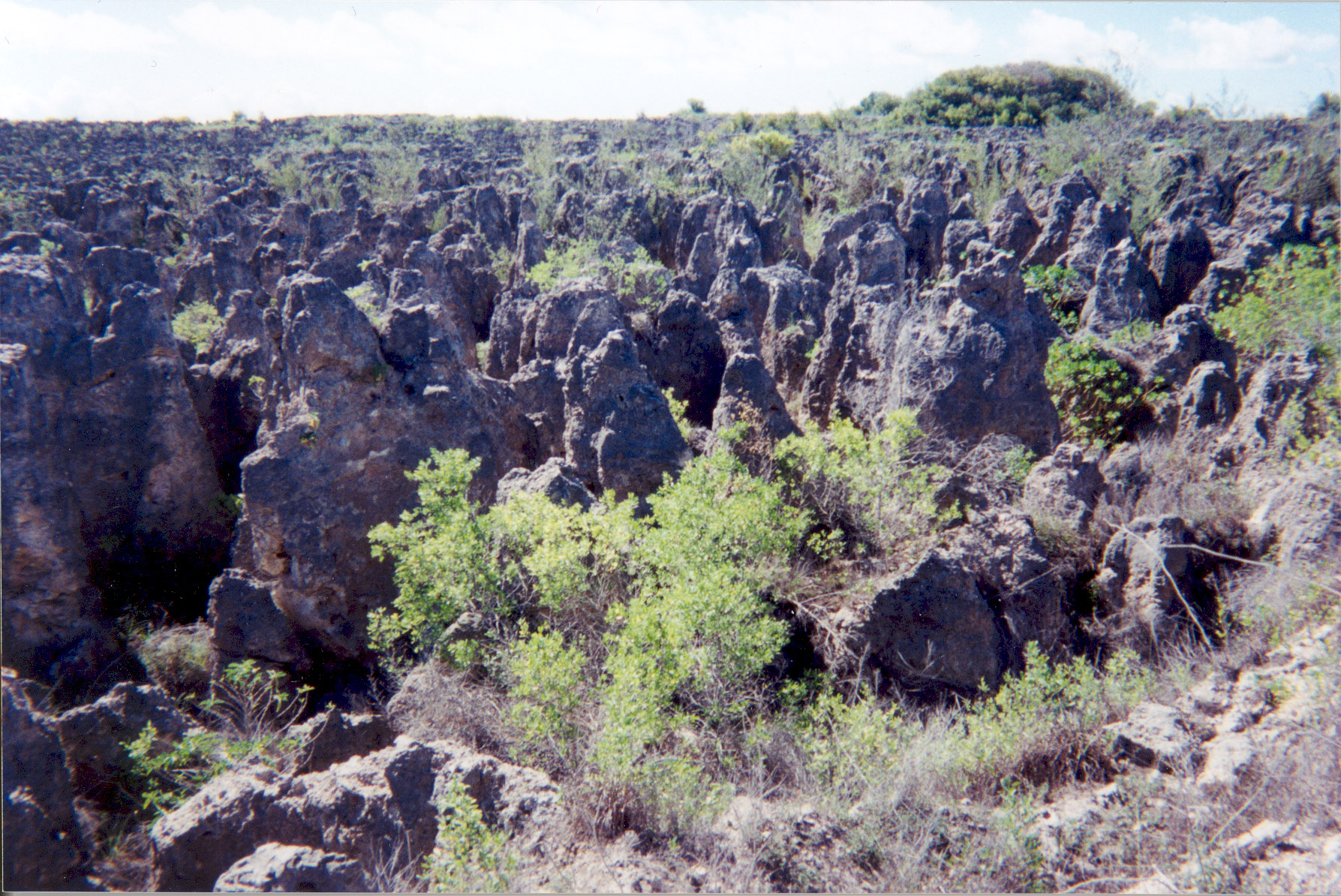
Serious land degradation in Nauru after the depletion of the phosphate cover through mining

Sensitivity and resilience are measures of the vulnerability of a landscape to degradation. These two factors combine to explain the degree of vulnerability. Sensitivity is the degree to which a land system undergoes change due to natural forces, human intervention or a combination of both. Resilience is the ability of a landscape to absorb change, without significantly altering the relationship between the relative importance and numbers of individuals and species that compose the community. It also refers to the ability of the region to return to its original state after being changed in some way. The resilience of a landscape can be increased or decreased through human interaction based upon different methods of land-use management. Land that is degraded becomes less resilient than undegraded land, which can lead to even further degradation through shocks to the landscape.

=== Agriculture ===
By 2025 unsustainable farming and management practices led to the degradation of 996 Mha of agricultural lands; this accounts for over 60% of human-induced land degradation, which affects a total area of more than 1660 million hectares.

Land degradation on farms is shaped by local choices and global drivers such as trade, climate change and demographic transitions. Farmers, as private actors, make decisions primarily based on productivity and profitability. The relationship between land degradation and agricultural productivity varies dramatically across regions and income levels. In high-income countries with intensive agricultural systems, the per hectare production losses from degradation are particularly severe, though often masked by heavy application of synthetic fertilizers and other inputs. This compensatory strategy creates a troubling paradox: while maintaining high yields in the short term, it generates diminishing returns, increases production costs, and often exacerbates the underlying degradation through soil acidification, nutrient imbalances and pollution. Threshold effects associated with land degradation may lead to land abandonment in areas with a long history of intensive agricultural systems. Most of sub-Saharan Africa exhibits relatively low degradation-induced yield losses, not because soils are healthier, but because other constraints including; limited access to inputs, mechanization, credit and markets, dominate as causes of yield gaps. Land degradation is not uniform, even within a single farm, land parcels may vary in condition.

Farm size strongly influences land management and food production strategies, as well as farmers' ability to address land degradation. Of the world's 570 million farms, 85% are smaller than 2 hectares (ha) and cultivate just 9% of farmland, while the 0.1% of farms over 1,000 ha control nearly 50%. Medium-sized farms, those between 2 ha and 50 ha – play a particularly important role in Africa and Asia, where they manage about half of all agricultural land.

Southern Asia and sub-Saharan Africa are regions where degraded lands coincide with high poverty rates and childhood stunting. In 2025, 47 million children under five years of age suffering from stunting live in areas where stunting overlaps with significant yield losses from land degradation. These areas represent a convergence of environmental degradation and human deprivation.

== Prevention and reversal ==
=== Reversal ===
Reversing just 10% of human-induced degradation of croplands could restore production sufficient to feed an additional 154 million people annually. However, this represent only a fraction of the true cost. These estimates overlook the role of degradation in land abandonment. Research suggests that restoring abandoned croplands to productive use could potentially feed between 292 and 476 million people. Second, the estimates exclude impacts on pasturelands and the broader ecosystem services that benefit society at large, making land degradation a challenge requiring collective action for the provision of these public goods.

=== Regenerative agriculture ===
Regenerative agriculture has emerged as an ecological strategy to reverse land degradation by restoring soil health, biodiversity, and ecosystem services. Unlike conventional farming practices—such as intensive tillage and chemical inputs that accelerate soil erosion and nutrient depletion. regenerative practices prioritize continuous organic ground cover, minimal soil disturbance, diverse crop rotations, and integrated rotational grazing.

=== Prevention ===
==== Sustainable land management ====
List of UN Food and Agriculture Organization recommended responses across land degradation stages from improving land management to full-scale land restoration.

Actions to halt land degradation can be broadly classified as prevention, mitigation, and restoration interventions.

Sustainable land management has been proven in reversing land degradation. It also ensures water security by increasing soil moisture availability, decreasing surface runoff, decreasing soil erosion, leading to an increased infiltration, and decreased flood discharge.

The United Nations Sustainable Development Goal 15 has a target to restore degraded land and soil and achieve a land degradation-neutral world by 2030. The full title of Target 15.3 is: "By 2030, combat desertification, restore degraded land and soil, including land affected by desertification, drought and floods, and strive to achieve a land degradation-neutral world."

==== Public awareness and education ====
Increasing public awareness about the importance of land conservation, sustainable land management, and the consequences of land degradation is vital for fostering behavioral change and mobilizing support for action. Education, outreach campaigns, and knowledge-sharing platforms can empower individuals, communities, and stakeholders to adopt more sustainable practices and become stewards of the land.

== See also ==
- Environmental impact of irrigation
- Land improvement
- Land reclamation
- Sustainable agriculture
- Economics of Land Degradation Initiative
- Population growth
- Soil § Degradation
- Tillage erosion

== Sources ==
This article incorporates text from a free content work. Licensed under CC BY 4.0 (license statement/permission). Text taken from The State of Food and Agriculture 2025, Food and Agriculture Organization of the United Nations.

This article incorporates text from a free content work. Licensed under CC BY 4.0 (license statement/permission). Text taken from The State of the World's Land and Water Resources for Food and Agriculture 2025, Food and Agriculture Organization of the United Nations (FAO).
