= Economics of Land Degradation Initiative =

Global initiative for sustainable land management

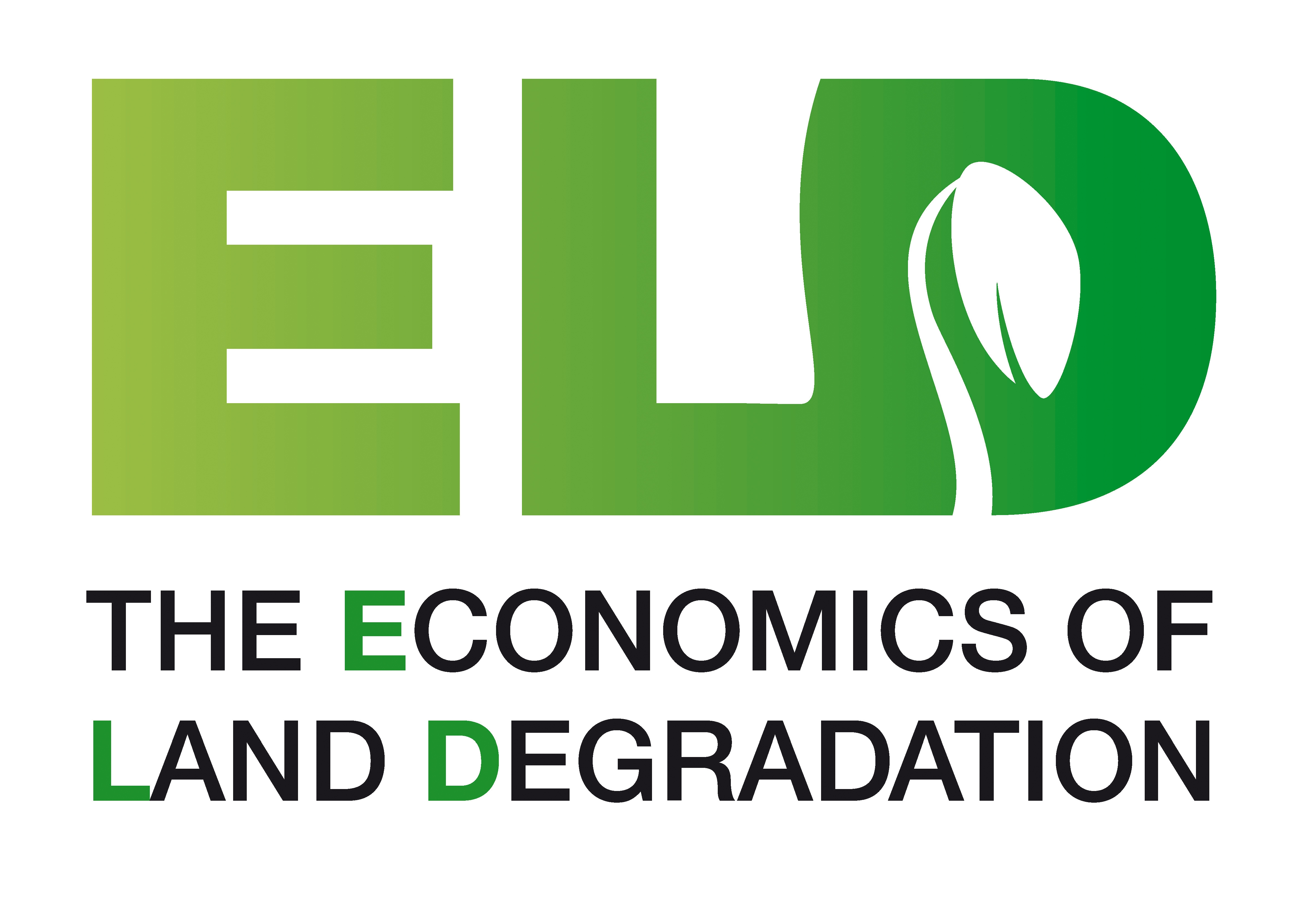

The Economics of Land Degradation (ELD) Initiative is a global initiative which aims to increase awareness of the benefits of sustainable land management and economic consequences of land degradation.

The ELD Initiative was co-founded in 2011 by the Secretariat of the United Nations Convention to Combat Desertification (UNCCD), the German Federal Ministry for Economic Cooperation and Development (BMZ), the European Commission (EC) and is hosted by the Deutsche Gesellschaft für Internationale Zusammenarbeit (GIZ) GmbH. The ELD Secretariat is based in Bonn, Germany.

The ELD Initiative is focused on developing globally relevant data and methodology on the economic benefits of land and land based ecosystems for decision-makers. This way, the Initiative highlights the benefits of adopting sustainable land management practices and seeks to establish a global approach to conducting economic analyses of land management. Moreover, the ELD Initiative provides a platform for discussion between stakeholders from the policy, science and private sectors, as well as a Knowledge Hub providing a database of educational materials, related knowledge and access to a broad range of scientific and policy publications.

== Background ==
=== Land degradation ===
Land degradation and desertification threaten peoples’ livelihood on a global scale. Every year, 20 million hectares of fertile land become degraded and within the last 40 years, around one third of the total agricultural land on earth has become unproductive through degradation processes. Less developed countries are more vulnerable to desertification and land degradation, as they lack the infrastructure and capital to deal with this threat and implement long-term sustainable land management. Soil on degraded land is less resilient and crops grown on degraded soil produce lower yields. Land degradation also negatively influences global food security: in the next 25 years, global food production might drop by up to 12%. This will lead to an increase in average food prices of up to 30%. Estimates show that the annual costs of land degradation are up to €3.4 trillion. Paired with the growing world population and an increasing demand for alternative land management products such as biofuels land degradation causes poverty, food insecurity, reduced availability of clean water, and increased vulnerability towards climate change and extreme weather conditions.

Land is covered by different ecosystems, which can be valued to include all the services they provide to society: supporting, regulating, provisioning and cultural services. These ecosystem services were estimated in 2011 to have a global worth of US$125 trillion/yr. This shows a decrease of US$20.2 trillion/yr since 1997, caused by land use and management changes .^{[6]} Sustainable land management practices are not usually costly to take up, and could deliver up to US$1.4 trillion, merely in crop production, if adopted .^{[7]}

=== Economic valuation of land degradation ===
Economics of land degradation look at the true costs of degrading land and land-based ecosystems as well as the benefits that derive from sustainable management of land and land-based ecosystems. The ELD Initiative provides ground-truthed tools and assessments that allow other parties to undertake cost-benefit analyses of land and land use through total economic valuation. This approach helps to shine a light on the hidden values of land that are very often not considered when taking decisions about its management (e.g., nutrient cycling, water retention, storm protection).

The ELD Initiative also recognises that some aspects of land are invaluable in that the very existence of humanity depends on the land and thus has infinite value. Nevertheless, economic information is used by decision makers for land use, land use change and management. Fully informed economic valuations are a central component of these decision-making processes, especially as economics provide a common language for different stakeholders to discuss their needs, costs, and gains, and come to optimal, mutually beneficial sustainable land management strategies.

== Structure ==
=== Formation ===
In 2010, a scientific foundation was created to promote the issues of sustainable land management and food security on a scientifically sound basis and increase public awareness for the importance of productive soils.

The Initiative is guided by a Steering Group consisting of the German Federal Ministry of Economic Cooperation and Development, the European Commission, and the permanent Secretariat to the UNCCD, and coordinated by the ELD Secretariat. The Initiative produces reports for decision makers and practitioners, case studies, policy briefs and education materials. These outputs are distributed to and applied by its policy, private sector and scientific partners. The ELD Secretariat is responsible for the coordination of processes within the Initiative and serves as the first contact point for all existing and potential partners.

=== ELD Ambassadors ===
The Initiative is also represented by ELD Ambassadors, who play a crucial role in the coordination of ELD activities on the national level and represent the Initiative in their respective countries. In their function as ambassadors, they help:

- to establish linkages between research institutions and the policy sector to motivate and facilitate science-policy dialogues regarding the need for a shift of policies towards the promotion of sustainable land management practices;
- to lobby for holistic economic valuation in the research and policy community, taking into account the value of ecosystem services;
- to disseminate results of ELD studies on national and international level in order to attract attention to the economic dimension of land degradation and benefits of sustainable land management.

=== Partners ===
The ELD Initiative has a global network of partners including CGIAR Research Program on Dryland Systems, United Nations University Institute for Water, Environment and Health (UNU-INWEH), Stockholm Environment Institute, World Agroforestry Centre (ICRAF), UNDP, UNEP, Australian National University, University of Leeds, AMURE, ICARDA, Global Mechanism and IUCN.

ELD Initiative further focuses on collaborating with the Private Sector as one of the main drivers for land degradation processes,^{[9]}to help businesses identify eco-investment opportunities and incentives linked to the preservation and sustainable management of soils.

== Outputs ==
=== Publications ===
The ELD Initiative has an database of publications targeted at a variety of stakeholders. These include the 'Scientific Interim Report’, which details the general approach and methods considered by the Initiative and the 'Business Brief' outlines a methodology for risk assessment. In 2015, ELD published reports tailored for policymakers and the private sector.

In September 2015, ELD produced a ‘main’ report, The Value of Land. This publication details the monetary worth of land, the steps and methods that can be used to effectively conduct economic assessments of land values, and actions for the successful management and use thereof. Additionally, it provides global scenarios with information on important ecosystems and the potential future impacts based on the various possible economic conditions governing its management. The significance of stakeholder engagement is outlined with country-level examples. The report was launched at the 70th United Nations General Assembly in Brussels.

=== Capacity building courses ===
The ELD Initiative further offers Capacity building activities for decision-makers through MOOCs, trainings and national level learning and teaching materials to engage researchers and current and future decision-makers.

=== ELD Campus ===
In 2019, the ELD Initiative launched the ELD Campus, which offers a learning and teaching toolkit for the valuation of ecosystem services. It can be used at different levels – from policymakers and researchers, to students and aspiring ELD practitioners – in all fields of scientific background.

The campus provides a comprehensive education toolkit to gain:

- An awareness of the rationale behind economic valuation of ecosystem services;
- An understanding of how economic valuation is done and how the information can be used:
  - in policy-making and planning regarding land use;
  - in the field as an ELD practitioner;
  - in training curricula.
- In-depth methodological knowledge on how to apply the ELD approach to economic valuations of ecosystem services.

== Activities ==
The ELD Initiative is focused on stakeholder dialogues, capacity building and technical expertise and development of solutions. Specifically, the Initiative works in the following five activity areas:

- Awareness Raising: Communicating recommendations to land users, owners and public and private decision-makers to improve land management.
- Capacity Development: Training to build or develop capacity, both in-class, online and through guided application of the ELD approach.
- Stakeholder Consultation: Bringing together a range of experts and policy-decision makers to work together at the science-policy interface.
- Study Design/Research: Producing syntheses of methods and develop case studies serving as examples of holistic assessments.
- Policy Dialogue: Contributing to science-policy dialogue by providing evidence that may help review, revise and redesign policy to better promote more sustainable land management and in the Green Economy context.

=== Current activities - Regreening Africa Project ===
The Regreening Africa Project, co-funded by the German Federal Ministry of Economic Cooperation and Development, the European Commission's Directorate-General for International Cooperation and Development (DG DEVCO) and carried out jointly by the Economics of Land Degradation (ELD) Initiative and ICRAF started in 2017. It aims to improve livelihoods, food security and climate change resilience by restoring ecosystem services. The project target countries are Ethiopia, Ghana, Kenya, Mali, Niger, Rwanda, Senegal, and Somalia.

The ELD Initiative led the first phase of the project from 2017 - 2020 by conducting case study cost-benefit analyses in each target country. These case studies are aimed at raising awareness of the threats and opportunities of different land use options, and extending the capacity of national experts to assess the economic benefits of investments in sustainable land management in consideration of the costs of land degradation. Based on these assessments, decision-makers and administrators will have access to scientific information on the economic consequences of land degradation and optional pathways to rural growth.

The results of the Initiative's work facilitate the initiation of policy dialogues, aiming to create additional awareness for the issue of land degradation and raising additional investments into sustainable land management measures, notably into Farmer-Managed Natural Regeneration (FMNR).

The project is financed by the European Commission and co-financed by the German Federal Ministry for Economic Cooperation and Development (BMZ) and is carried out jointly by the Economics of Land Degradation (ELD) Initiative and ICRAF.
