= Stöber process =

Chemical preparation for silica particles

The Stöber process is a chemical process used to prepare silica (SiO_{2}) particles of controllable and uniform size for applications in materials science. It was pioneering when it was reported by Werner Stöber and his team in 1968, and remains today the most widely used wet chemistry synthetic approach to silica nanoparticles. It is an example of a sol-gel process wherein a molecular precursor (typically tetraethylorthosilicate) is first reacted with water in an alcoholic solution, the resulting molecules then joining to build larger structures. The reaction produces silica particles with diameters ranging from 50 to 2000 nm, depending on conditions. The process has been actively researched since its discovery, including efforts to understand its kinetics and mechanism – a particle aggregation model was found to be a better fit for the experimental data than the initially hypothesized LaMer model. The newly acquired understanding has enabled researchers to exert a high degree of control over particle size and distribution and to fine-tune the physical properties of the resulting material in order to suit intended applications.

In 1999 a two-stage modification was reported that allowed the controlled formation of silica particles with small holes. The process is undertaken at low pH in the presence of a surface-active molecule. The hydrolysis step is completed with the formation of a microemulsion before adding sodium fluoride to nucleate the condensation process. The non-ionic surfactant is burned away to produce empty pores, increasing the surface area and altering the surface characteristics of the resulting particles, allowing for much greater control over the physical properties of the material. Development work has also been undertaken for larger pore structures such as macroporous monoliths, shell-core particles based on polystyrene, cyclen, or polyamines, and carbon spheres.

Silica produced using the Stöber process is an ideal material to serve as a model for studying colloid phenomena because of the monodispersity (uniformity) of its particle sizes. Nanoparticles prepared using the Stöber process have found applications including in the delivery of medications to within cellular structures and in the preparation of biosensors. Porous silica Stöber materials have applications in catalysis and liquid chromatography due to their high surface area and their uniform, tunable, and highly ordered pore structures. Highly effective thermal insulators known as aerogels can also be prepared using Stöber methods, and Stöber techniques have been applied to prepare non-silica aerogel systems. Applying supercritical drying techniques, a Stöber silica aerogel with a specific surface area of 700 m^{2}⋅g^{−1} and a density of 0.040 g⋅cm^{−3} can be prepared. NASA has prepared silica aerogels with a Stöber-process approach for both the Mars Pathfinder and Stardust missions.

== One-step process ==
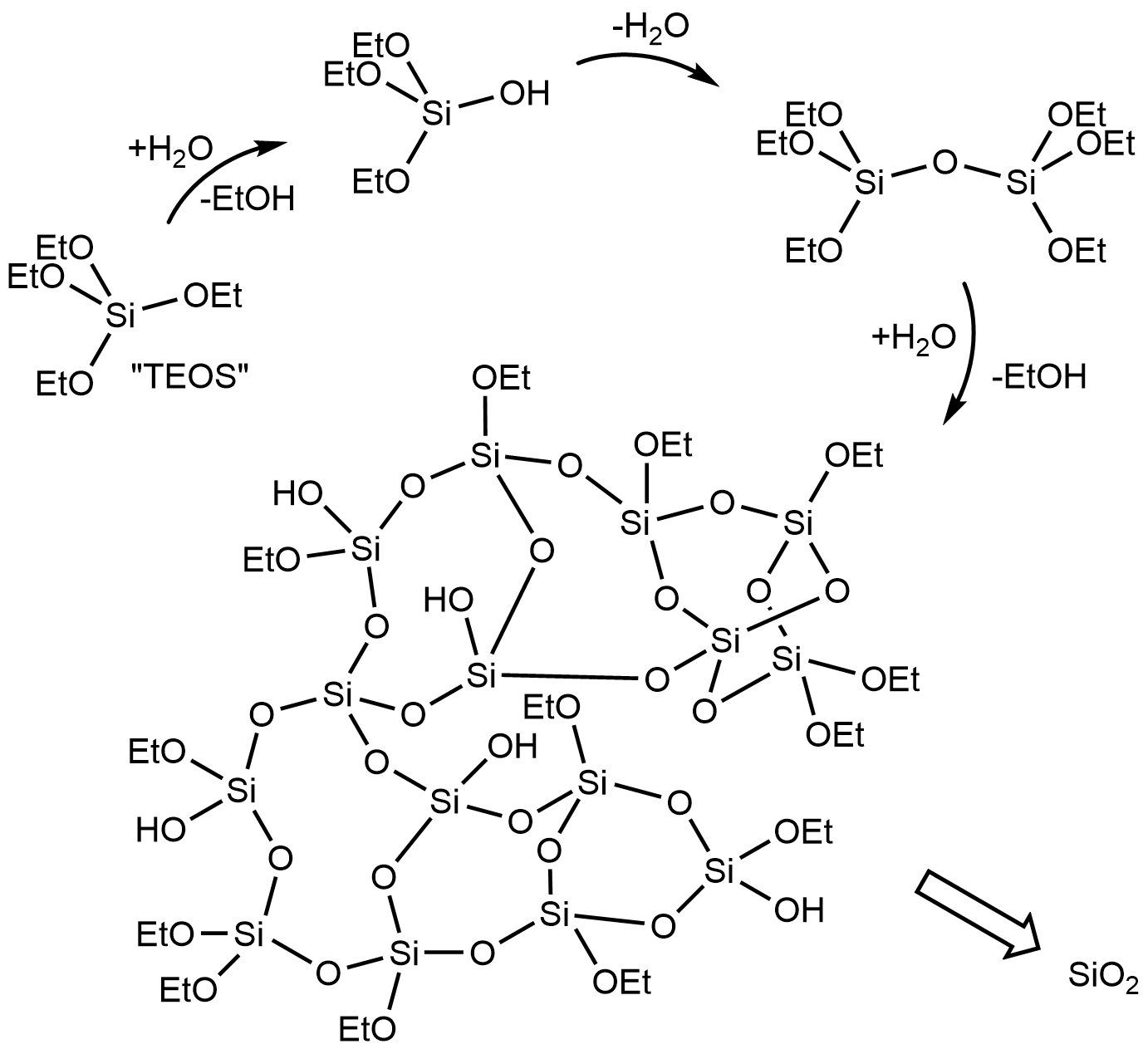
Simplified representation of the hydrolysis and condensation of TEOS in the Stöber process

The Stöber process is a sol-gel approach to preparing monodisperse (uniform) spherical silica (SiO_{2}) materials that was developed by a team led by Werner Stöber and reported in 1968. The process, an evolution and extension of research described in Gerhard Kolbe's 1956 PhD dissertation, was an innovative discovery that still has wide applications more than 50 years later. Silica precursor tetraethyl orthosilicate (Si(OEt)_{4}, TEOS) is hydrolyzed in alcohol (typically methanol or ethanol) in the presence of ammonia as a catalyst:

$$\ce{Si(OEt)4 + H2O -> Si(OEt)3OH + EtOH}$$
$$\ce{Si(OEt)4 + 2H2O -> Si(OEt)2(OH)2 + 2EtOH}$$

The reaction produces ethanol and a mixture of ethoxysilanols (such as Si(OEt)_{3}OH, Si(OEt)_{2}(OH)_{2}, and even Si(OH)_{4}), which can then condense with either TEOS or another silanol with loss of alcohol or water:

$$\ce{2Si(OEt)3OH -> (EtO)3Si-O-Si(OEt)3 + H2O}$$
$$\ce{Si(OEt)3OH + Si(OEt)4 -> (EtO)3Si-O-Si(OEt)3 + EtOH}$$
$$\ce{Si(OEt)3OH + Si(OEt)2(OH)2 -> (EtO)3Si-O-Si(OEt)2OH + H2O}$$

Further hydrolysis of the ethoxy groups and subsequent condensation leads to crosslinking. It is a one-step process as the hydrolysis and condensation reactions occur together in a single reaction vessel.

The process affords microscopic particles of colloidal silica with diameters ranging from 50 to 2000 nm; particle sizes are fairly uniform with the distribution determined by the choice of conditions such as reactant concentrations, catalysts, and temperature. Larger particles are formed when the concentrations of water and ammonia are raised, but with a consequent broadening of the particle-size distribution. The initial concentration of TEOS is inversely proportional to the size of the resulting particles; thus, higher concentrations on average lead to smaller particles due to the greater number of nucleation sites, but with a greater spread of sizes. Particles with irregular shapes can result when the initial precursor concentration is too high. The process is temperature-dependent, with cooling (and hence slower reaction rates) leading to a monotonic increase in average particle size, but control over size distribution cannot be maintained at overly low temperatures.

== Two-step process ==
In 1999 Cédric Boissière and his team developed a two-step process whereby the hydrolysis at low pH (1 – 4) is completed before the condensation reaction is initiated by the addition of sodium fluoride (NaF). The two-step procedure includes the addition of a nonionic surfactant template to ultimately produce mesoporous silica particles. The main advantage of sequencing the hydrolysis and condensation reactions is the ability to ensure complete homogeneity of the surfactant and the precursor TEOS mixture. Consequently, the diameter and shape of the product particles as well as the pore size are determined solely by the reaction kinetics and the quantity of sodium fluoride introduced; higher relative fluoride levels produces a greater number of nucleation sites and hence smaller particles. Decoupling the hydrolysis and condensation process affords a level of product control that is substantially superior to that afforded by the one-step Stöber process, with particle size controlled nearly completely by the sodium fluoride-to-TEOS ratio.

The two-step Stöber process begins with a mixture of TEOS, water, alcohol, and a nonionic surfactant, to which hydrochloric acid is added to produce a microemulsion. This solution is allowed to stand until hydrolysis is complete, much like in the one-step Stöber process but with the hydrochloric acid replacing the ammonia as catalyst. Sodium fluoride is added to the resulting homogeneous solution, initiating the condensation reaction by acting as nucleation seed. The silica particles are collected by filtration and calcined to remove the nonionic surfactant template by combustion, resulting in the mesoporous silica product.

The selection of conditions for the process allows for control of pore sizes, particle diameter, and their distributions, as in the case of the one-step approach. Porosity in the modified process is controllable through the introduction of a swelling agent, the choice of temperature, and the quantity of sodium fluoride catalyst added. A swelling agent (such as mesitylene) causes increases in volume and hence in pore size, often by solvent absorption, but is limited by the solubility of the agent in the system. Pore size varies directly with temperature, bound by the lower out of the surfactant cloud point and the boiling point of water. Sodium fluoride concentration produces direct but non-linear changes in porosity, with the effect decreasing as the added fluoride concentration tends to an upper limit.

== Kinetics ==
The LaMer model for the kinetics of the formation of hydrosols is widely applicable for production of monodisperse systems, and it was originally hypothesized that the Stöber process followed this monomer addition model. This model includes a rapid burst of nucleation forming all of the particle growth sites, then proceeds with hydrolysis as the rate-limiting step for condensation of triethylsilanol monomers to the nucleation sites. The production of monodisperse particle sizes is attributed to monomer addition happening at a slower rate on larger particles as a consequence of diffusion-limited mass transfer of TEOS. However, experimental evidence demonstrates that the concentration of hydrolyzed TEOS stays above that required for nucleation until late into the reaction, and the introduction of seeded growth nuclei does not match the kinetics of a monomer addition process. Consequently, the LaMer model has been rejected in favour of a kinetic model based around growth via particle aggregation.

Under an aggregation-based model, nucleation sites are continually being generated and absorbed where the merging leads to particle growth. The generation of the nucleation sites and the interaction energy between merging particles dictates the overall kinetics of the reaction. The generation of the nucleation sites follows the equation below:

$$J = g_s(e^{-k_1t}-e^{-k_2t})$$

where J is the nucleation rate, k_{1} and k_{2} are rate constants based on the concentrations of H_{2}O and NH_{3} and g_{s} is the normalization factor based on the amount of silica precursor. Adjusting the concentration ratios of these compounds directly influences the rate at which nucleation sites are produced.

Merging of nucleation sites between particles is influenced by their interaction energies. The total interaction energy is dependent on three forces: electrostatic repulsion of like charges, van der Waals attraction between particles, and the effects of solvation. These interaction energies (equations below) describe the particle aggregation process and demonstrate why the Stöber process produces particles that are uniform in size.

$$V_T = V_{\text{vdw}} + V_{\text{elec}} + V_{\text{solv}}$$

The van der Waals attraction forces are governed by the following equation:

$$V_{\text{vdw}}=-\frac{A_\text{H}}{6}\left[\frac{2a_1a_2}{R^2-(a_1+a_2)^2}+\frac{2a_1a_2}{R^2-(a_1-a_2)^2}+\ln\frac{R^2-(a_1+a_2)^2}{R^2-(a_1-a_2)^2}\right]$$

where A_{H} is the Hamaker constant, R is the distance between the centers of the two particles and a_{1}, a_{2} are the radii of the two particles. For electrostatic repulsion force the equation is as follows:

$V_{\text{elec}} = 4\pi\varepsilon a_1a_2Y_1Y_2\left(\frac{k_\text{B}T}{e}\right)^2 \frac{e^{-\kappa x}}{x+a_1+a_2}$ where $Y_i = \frac{8\tanh\frac{e\varphi_0}{4k_\text{B}T}}{1+\sqrt{1-\frac{2\kappa a_i+1}{(\kappa a_i+1)^2}\tanh^2\frac{e\varphi_0}{4k_\text{B}T}}}$

Where ε is the dielectric constant of the medium, k_{B} is the Boltzmann constant, e is the elementary charge, T is the absolute temperature, κ is the inverse Debye length for a 1:1 electrolyte, x is the (variable) distance between the particles, and φ_{0} is the surface potential. The final component of the total interaction energy is the solvation repulsion which is as follows:

$$V_{\text{solv}}=\pi A_\text{s}L\left[\frac{2a_1a_2}{a_1+a_2}\right]e^\frac{-(R-a_1-a_2)}{L}$$

where A_{s} is the pre-exponential factor (1.5 × 10^{−3} J⋅m^{−2}) and L is the decay length (1 × 10^{−9} m).

This model for controlled growth aggregation fits with experimental observations from small-angle X-ray scattering techniques and accurately predicts particle sizing based on initial conditions. In addition, experimental data from techniques including microgravity analysis and variable pH analysis agree with predictions from the aggregate growth model.

== Morphological variations ==
Several different structural and compositional motifs can be prepared using the Stöber process by the addition of chemical compounds to the reaction mixture. These additives can interact with the silica through chemical and/or physical means either during or after the reaction, leading to substantial changes in morphology of the silica particles.

=== Mesoporous silica ===
TEM image of a nanoparticle of mesoporous silica

The one-step Stöber process may be modified to manufacture porous silica by adding a surfactant template to the reaction mixture and calcining the resulting particles. Surfactants that have been used include cetrimonium bromide, cetyltrimethylammonium chloride, and glycerol. The surfactant forms micelles, small near-spherical balls with a hydrophobic interior and a hydrophilic surface, around which the silica network grows, producing particles with surfactant- and solvent-filled channels. Calcining the solid leads to removal of the surfactant and solvent molecules by combustion and/or evaporation, leaving mesopore voids throughout the structure, as seen in the illustration at right.

Varying the surfactant concentration allows control over the diameter and volume of pores, and thus of the surface area of the product material. Increasing the amount of surfactant leads to increases in total pore volume and hence particle surface area, but with individual pore diameters remaining unchanged. Altering the pore diameter can be achieved by varying the amount of ammonia used relative to surfactant concentration; additional ammonia leads to pores with greater diameters, but with a corresponding decrease in total pore volume and particle surface area. The time allowed for the reaction to proceed also influences porosity, with greater reaction times leading to increases in total pore volume and particle surface area. Longer reaction times also lead to increases in overall silica particle size and related decreases in the uniformity of the size distribution.

=== Macroporous monolith ===
The addition of polyethylene glycol (PEG) to the process causes silica particles to aggregate into a macroporous continuous block, allowing access to a monolithic morphology. PEG polymers with allyl or silyl end groups with a molecular weight of greater than 2000 g⋅mol^{−1} are required. The Stöber process is initiated under neutral pH conditions, so that the PEG polymers will congregate around the outside of the growing particles, providing stabilization. Once the aggregates are sufficiently large, the PEG-stabilized particles will contact and irreversibly fuse together by "sticky aggregation" between the PEG chains. This continues until complete flocculation of all the particles has occurred and the monolith has been formed, at which point the monolith may be calcined and the PEG removed, resulting in a macroporous silica monolith. Both particle size and sticky aggregation can be controlled by varying the molecular weight and concentration of PEG.

=== Shell-core particles ===
Several additives, including polystyrene, cyclen, and polyamines, to the Stöber process allow the creation of shell-core silica particles. Two configurations of the shell-core morphology have been described. One is a silica core with an outer shell of an alternative material such as polystyrene. The second is a silica shell with a morphologically different core such as a polyamine.

The creation of the polystrene/silica core composite particles begins with creation of the silica cores via the one-step Stöber process. Once formed, the particles are treated with oleic acid, which is proposed to react with the surface silanol groups. Styrene is polymerized around the fatty-acid-modified silica cores. By virtue of size distribution of the silica cores, the styrene polymerizes around them evenly resulting composite particles are similarly sized.

The silica shell particles created with cyclen and other polyamine ligands are created in a much different fashion. The polyamines are added to the Stöber reaction in the initial steps along with the TEOS precursor. These ligands interact with the TEOS precursor, resulting in an increase in the speed of hydrolysis; however, as a result they get incorporated into the resulting silica colloids. The ligands have several nitrogen sites that contain lone pairs of electrons that interact with the hydrolyzed end groups of TEOS. Consequently, the silica condense around the ligands encapsulating them. Subsequently, the silica/ligand capsules stick together to create larger particles. Once all of the ligand has been consumed by the reaction the remaining TEOS aggregates around the outside of the silica/ligand nanoparticles, creating a solid silica outer shell. The resultant particle has a solid silica shell and an internal core of silica-wrapped ligands. The sizes of the particles cores and shells can be controlled through selection of the shape of the ligands along with the initial concentrations added to the reaction.

== Carbon spheres ==
A Stöber-like process has been used to produce monodisperse carbon spheres using resorcinol-formaldehyde resin in place of a silica precursor. The modified process allows production of carbon spheres with smooth surfaces and a diameter ranging from 200 to 1000 nm. Unlike the silica-based Stöber process, this reaction is completed at neutral pH and ammonia has a role in stabilizing the individual carbon particles by preventing self-adhesion and aggregation, as well as acting as a catalyst.

== Advantages and applications ==
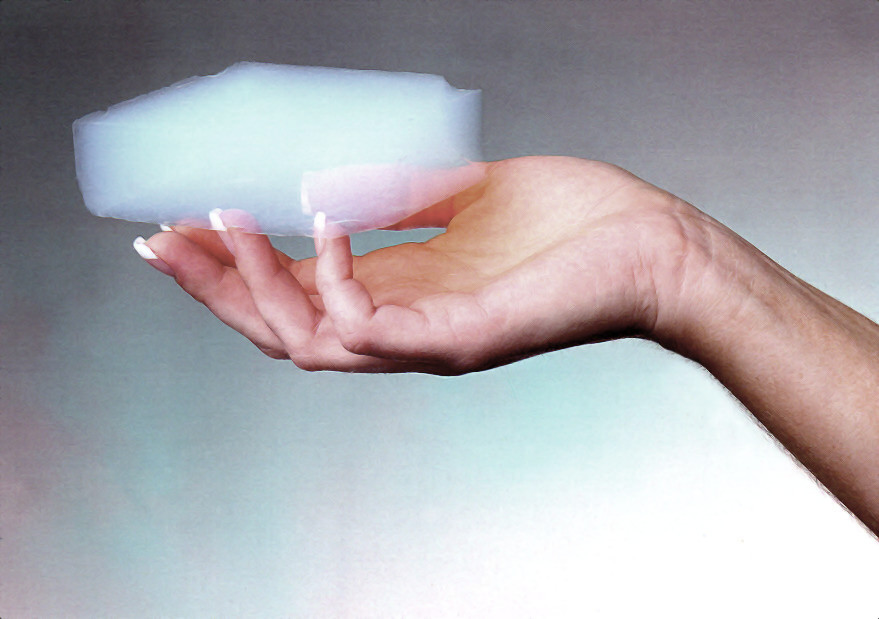
A block of an aerogel, a "solid blue smoke", which feels like very light-weight styrofoam to the touch

One major advantage of the Stöber process is that it can produce silica particles that are nearly monodisperse, and thus provides an ideal model for use in studying colloidal phenomena. It was a pioneering discovery when first published, allowing synthesis of spherical monodisperse silica particles of controlled sizes, and in 2015 remains the most widely used wet chemistry approach to silica nanoparticles.

The process provides a convenient approach to preparing silica nanoparticles for applications including intracellular drug delivery and biosensing. The mesoporous silica nanoparticles prepared by modified Stöber processes have applications in the field of catalysis and liquid chromatography. In addition to monodispersity, these materials have very large surface areas as well as uniform, tunable, and highly ordered pore structures, which makes mesoporous silica uniquely attractive for these applications.

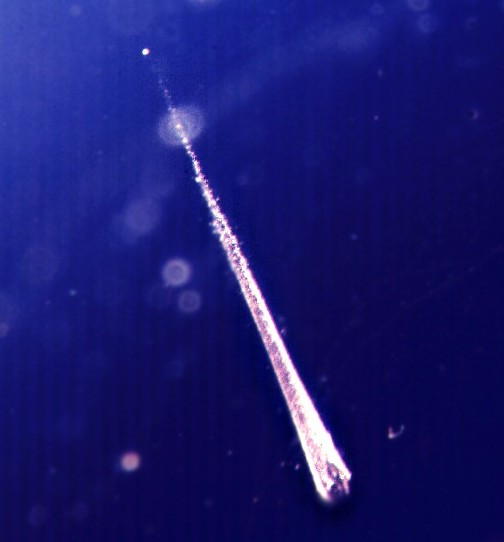
A 10 μm meteoroid particle captured by the EURECA spacecraft launched by STS-46 in a block of aerogel

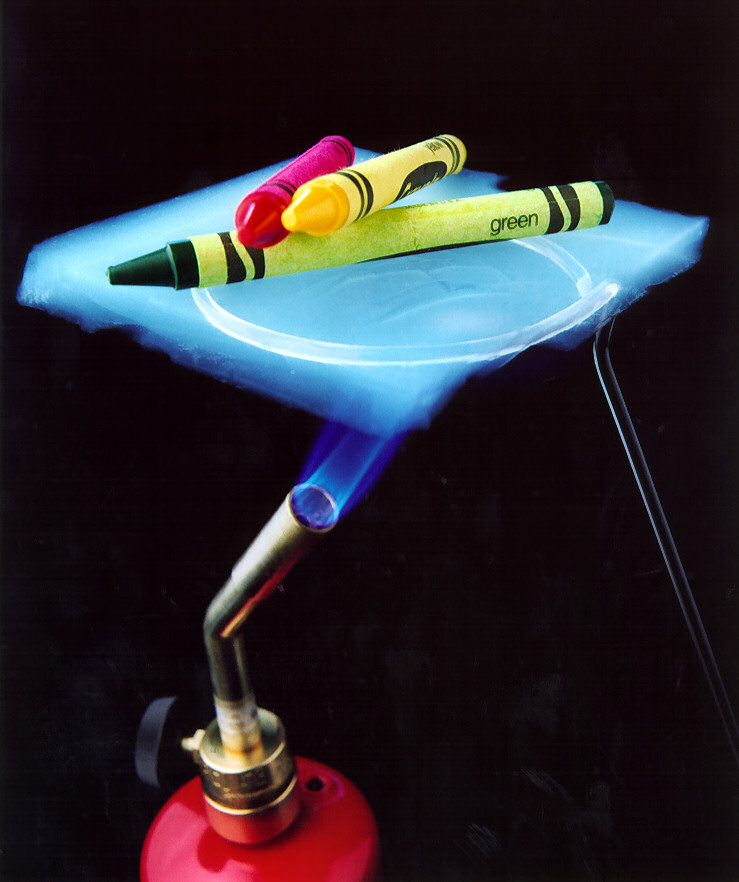
This NASA silica aerogel is a thermal insulator that is sufficiently insulating to protect crayons from a Bunsen burner flame.

=== Aerogels ===
Aerogels are highly porous ultralight materials in which the liquid component of a gel has been replaced with a gas, and are noteworthy for being solids that are extremely effective thermal insulators with very low density. Aerogels can be prepared in a variety of ways, and though most have been based on silica, materials based on zirconia, titania, cellulose, polyurethane, and resorcinol—formaldehyde systems, amongst others, have been reported and explored. The prime disadvantage of a silica-based aerogel is its fragility, though NASA has used them for insulation on Mars rovers, the Mars Pathfinder and they have been used commercially for insulating blankets and between glass panes for translucent day-lighting panels. Particulate gels prepared by the Stöber process can be dehydrated rapidly to produce highly effective silica aerogels, as well as xerogels. They key step is the use of supercritical fluid extraction to remove water from the gel while maintaining the gel structure, which is typically done with supercritical carbon dioxide, as NASA does. The resulting aerogels are very effective thermal insulators because of their high porosity with very small pores (in the nanometre range). Conduction of heat through the gas phase is poor, and as the structure greatly inhibits movement of air molecules through the structure, heat transfer through the material is poor, as can be seen in the image at right where heat from a Bunsen burner transfers so poorly that crayons resting on the aerogel do not melt. Due to their low density, aerogels have also been used to capture interstellar dust particles with minimal heat changes in slowing them down (to prevent heat-induced changes in the particles) as part of the Stardust mission.

One method to produce a silica aerogel uses a modified Stöber process and supercritical drying. The product appears translucent with a blue tinge as a consequence of Rayleigh scattering; when placed in front of a light source, the transmitted light becomes yellowish because the blue one has been scattered. This aerogel has a surface area of 700 m^{2}⋅g^{−1} and a density of 0.040 g⋅cm^{−3}; by way of contrast, the density of air is 0.0012 g⋅cm^{−3} (at 15 °C and 1 atm).

Silica aerogels held 15 entries for materials properties in the Guinness World Records in 2011, including for best insulator and lowest-density solid, though aerographite took the latter title in 2012.

Aerographene, with a density of just 13% of that of room temperature air and less dense than helium gas, became the lowest-density solid yet developed in 2013. Stöber-like methods have been applied in the preparation of aerogels in non-silica systems. NASA has developed silica aerogels with a polymer coating to reinforce the structure, producing a material roughly two orders of magnitude stronger for the same density, and also polymer aerogels, which are flexible and can be formed into a bendable thin film.

=== Colloidal silica ===
Colloidal silica is widely used in metal casting.

=== Synthetic opals ===
Stöber process may be used to produce spherical particles to grow lustrous opal mineraloids. (Note: At least two researches have reported.)
