= Fog bank =

Fog bank may refer to:

- Fog, water droplets suspended in air, especially when localized
- FOGBANK, a code name given to a material used in nuclear weapons
