= Sol–gel process =

Method for producing solid materials from small molecules

In materials science, the sol–gel process is a method for producing solid materials from small molecules. The method is used for the fabrication of metal oxides, especially the oxides of silicon (Si) and titanium (Ti). The process involves conversion of monomers or oligomers in solution into a colloidal solution (sol) that acts as the precursor for an integrated network (or gel) of either discrete particles or network polymers. Typical precursors are metal alkoxides. Sol–gel process is used to produce ceramic nanoparticles.

== Stages ==
Schematic representation of the different stages and routes of the sol–gel technology

In this chemical procedure, a "sol" (a colloidal solution) is formed that then gradually evolves towards the formation of a gel-like diphasic system containing both a liquid phase and solid phase whose morphologies range from discrete particles to continuous polymer networks. In the case of the colloid, the volume fraction of particles (or particle density) may be so low that a significant amount of fluid may need to be removed initially for the gel-like properties to be recognized. This can be accomplished in any number of ways. The simplest method is to allow time for sedimentation to occur, and then pour off the remaining liquid. Centrifugation can also be used to accelerate the process of phase separation.

Removal of the remaining liquid (solvent) phase requires a drying process, which is typically accompanied by a significant amount of shrinkage and densification. The rate at which the solvent can be removed is ultimately determined by the distribution of porosity in the gel. The ultimate microstructure of the final component will clearly be strongly influenced by changes imposed upon the structural template during this phase of processing.

Afterwards, a thermal treatment, or firing process, is often necessary in order to favor further polycondensation and enhance mechanical properties and structural stability via final sintering, densification, and grain growth. One of the distinct advantages of using this methodology as opposed to the more traditional processing techniques is that densification is often achieved at a much lower temperature.

The precursor sol can be either deposited on a substrate to form a film (e.g., by dip-coating or spin coating), cast into a suitable container with the desired shape (e.g., to obtain monolithic ceramics, glasses, fibers, membranes, aerogels), or used to synthesize powders (e.g., microspheres, nanospheres). The sol–gel approach is a cheap and low-temperature technique that allows the fine control of the product's chemical composition. Even small quantities of dopants, such as organic dyes and rare-earth elements, can be introduced in the sol and end up uniformly dispersed in the final product. It can be used in ceramics processing and manufacturing as an investment casting material, or as a means of producing very thin films of metal oxides for various purposes. Sol–gel derived materials have diverse applications in optics, electronics, energy, space, (bio)sensors, medicine (e.g., controlled drug release), reactive material, and separation (e.g., chromatography) technology.

The interest in sol–gel processing can be traced back in the mid-1800s with the observation that the hydrolysis of tetraethyl orthosilicate (TEOS) under acidic conditions led to the formation of SiO_{2} in the form of fibers and monoliths. Sol–gel research grew to be so important that in the 1990s more than 35,000 papers were published worldwide on the process.

== Particles and polymers ==
The sol–gel process is a wet-chemical technique used for the fabrication of both glassy and ceramic materials. In this process, the sol (or solution) evolves gradually towards the formation of a gel-like network containing both a liquid phase and a solid phase. Typical precursors are metal alkoxides and metal chlorides, which undergo hydrolysis and polycondensation reactions to form a colloid. The basic structure or morphology of the solid phase can range anywhere from discrete colloidal particles to continuous chain-like polymer networks.

The term colloid is used primarily to describe a broad range of solid-liquid (and/or liquid-liquid) mixtures, all of which contain distinct solid (and/or liquid) particles which are dispersed to various degrees in a liquid medium. The term is specific to the size of the individual particles, which are larger than atomic dimensions but small enough to exhibit Brownian motion. If the particles are large enough, then their dynamic behavior in any given period of time in suspension would be governed by forces of gravity and sedimentation. But if they are small enough to be colloids, then their irregular motion in suspension can be attributed to the collective bombardment of a myriad of thermally agitated molecules in the liquid suspending medium, as described originally by Albert Einstein in his dissertation. Einstein concluded that this erratic behavior could adequately be described using the theory of Brownian motion, with sedimentation being a possible long-term result. This critical size range (or particle diameter) typically ranges from tens of angstroms (10^{−10} m) to a few micrometres (10^{−6} m).

- Under certain chemical conditions (typically in base-catalyzed sols), the particles may grow to sufficient size to become colloids, which are affected both by sedimentation and forces of gravity. Stabilized suspensions of such sub-micrometre spherical particles may eventually result in their self-assembly—yielding highly ordered microstructures reminiscent of the prototype colloidal crystal: precious opal.
- Under certain chemical conditions (typically in acid-catalyzed sols), the interparticle forces have sufficient strength to cause considerable aggregation and/or flocculation prior to their growth. The formation of a more open continuous network of low density polymers exhibits certain advantages with regard to physical properties in the formation of high performance glass and glass/ceramic components in 2 and 3 dimensions.

In either case (discrete particles or continuous polymer network) the sol evolves then towards the formation of an inorganic network containing a liquid phase (gel). Formation of a metal oxide involves connecting the metal centers with oxo (M-O-M) or hydroxo (M-OH-M) bridges, therefore generating metal-oxo or metal-hydroxo polymers in solution.

In both cases (discrete particles or continuous polymer network), the drying process serves to remove the liquid phase from the gel, yielding a micro-porous amorphous glass or micro-crystalline ceramic. Subsequent thermal treatment (firing) may be performed in order to favor further polycondensation and enhance mechanical properties.

With the viscosity of a sol adjusted into a proper range, both optical quality glass fiber and refractory ceramic fiber can be drawn which are used for fiber optic sensors and thermal insulation, respectively. In addition, uniform ceramic powders of a wide range of chemical composition can be formed by precipitation.

== Polymerization ==
Simplified representation of the condensation induced by hydrolysis of TEOS

The Stöber process is a well-studied example of polymerization of an alkoxide, specifically TEOS. The chemical formula for TEOS is given by Si(OC_{2}H_{5})_{4}, or Si(OR)_{4}, where the alkyl group R = C_{2}H_{5}. Alkoxides are ideal chemical precursors for sol–gel synthesis because they react readily with water. The reaction is called hydrolysis, because a hydroxyl ion becomes attached to the silicon atom as follows:

Si(OR)_{4} + H_{2}O → HO−Si(OR)_{3} + R−OH

Depending on the amount of water and catalyst present, hydrolysis may proceed to completion to silica:

Si(OR)_{4} + 2 H_{2}O → SiO_{2} + 4 R−OH

Complete hydrolysis often requires an excess of water and/or the use of a hydrolysis catalyst such as acetic acid or hydrochloric acid. Intermediate species including [(OR)_{2}−Si−(OH)_{2}] or [(OR)_{3}−Si−(OH)] may result as products of partial hydrolysis reactions. Early intermediates result from two partially hydrolyzed monomers linked with a siloxane [Si−O−Si] bond:

(OR)_{3}−Si−OH + HO−Si−(OR)_{3} → [(OR)_{3}Si−O−Si(OR)_{3}] + H−O−H

or

(OR)_{3}−Si−OR + HO−Si−(OR)_{3} → [(OR)_{3}Si−O−Si(OR)_{3}] + R−OH

Thus, polymerization is associated with the formation of a 1-, 2-, or 3-dimensional network of siloxane [Si−O−Si] bonds accompanied by the production of H−O−H and R−O−H species.

By definition, condensation liberates a small molecule, such as water or alcohol. This type of reaction can continue to build larger and larger silicon-containing molecules by the process of polymerization. Thus, a polymer is a huge molecule (or macromolecule) formed from hundreds or thousands of units called monomers. The number of bonds that a monomer can form is called its functionality. Polymerization of silicon alkoxide, for instance, can lead to complex branching of the polymer, because a fully hydrolyzed monomer Si(OH)_{4} is tetrafunctional (can branch or bond in 4 different directions). Alternatively, under certain conditions (e.g., low water concentration) fewer than 4 of the OR or OH groups (ligands) will be capable of condensation, so relatively little branching will occur. The mechanisms of hydrolysis and condensation, and the factors that bias the structure toward linear or branched structures are the most critical issues of sol–gel science and technology. This reaction is favored in both basic and acidic conditions.

== Sono-Ormosil ==
Sonication is an efficient tool for the synthesis of polymers. The cavitational shear forces, which stretch out and break the chain in a non-random process, result in a lowering of the molecular weight and poly-dispersity. Furthermore, multi-phase systems are very efficient dispersed and emulsified, so that very fine mixtures are provided. This means that ultrasound increases the rate of polymerisation over conventional stirring and results in higher molecular weights with lower polydispersities. Ormosils (organically modified silicate) are obtained when silane is added to gel-derived silica during sol–gel process. The product is a molecular-scale composite with improved mechanical properties. Sono-Ormosils are characterized by a higher density than classic gels as well as an improved thermal stability. An explanation therefore might be the increased degree of polymerization.

== Pechini process ==
For single cation systems like SiO_{2} and TiO_{2}, hydrolysis and condensation processes naturally give rise to homogenous compositions. For systems involving multiple cations, such as strontium titanate, SrTiO_{3} and other perovskite systems, the concept of steric immobilisation becomes relevant. To avoid the formation of multiple phases of binary oxides as the result of differing hydrolysis and condensation rates, the entrapment of cations in a polymer network is an effective approach, generally termed the Pechini process. In this process, a chelating agent is used, most often citric acid, to surround aqueous cations and sterically entrap them. Subsequently, a polymer network is formed to immobilize the chelated cations in a gel or resin. This is most often achieved by poly-esterification using ethylene glycol. The resulting polymer is then combusted under oxidising conditions to remove organic content and yield a product oxide with homogeneously dispersed cations.

== Nanomaterials, aerogels, xerogels ==
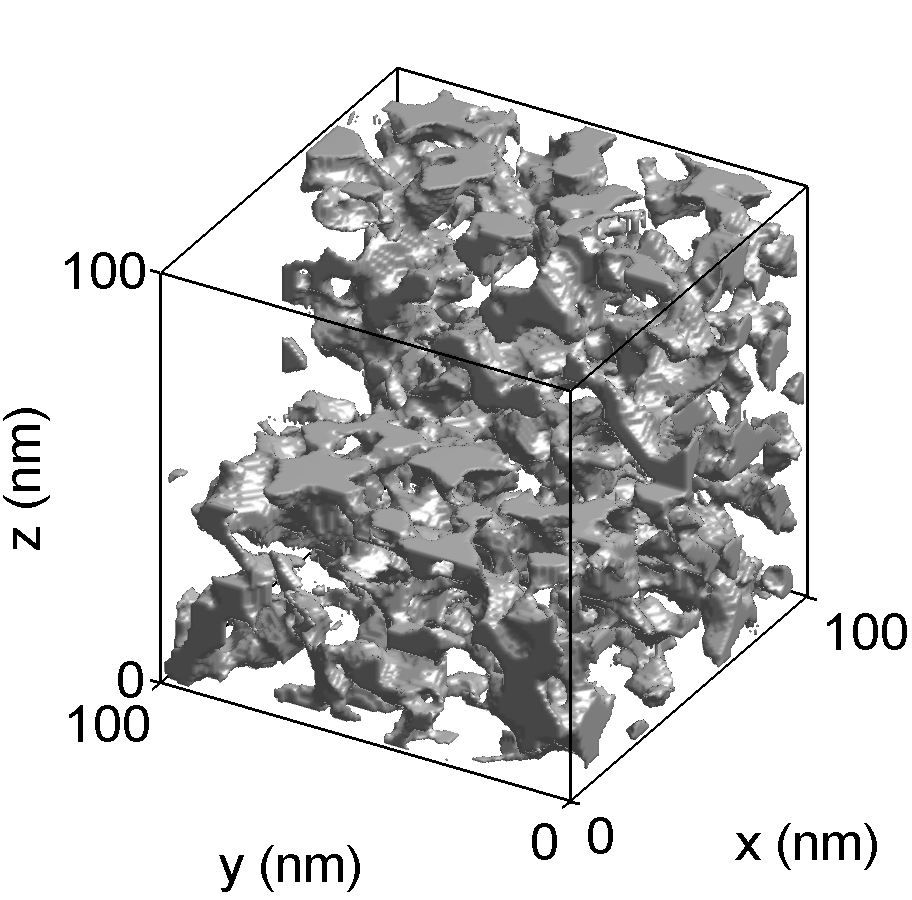
Nanostructure of a resorcinol-formaldehyde gel reconstructed from small-angle X-ray scattering. This type of disordered morphology is typical of many sol–gel materials.

If the liquid in a wet gel is removed under a supercritical condition, a highly porous and extremely low density material called aerogel is obtained. Drying the gel by means of low temperature treatments (25–100 °C), it is possible to obtain porous solid matrices called xerogels. In addition, a sol–gel process was developed in the 1950s for the production of radioactive powders of UO_{2} and ThO_{2} for nuclear fuels, without generation of large quantities of dust.

Differential stresses that develop as a result of non-uniform drying shrinkage are directly related to the rate at which the solvent can be removed, and thus highly dependent upon the distribution of porosity. Such stresses have been associated with a plastic-to-brittle transition in consolidated bodies, and can yield to crack propagation in the unfired body if not relieved.

In addition, any fluctuations in packing density in the compact as it is prepared for the kiln are often amplified during the sintering process, yielding heterogeneous densification. Some pores and other structural defects associated with density variations have been shown to play a detrimental role in the sintering process by growing and thus limiting end-point densities. Differential stresses arising from heterogeneous densification have also been shown to result in the propagation of internal cracks, thus becoming the strength-controlling flaws.

It would therefore appear desirable to process a material in such a way that it is physically uniform with regard to the distribution of components and porosity, rather than using particle size distributions which will maximize the green density. The containment of a uniformly dispersed assembly of strongly interacting particles in suspension requires total control over particle-particle interactions. Monodisperse colloids provide this potential.

Monodisperse powders of colloidal silica, for example, may therefore be stabilized sufficiently to ensure a high degree of order in the colloidal crystal or polycrystalline colloidal solid which results from aggregation. The degree of order appears to be limited by the time and space allowed for longer-range correlations to be established. Such defective polycrystalline structures would appear to be the basic elements of nanoscale materials science, and, therefore, provide the first step in developing a more rigorous understanding of the mechanisms involved in microstructural evolution in inorganic systems such as sintered ceramic nanomaterials.

Ultra-fine and uniform ceramic powders can be formed by precipitation. These powders of single and multiple component compositions can be produced at a nanoscale particle size for dental, biomedical, agrochemical, or catalytic applications. Powder abrasives, used in a variety of finishing operations, are made using a sol–gel type process. One of the more important applications of sol–gel processing is to carry out zeolite synthesis. Other elements (metals, metal oxides) can be easily incorporated into the final product and the silicate sol formed by this method is very stable. Semi-stable metal complexes can be used to produce sub-2 nm oxide particles without thermal treatment. During base-catalyzed synthesis, hydroxo (M-OH) bonds may be avoided in favor of oxo (M-O-M) using a ligand which is strong enough to prevent reaction in the hydroxo regime but weak enough to allow reaction in the oxo regime (see Pourbaix diagram).

== Applications ==
The applications for sol gel-derived products are numerous. For example, scientists have used it to produce the world's lightest materials and also some of its toughest ceramics.

=== Protective coatings ===
One of the largest application areas is thin films, which can be produced on a piece of substrate by spin coating or dip-coating. Protective and decorative coatings, and electro-optic components can be applied to glass, metal and other types of substrates with these methods. Cast into a mold, and with further drying and heat-treatment, dense ceramic or glass articles with novel properties can be formed that cannot be created by any other method. Other coating methods include spraying, electrophoresis, inkjet printing, or roll coating.

=== Thin films and fibers ===
With the viscosity of a sol adjusted into a proper range, both optical and refractory ceramic fibers can be drawn which are used for fiber optic sensors and thermal insulation, respectively. Thus, many ceramic materials, both glassy and crystalline, have found use in various forms from bulk solid-state components to high surface area forms such as thin films, coatings and fibers. Also, thin films have found their application in the electronic field and can be used as sensitive components of a resistive gas sensors.

=== Controlled release ===
Sol-gel technology has been applied for controlled release of fragrances and drugs. Silica-based sol–gel microencapsulation has been employed to combine tretinoin/benzoyl peroxide in a single formulation while protecting tretinoin from degradation.

=== Opto-mechanical ===
Macroscopic optical elements and active optical components as well as large area hot mirrors, cold mirrors, lenses, and beam splitters can be made by the sol–gel route. In the processing of high performance ceramic nanomaterials with superior opto-mechanical properties under adverse conditions, the size of the crystalline grains is determined largely by the size of the crystalline particles present in the raw material during the synthesis or formation of the object. Thus a reduction of the original particle size well below the wavelength of visible light (~500 nm) eliminates much of the light scattering, resulting in a translucent or even transparent material.

Furthermore, microscopic pores in sintered ceramic nanomaterials, mainly trapped at the junctions of microcrystalline grains, cause light to scatter and prevented true transparency. The total volume fraction of these nanoscale pores (both intergranular and intragranular porosity) must be less than 1% for high-quality optical transmission, i.e. the density has to be 99.99% of the theoretical crystalline density.

== See also ==
- Coacervate, small spheroidal droplet of colloidal particles in suspension
- Freeze-casting
- Freeze gelation
- Mechanics of gelation
- Random graph theory of gelation
- Liquid–liquid extraction
