= Aerogel =

Synthetic ultralight solid

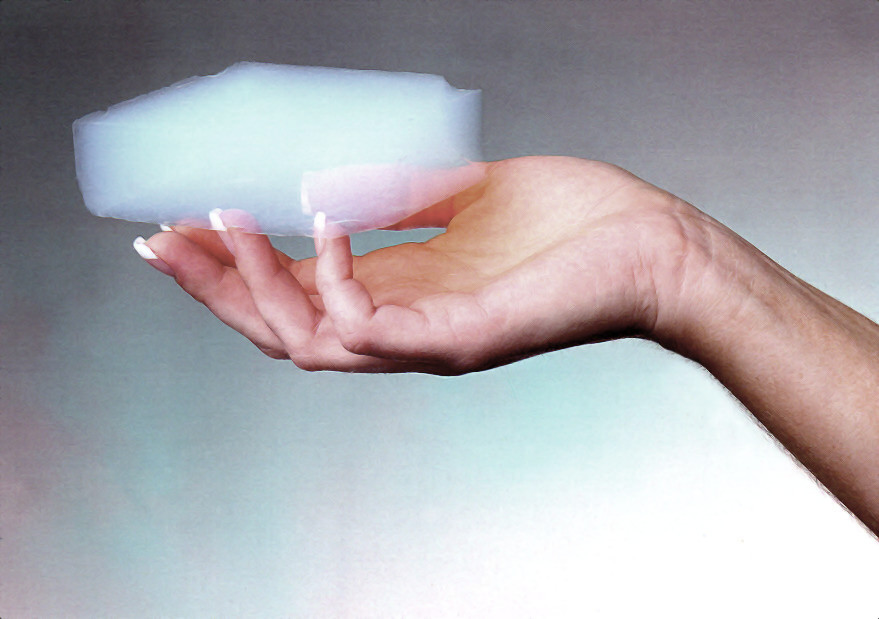
A block of silica aerogel in a hand.

IUPAC definition

aerogel: composed of a microporous solid in which the dispersed phase is a gas. (See Gold Book entry for note.)

Aerogels are a class of synthetic porous ultralight material derived from a gel, in which the liquid component for the gel has been replaced with a gas, without significant collapse of the gel structure. The result is a solid with extremely low density and extremely low thermal conductivity. Aerogels can be made from a variety of chemical compounds. Silica aerogels feel like fragile styrofoam to the touch, while some polymer-based aerogels feel like rigid foams.

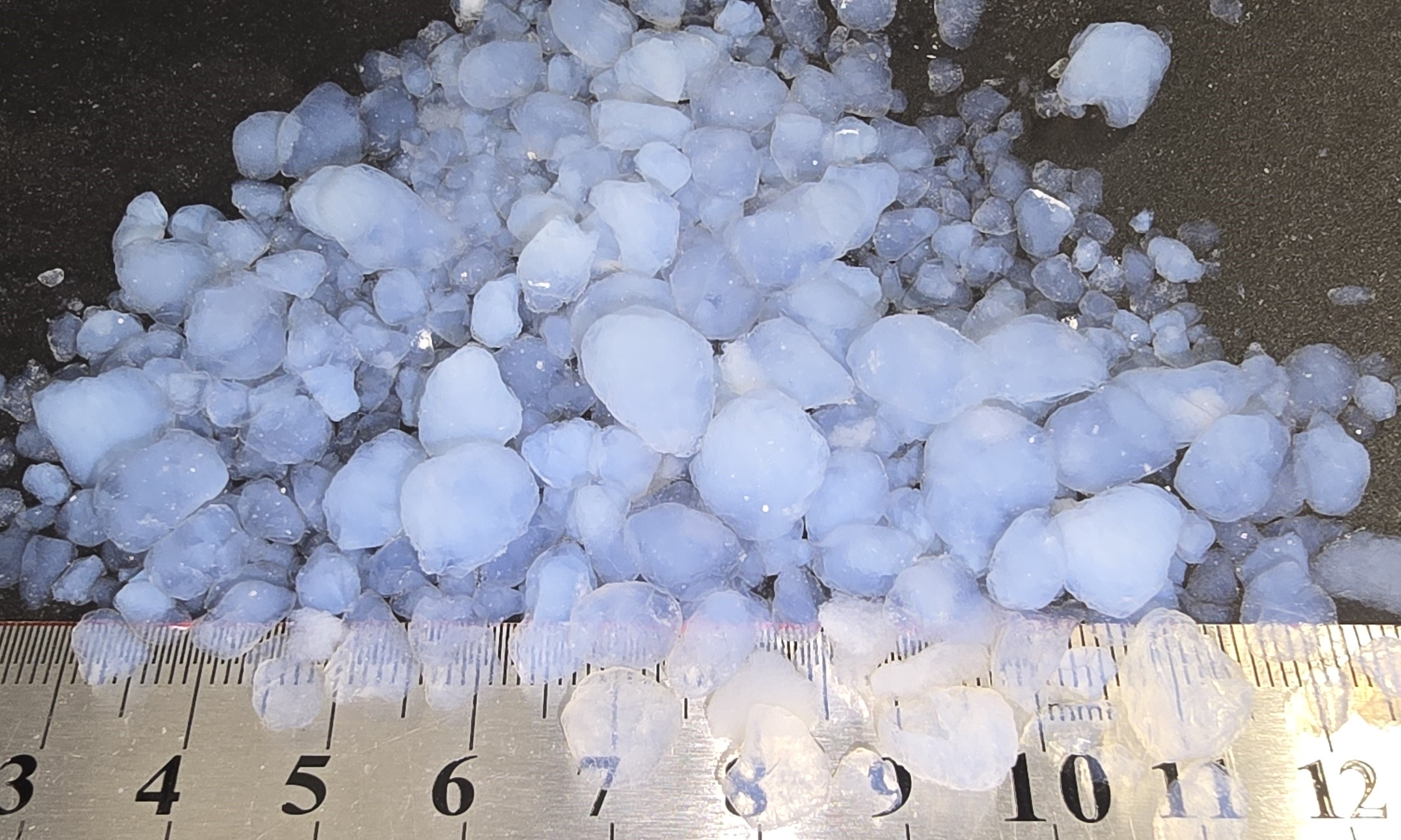
Aerogel crystals produced in ScCO2 drying

Aerogels are produced by extracting the liquid component of a gel through supercritical drying or freeze-drying. This allows the liquid to be slowly dried off without causing the solid matrix in the gel to collapse from capillary action, as would happen with conventional evaporation. The first aerogels were produced from silica gels. Kistler's later work involved aerogels based on alumina, chromia, and tin dioxide. Carbon aerogels were first developed in the late 1980s.

== History ==
The first documented example of an aerogel was created by Samuel Stephens Kistler in 1931, as a result of a bet with Charles Learned over who could replace the liquid in "jellies" with gas without causing shrinkage.

== Properties ==
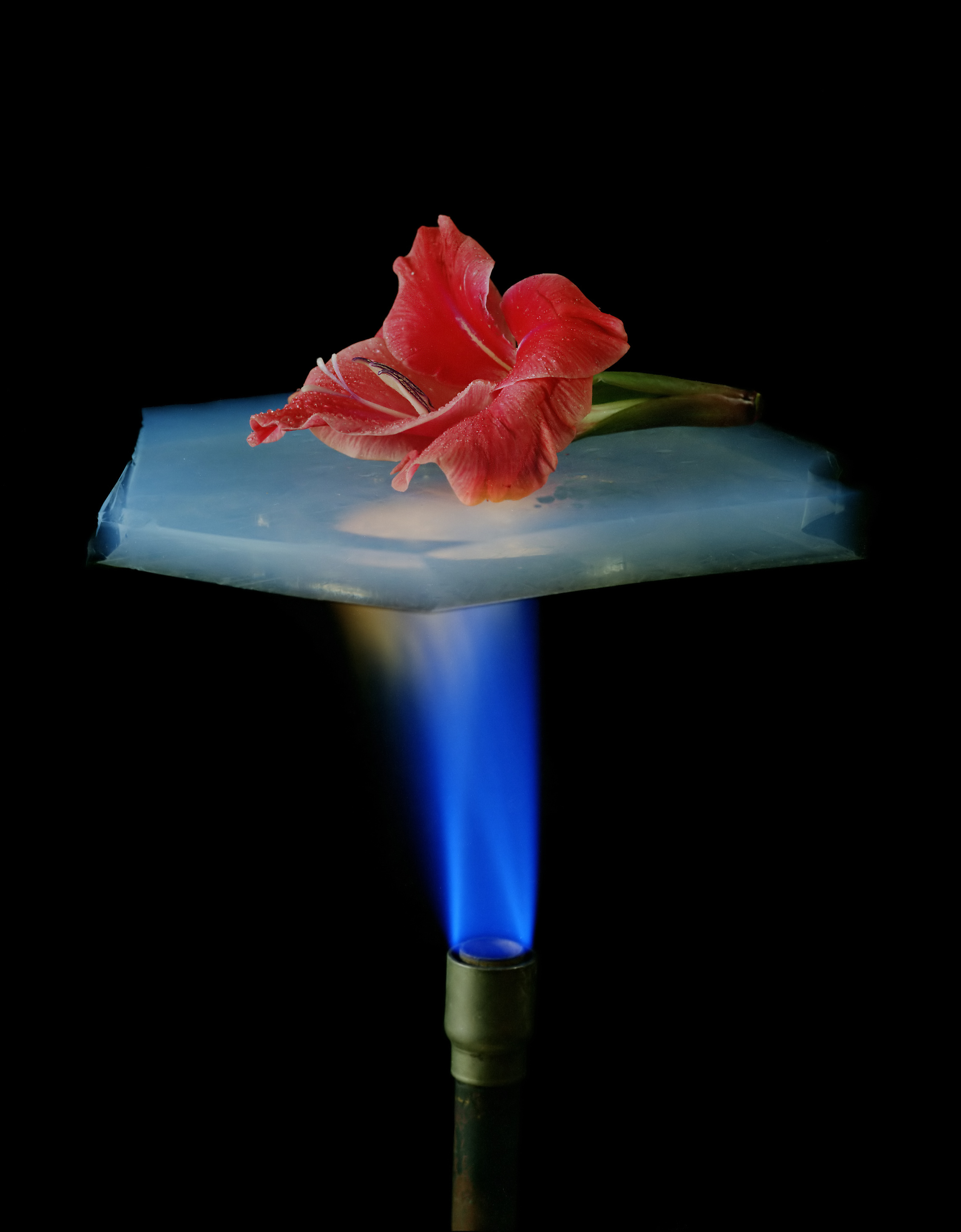
A flower resting on a piece of silica aerogel, which is suspended over a flame from a Bunsen burner. Aerogels have excellent insulating properties, and the flower is protected from the heat of the flame.

Despite the name, aerogels are solid, rigid, and dry materials that do not resemble a gel in their physical properties: the name is because they are made from gels. Pressing softly on an aerogel typically does not leave even a minor mark; pressing more firmly will leave a permanent depression. Pressing extremely firmly will cause a breakdown in the sparse structure causing it to shatter like glass (a property known as friability), although more modern variations do not suffer from this. Even though it is prone to shattering, it is very strong structurally. Its impressive load-bearing abilities are due to the dendritic microstructure in which spherical particles of average size 2–5 nm are fused together into clusters. These clusters form a three-dimensional highly porous structure of almost fractal chains, with pores just under 100 nm. The average size and density of the pores can be controlled during the manufacturing process.

An aerogel material can range from 50% to 99.98% air by volume, but in practice most aerogels exhibit somewhere between 90 and 99.8% porosity. Aerogels have a porous solid network that contains air pockets, with the air pockets taking up the majority of space within the material.

Aerogels are good thermal insulators because they almost nullify two of the three methods of heat transfer – conduction (they are mostly composed of insulating gas) and convection (the microstructure prevents net gas movement). They are good conductive insulators because they are composed almost entirely of gases, which are very poor heat conductors. (Silica aerogel is an especially good insulator because silica is also a poor conductor of heat; a metallic or carbon aerogel, on the other hand, would be less effective.) They are good convective inhibitors because air cannot circulate through the lattice. Aerogels are poor radiative insulators because infrared radiation (which transfers heat) passes through them.

Owing to its hygroscopic nature, aerogel feels dry and acts as a strong desiccant. People handling aerogel for extended periods should wear gloves to prevent the appearance of dry brittle spots on their skin.

The slight color it does have is due to Rayleigh scattering of the shorter wavelengths of visible light by the nano-sized dendritic structure. This causes it to appear smoky blue against dark backgrounds and yellowish against bright backgrounds.

Aerogels by themselves are hydrophilic, and if they absorb moisture they usually suffer a structural change, such as contraction, and deteriorate, but degradation can be prevented by making them hydrophobic, via a chemical treatment. Aerogels with hydrophobic interiors are less susceptible to degradation than aerogels with only an outer hydrophobic layer, especially if a crack penetrates the surface.

=== Structure ===
Aerogel structure results from a sol-gel polymerization, which is when monomers (simple molecules) react with other monomers to form a sol or a substance that consists of bonded, cross-linked macromolecules with deposits of liquid solution among them. When the material is critically heated, the liquid evaporates and the bonded, cross-linked macromolecule frame is left behind. The result of the polymerization and critical heating is the creation of a material that has a porous strong structure classified as aerogel. Variations in synthesis can alter the surface area and pore size of the aerogel. The smaller the pore size the more susceptible the aerogel is to fracture.

=== Porosity of aerogel ===
There are several ways to determine the porosity of aerogel: the three main methods are gas adsorption, mercury porosimetry, and scattering method. In gas adsorption, nitrogen at its boiling point is adsorbed into the aerogel sample. The gas being adsorbed is dependent on the size of the pores within the sample and on the partial pressure of the gas relative to its saturation pressure. The volume of the gas adsorbed is measured by using the Brunauer, Emmit and Teller formula (BET), which gives the specific surface area of the sample. At high partial pressure in the adsorption/desorption the Kelvin equation gives the pore size distribution of the sample. In mercury porosimetry, the mercury is forced into the aerogel porous system to determine the pores' size, but this method is highly inefficient since the solid frame of aerogel will collapse from the high compressive force. The scattering method involves the angle-dependent deflection of radiation within the aerogel sample. The sample can be solid particles or pores. The radiation goes into the material and determines the fractal geometry of the aerogel pore network. The best radiation wavelengths to use are X-rays and neutrons. Aerogel is also an open porous network: the difference between an open porous network and a closed porous network is that in the open network, gases can enter and leave the substance without any limitation, while a closed porous network traps the gases within the material forcing them to stay within the pores. The high porosity and surface area of silica aerogels allow them to be used in a variety of environmental filtration applications.

=== Knudsen effect ===
Aerogels may have a thermal conductivity smaller than that of the gas they contain. This is caused by the Knudsen effect, a reduction of thermal conductivity in gases when the size of the cavity encompassing the gas becomes comparable to the mean free path. Effectively, the cavity restricts the movement of the gas particles, decreasing the thermal conductivity in addition to eliminating convection. For example, thermal conductivity of air is about 25 mW·m^{−1}·K^{−1} at standard temperature and pressure (STP) and in a large container, but decreases to about 5 mW·m^{−1}·K^{−1} in a pore 30 nanometers in diameter.

=== Waterproofing ===
Aerogel contains particles that are 2–5 nm in diameter. After the process of creating aerogel, it will contain a large amount of hydroxyl groups on the surface. The hydroxyl groups can cause a strong reaction when the aerogel is placed in water, causing it to dissolve in the water. One way to waterproof the hydrophilic aerogel is by soaking the aerogel with some chemical base that will replace the surface hydroxyl groups (–OH) with non-polar groups (–OR), a process which is most effective when R is an aliphatic group.

== Production ==
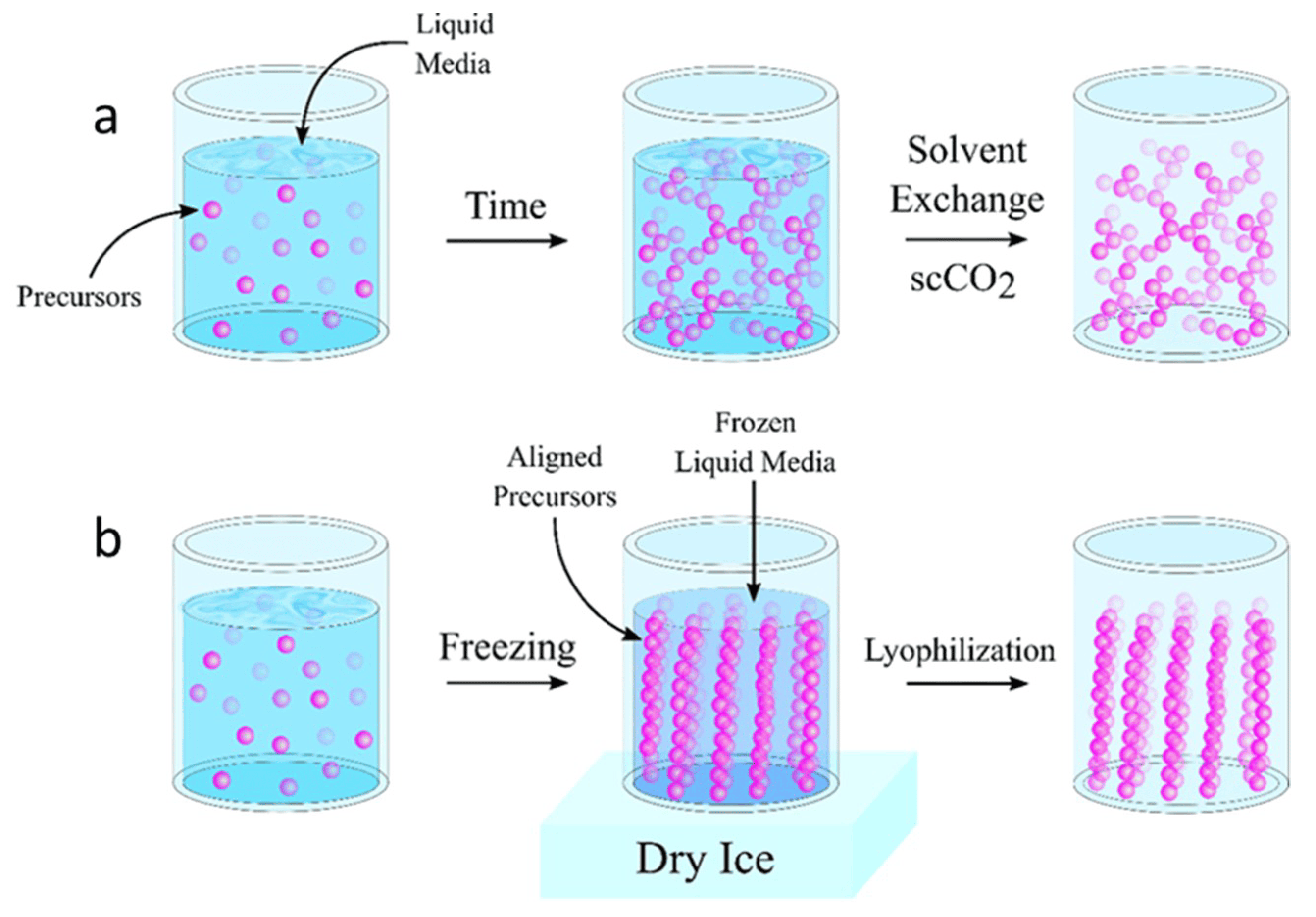
Comparison of aerogel fabrication strategies showing typical transitions into an aerogel: (a) the supercritical drying process where precursor materials undergo gelation prior to supercritical drying. (b) A standard freeze-drying technique where an aqueous solution is frozen.

A typical phase diagram for pure compounds. Two methods are shown for the gel to aerogel transition: The solid-gas transition (during freeze-drying) and the transition from a liquid to gas during supercritical drying.

The preparation of silica aerogels typically involves three distinct steps: the sol-gel transition (gelation), the network perfection (aging), and the gel-aerogel transition (drying).

=== Gelation ===
Silica aerogels are typically synthesized by using a sol-gel process. The first step of the sol-gel process is the creation of a colloidal suspension of solid particles known as a "sol". The precursors are a liquid alcohol such as ethanol which is mixed with a silicon alkoxide, such as tetramethoxysilane (TMOS), tetraethoxysilane (TEOS), and polyethoxydisiloxane (PEDS) (earlier work used sodium silicates). The solution of silica is mixed with a catalyst and allowed to gel during a hydrolysis reaction which forms particles of silicon dioxide. The oxide suspension begins to undergo condensation reactions which result in the creation of metal oxide bridges (either M–O–M, "oxo" bridges, or M–OH–M, "ol" bridges) linking the dispersed colloidal particles. These reactions generally have moderately slow reaction rates, and as a result either acidic or basic catalysts are used to improve the processing speed. Basic catalysts tend to produce more transparent aerogels and minimize the shrinkage during the drying process and also strengthen it to prevent pore collapse during drying.

For some materials, the transition from a colloidal dispersion into a gel happens without the addition of crosslinking materials. For others, crosslinking materials are added to the dispersion to promote the strong interaction of the solid particles in order to form the gel. The gelation time depends heavily on a variety of factors such as the chemical composition of the precursor solution, the concentration of the precursor materials and additives, the processing temperature, and the pH. Many materials may require additional curing after gelation (i.e., network perfection) in order to strengthen the aerogel network.

=== Drying ===
Once the gelation is completed, the liquid surrounding the silica network is carefully removed and replaced with air, while keeping the aerogel intact. It is crucial that the gel is dried in such a way as to minimize the surface tension within the pores of the solid network. This is typically accomplished through supercritical fluid extraction using supercritical carbon dioxide (scCO_{2}) or freeze-drying.This section briefly describes and compares the processing strategies of supercritical drying and freeze-drying.

Gels where the liquid is allowed to evaporate at a natural rate are known as xerogels (i. e. are not aerogels). As the liquid evaporates in such manner, forces caused by surface tensions of the liquid-solid interfaces are enough to destroy the fragile gel network. As a result, xerogels cannot achieve the high porosities and instead peak at lower porosities and exhibit large amounts of shrinkage after drying. To avoid the collapse of fibers during slow solvent evaporation and reduce surface tensions of the liquid-solid interfaces, aerogels can be formed by lyophilization (freeze-drying). Depending on the concentration of the fibers and the temperature to freeze the material, the properties such as porosity of the final aerogel will be affected.

In 1931, to develop the first aerogels, Kistler used a process known as supercritical drying which avoids a direct phase change. By increasing the temperature and pressure he forced the liquid into a supercritical fluid state where by dropping the pressure he could instantly gasify and remove the liquid inside the aerogel, avoiding damage to the delicate three-dimensional network. While this can be done with ethanol, the high temperatures and pressures lead to dangerous processing conditions. A safer, lower temperature and pressure method involves a solvent exchange. This is typically done by exchanging the initial aqueous pore liquid for a CO_{2}-miscible liquid such as ethanol or acetone, then onto liquid carbon dioxide, and then bringing the carbon dioxide above its critical point. A variant on this process involves the direct injection of supercritical carbon dioxide into the pressure vessel containing the aerogel. The result of either process exchanges the initial liquid from the gel with carbon dioxide, without allowing the gel structure to collapse or lose volume.

==== Supercritical drying ====
To dry the gel, while preserving the highly porous network of an aerogel, supercritical drying employs the use of the liquid-gas transition that occurs beyond the critical point of a substance. By using this liquid-gas transition that avoids crossing the liquid-gas phase boundary, the surface tension that would arise within the pores due to the evaporation of a liquid is eliminated, thereby preventing the collapse of the pores. Through heating and pressurization, the liquid solvent reaches its critical point, at which point the liquid and gas phases become indistinguishable. Past this point, the supercritical fluid is converted into the gaseous phase upon an isothermal de-pressurization. This process results in a phase change without crossing the liquid-gas phase boundary. This method is proven to be excellent at preserving the highly porous nature of the solid network without significant shrinkage or cracking. While other fluids have been reported for the creation of supercritically dried aerogels, scCO_{2} is the most common substance with a relatively mild supercritical point at 31 °C and 7.4 MPa. CO_{2} is also relatively non-toxic, non-flammable, inert, and cost-effective when compared to other fluids, such as methanol or ethanol. While being a highly effective method for producing aerogels, supercritical drying takes several days, requires specialized equipment, and presents significant safety hazards due to its high-pressure operation.

==== Freeze-drying ====
Freeze-drying, also known as freeze-casting or ice-templating, offers an alternative to the high temperature and high-pressure requirements of supercritical drying. Additionally, freeze-drying offers more control of the solid structure development by controlling the ice crystal growth during freezing. In this method, a colloidal dispersion of the aerogel precursors is frozen, with the liquid component freezing into different morphologies depending on a variety of factors such as the precursor concentration, type of liquid, temperature of freezing, and freezing container. As this liquid freezes, the solid precursor molecules are forced into the spaces between the growing crystals. Once completely frozen, the frozen liquid is sublimed into a gas through lyophilization, which removes much of the capillary forces, as was observed in supercritical drying. Though typically classified as a "cryogel", aerogels produced through freeze-drying often experience some shrinkage and cracking while also producing a non-homogenous aerogel framework. This often leads to freeze-drying being used for the creation of aerogel powders or as a framework for composite aerogels.

=== Preparation of non-silica aerogels ===
Resorcinol–formaldehyde aerogel (RF aerogel) is made in a way similar to production of silica aerogel. A carbon aerogel can then be made from this resorcinol–formaldehyde aerogel by pyrolysis in an inert gas atmosphere, leaving a matrix of carbon. The resulting carbon aerogel may be used to produce solid shapes, powders, or composite paper. Additives have been successful in enhancing certain properties of the aerogel for the use of specific applications. Aerogel composites have been made using a variety of continuous and discontinuous reinforcements. The high aspect ratio of fibers such as fiberglass have been used to reinforce aerogel composites with significantly improved mechanical properties.

== Materials ==
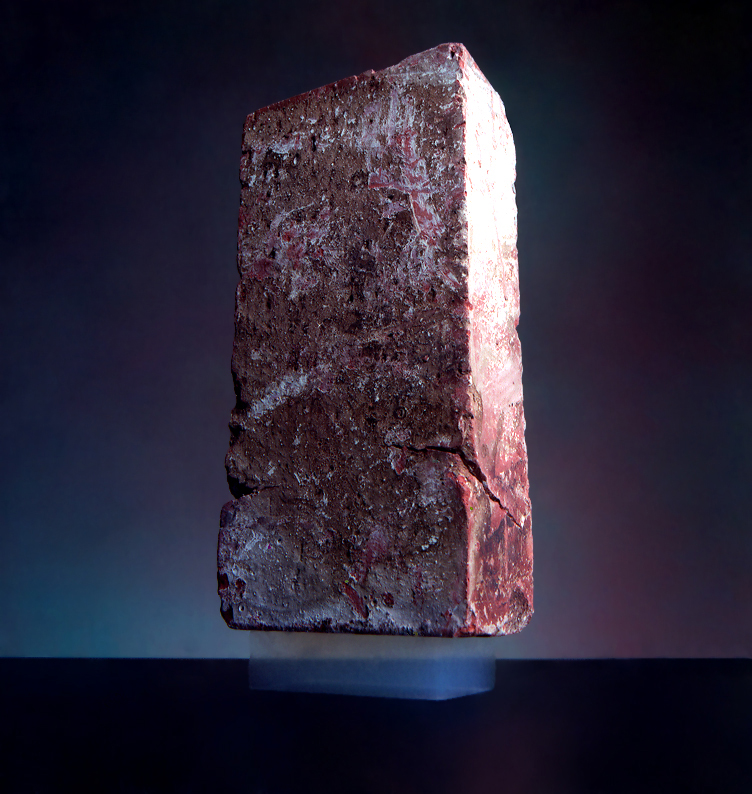
A 2.5 kg brick is supported by a piece of aerogel with a mass of 2 g.

=== Silica aerogel ===
Silica aerogels are the most common type of aerogel, and the primary type in use or study. It is silica-based and can be derived from silica gel or by a modified Stöber process. Nicknames include frozen smoke, solid smoke, solid air, solid cloud, and blue smoke, owing to its translucent nature and the way light scatters in the material. The lowest-density silica nanofoam weighs 1,000 g/m^{3}, which is the evacuated version of the record-aerogel of 1,900 g/m^{3}. The density of air is 1,200 g/m^{3} (at 20 °C and 1 atm).

The silica solidifies into three-dimensional, intertwined clusters that make up only 3% of the volume. Conduction through the solid is therefore very low. The remaining 97% of the volume is composed of air in extremely small nanopores. The air has little room to move, inhibiting both convection and gas-phase conduction.

Silica aerogel also has a high optical transmission of ~99% and a low refractive index of ~1.05. It is very robust with respect to high power input beam in continuous wave regime and does not show any boiling or melting phenomena. This property permits to study high intensity nonlinear waves in the presence of disorder in regimes typically unaccessible by liquid materials, making it promising material for nonlinear optics.

This aerogel has remarkable thermal insulative properties, although its thermal conductivity depends on formulation, density, pressure and measurement method. In one transient hot-wire study of monolithic silica aerogel, Cohen and Glicksman reported that the thermal conductivity decreased from 9.3 mW·m^{−1}·K^{−1} (0.0093 W·m^{−1}·K^{−1}) at 1 atm to 3.2 mW·m^{−1}·K^{−1} (0.0032 W·m^{−1}·K^{−1}) at 0.1 atm; the same aerogel in granular form had a thermal conductivity of 15.0 mW·m^{−1}·K^{−1} at ambient gas pressure under modest compression. Its melting point is 1,473 K (1,200 °C; 2,192 °F).

Until 2011, silica aerogel held 15 entries in Guinness World Records for material properties, including best insulator and lowest-density solid, though it was ousted from the latter title by the even lighter materials aerographite in 2012 and then aerographene in 2013.

=== Carbon ===
Carbon aerogels are composed of particles with sizes in the nanometer range, covalently bonded together. They have very high porosity (over 50%, with pore diameter under 100 nm) and surface areas ranging between 400 and 1,000 m^{2}/g. They are often manufactured as composite paper: non-woven paper made of carbon fibers, impregnated with resorcinol–formaldehyde aerogel, and pyrolyzed. Depending on the density, carbon aerogels may be electrically conductive, making composite aerogel paper useful for electrodes in capacitors or deionization electrodes. Due to their extremely high surface area, carbon aerogels are used to create supercapacitors, with values ranging up to thousands of farads based on a capacitance density of 104 F/g and 77 F/cm^{3}. Carbon aerogels are also extremely "black" in the infrared spectrum, reflecting only 0.3% of radiation between 250 nm and 14.3 μm, making them efficient for solar energy collectors.

The term "aerogel" to describe airy masses of carbon nanotubes produced through certain chemical vapor deposition techniques is incorrect. Such materials can be spun into fibers with strength greater than Kevlar, and unique electrical properties. These materials are not aerogels, however, since they do not have a monolithic internal structure and do not have the regular pore structure characteristic of aerogels.

=== Metal oxide ===
Metal oxide aerogels are used as catalysts in various chemical reactions/transformations or as precursors for other materials.

Aerogels made with aluminium oxide are known as alumina aerogels. These aerogels are used as catalysts, especially when "doped" with a metal other than aluminium. Nickel–alumina aerogel is the most common combination. Alumina aerogels are also being considered by NASA for capturing hypervelocity particles; a formulation doped with gadolinium and terbium could fluoresce at the particle impact site, with the amount of fluorescence dependent on impact energy.

One of the most notable differences between silica aerogels and metal oxide aerogel is that metal oxide aerogels are often variedly colored.

Aerogel	Color
Silica, alumina, titania, zirconia	Clear with Rayleigh scattering blue or white
Iron oxide	Rust red or yellow, opaque
Chromia	Deep green or deep blue, opaque
Vanadia	Olive green, opaque
Neodymium oxide	Purple, transparent
Samaria	Yellow, transparent
Holmia, erbia	Pink, transparent

=== Other ===
Organic polymers can be used to create aerogels. SEAgel is made of agar. Cellulose from plants can be used to create a flexible aerogel.

GraPhage13 is the first graphene-based aerogel assembled using graphene oxide and the M13 bacteriophage.

Chalcogel is an aerogel made of chalcogens (the column of elements on the periodic table beginning with oxygen) such as sulfur, selenium, and other elements. Metals less expensive than platinum have been used in its creation.

Aerogels made of cadmium selenide quantum dots in a porous 3-D network have been developed for use in the semiconductor industry.

Aerogel performance may be augmented for a specific application by the addition of dopants, reinforcing structures, and hybridizing compounds. For example, Spaceloft is a composite of aerogel with some kind of fibrous batting.

Amyloid fibrils from food waste (whey) have the potential for use in AF aerogels for gold extraction from e-waste. Their use would have a less environmental impact than that of the conventional use of activated carbon as adsorbent.

== Applications ==
Aerogels are used in a wide range of applications because of their low density, low thermal conductivity, and high surface area. Silica aerogels were the first to be developed commercially and remain the most widely used type.

Flexible polymer-based aerogels have been developed to overcome the brittleness of traditional silica aerogels and enable thin, mechanically compliant insulating materials for aerospace and electronic systems. Polyimide aerogel films derived from NASA-developed aerogel technology have been commercialized for such applications; examples include the polyimide aerogel film AeroZero.

- Aircraft de-icing: An 80 grams (2.8 oz) carbon nanotube aerogel could cover the wings of a jumbo jet. Aerogel heaters could operate continuously at low power, preventing ice from forming.
- Catalyst or catalyst carrier.
- Chemical adsorber: Silica aerogels have high surface area, porosity, and are ultrahydrophobic. They may be used to remove heavy metals, for example in wastewater treatment.
- Cosmic dust capture: NASA used aerogel to trap space dust particles aboard the Stardust spacecraft. The particles vaporize on impact with solids and pass through gases, but can be trapped in aerogels. NASA also used aerogel for thermal insulation for the Mars rovers.
- Drug delivery: Drugs can be adsorbed from supercritical CO_{2} with release rate controlled by varying the aerogel properties.
- Electrochemical double layer supercapacitors. Aerogels' high surface area allow capacitors that are .02-.05% the size of similarly rated electrolytic capacitors.
- Electromagnetic shielding
- Energy absorbers
- Fuel cells: platinum-on-carbon catalysts.
- Imaging devices, optics, and light guides.
- Impedance matchers for transducers, speakers and range finders.
- Inertial Confinement Fusion (ICF) and X-ray laser targets: In ICF, it is used as low-density target materials to create foam targets that aid in simulating the conditions necessary for fusion. Their low-density structure allows for precise control over the fusion fuel, facilitating efficient compression and heating by the laser energy.
- Introducing disorder into superfluid helium-3.
- Organic insulator: valued for their large surface areas
- Radiative cooling: Aerogels can aid in thermal emittance at lower cost and environmental impact than other materials.
- Passive thermal protection: The US Navy evaluated aerogels for use in diver undergarments and by NASA for insulating space suits.
- Radiators in Cherenkov effect detectors: The ACC system of the Belle detector used aerogels in the Belle experiment at KEKB, because of their low index of refraction, filling the gap between gases and liquids, and their transparency and solid state, making them easier to use than cryogenic liquids or compressed gases.
- Sensors
- Sound insulation, on windows or during construction.
- Tennis rackets: Dunlop Sport uses aerogel in some racquets.
- Textiles and other flexible materials: "Commercial manufacture of aerogel 'blankets' began around the year 2000, combining silica aerogel and fibrous reinforcement that turns the brittle aerogel into a durable, flexible material. The mechanical and thermal properties of the product may be varied based upon the choice of reinforcing fibers, the aerogel matrix and opacification additives included in the composite."
- Thermal insulation: fibre-reinforced silica aerogel insulation boards insulation can be about 50% as thick as conventional materials. They are -suited for historic building retrofit,. Aerogel has been added in granular form to skylights for this purpose. Georgia Institute of Technology's 2007 Solar Decathlon House project used an aerogel as an insulator in its translucent roof. Transmission tunnel of the Chevrolet Corvette (C7). CamelBak thermal sport bottle. 45 North uses aerogel to keep hands warm in its Sturmfist 5 cycling gloves.
- Thickening agents in paints and cosmetics.
- Warheads: Fogbank, a material of secret composition used in U.S. thermonuclear warheads, may be an aerogel.
- Waste disposal
- Water purification: Chalcogels can absorb metal pollutants such as mercury, lead, and cadmium. Aerogels can also absorb oil, for example to respond to oil spills. Aerogels can disinfect water. Photothermal aerogels can purify water by accelerating evaporation.
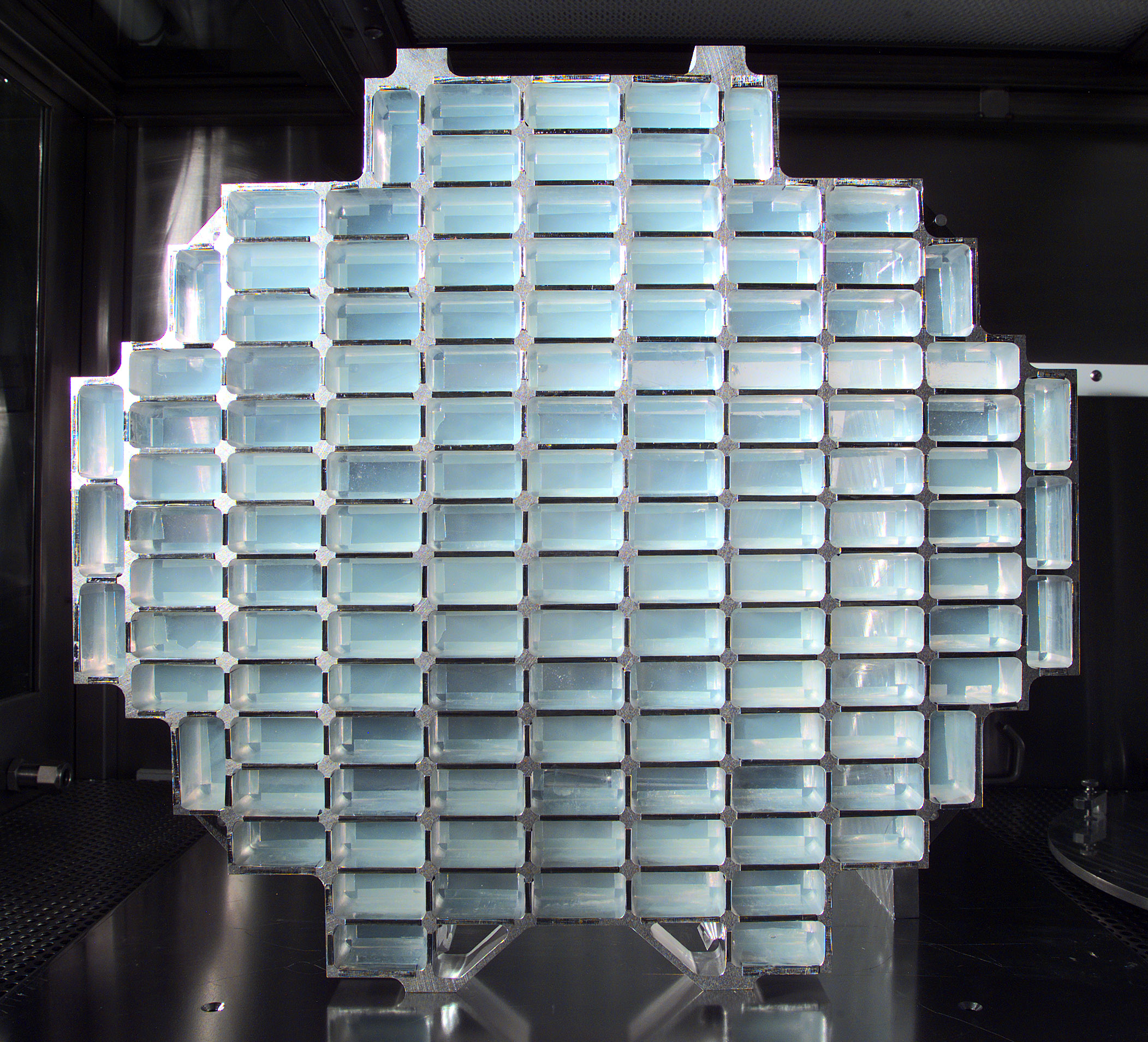
The "Stardust" dust collector with aerogel blocks. (NASA)

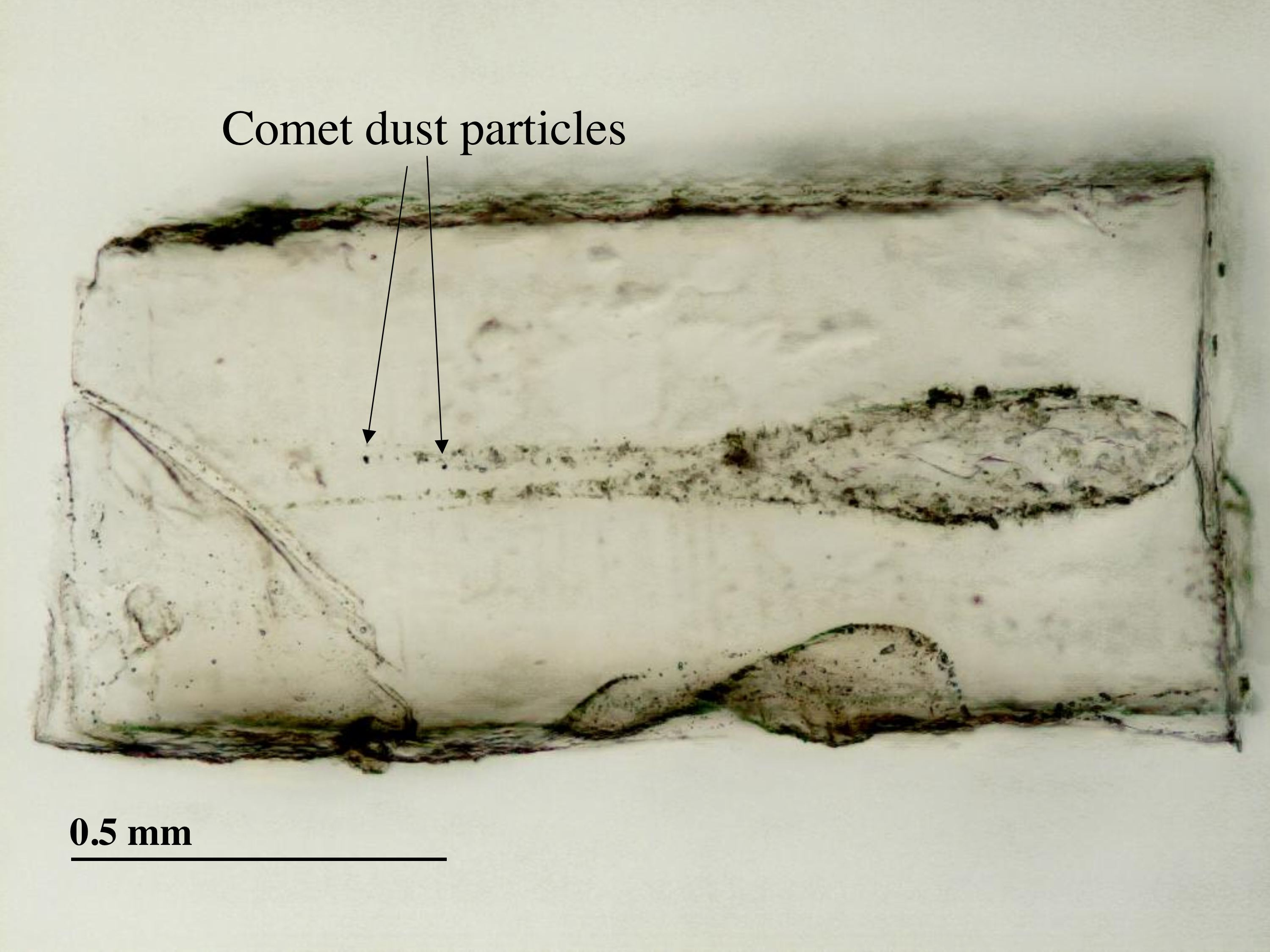
Cosmic dust caught in aerogel blocks from "Stardust". (NASA)

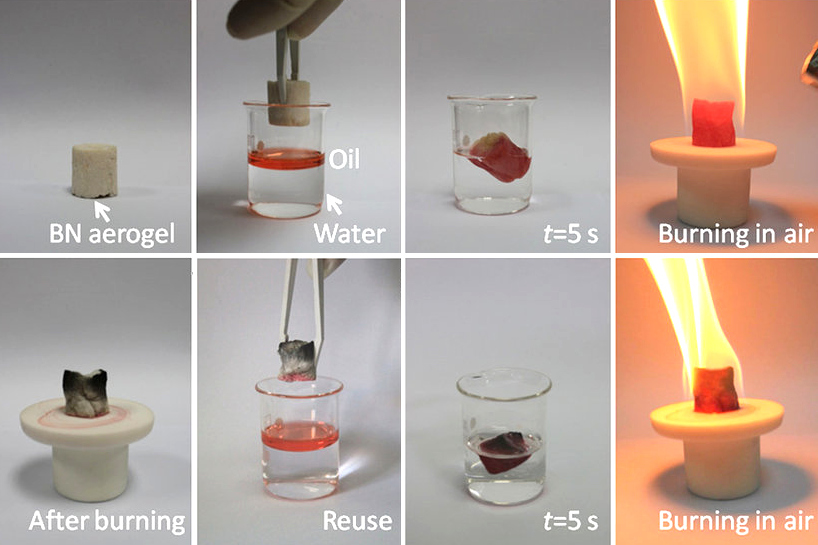
Oil absorption by an aerogel. (Scientific Reports)

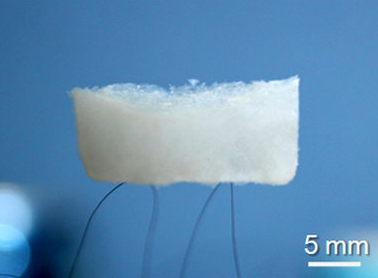
An aerogel held up by hair. (Scientific Reports)

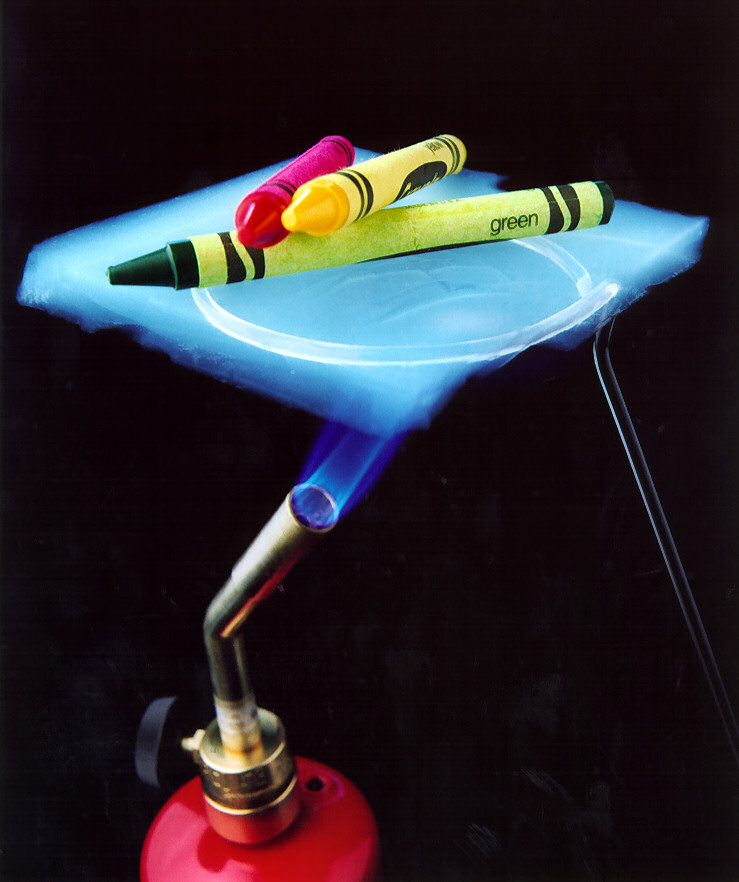
An aerogel holding crayons, with a flame lit underneath, demonstrating its excellent insulation from heat. (NASA)

== Safety ==
Silica-based aerogels are not known to be carcinogenic or toxic. However, they are a mechanical irritant to the eyes, skin, respiratory tract, and digestive system. They can also induce dryness of the skin, eyes, and mucous membranes. Therefore, it is recommended that protective gear including respiratory protection, gloves and eye goggles be worn whenever handling or processing bare aerogels, particularly when a dust or fine fragments may occur.

== See also ==
- Boron nitride aerogel
- Carbon nanofoam
- Fogbank
- Nanogel
- Down feather
- heliumgel of graphene

== Sources ==
- Aegerter, Michel A.; Leventis, Nicholas; Koebel, Matthias M., eds. (2011). Aerogels Handbook. doi:10.1007/978-1-4419-7589-8. ISBN 978-1-4419-7477-8.
- Aegerter, Michel A.; Leventis, Nicholas; Koebel, Matthias; Steiner III, Stephen A., eds. (2023). Springer Handbook of Aerogels. Springer Handbooks. doi:10.1007/978-3-030-27322-4. ISBN 978-3-030-27321-7.
- Barrios, Elizabeth; Fox, David; Li Sip, Yuen Yee; Catarata, Ruginn; Calderon, Jean E.; Azim, Nilab; Afrin, Sajia; Zhang, Zeyang; Zhai, Lei (20 April 2019). "Nanomaterials in Advanced, High-Performance Aerogel Composites: A Review". Polymers. 11 (4): 726. Bibcode:2019Polys..11..726B. doi:10.3390/polym11040726. PMC 6523290. PMID 31010008. This article incorporates text from this source, which is available under the CC BY 4.0 license.
