= Mercouri Kanatzidis =

Greek–American scientist

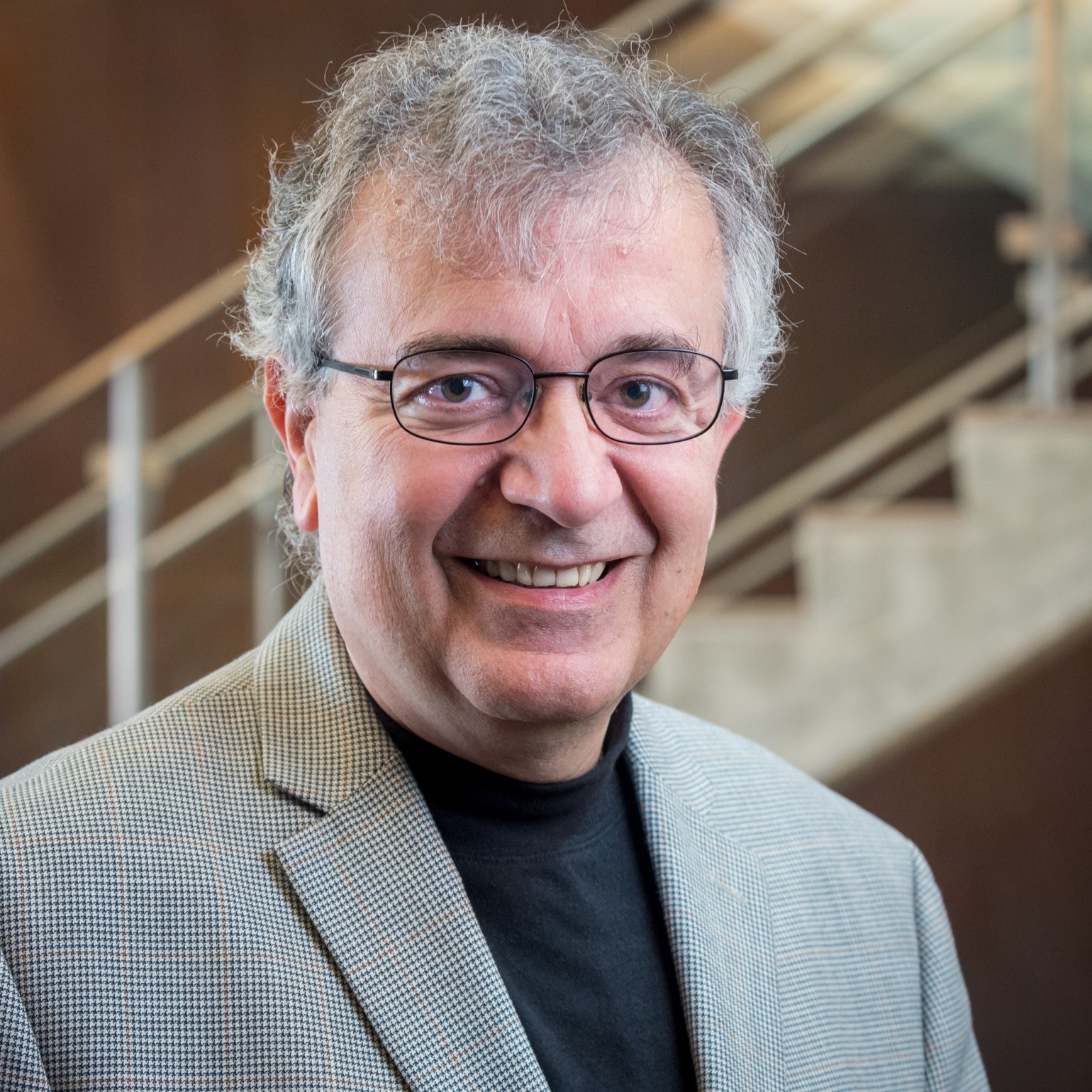
- Born: Mercouri Gregorio Kanatzidis; Thessaloniki, Greece
- Education: Aristotle University of Thessaloniki B.Sc. (1979); University of Iowa Ph.D. (1984)
- Awards: Samson Prime Minister's Prize for Innovation in Alternative Fuels for Transportation, 2016; ACS Award in Inorganic Chemistry, 2016; ENI Award for the "Renewable Energy Prize" category, 2015.
- Scientific career
- Fields: Chemistry, materials science, and nanotechnology
- Workplaces: Northwestern University (2006-present); Argonne National Laboratory; Michigan State University (1987-2006); Northwestern University (1986-1987); University of Michigan (1985)
- Thesis: Synthesis and Characterization of Mixed-Ligand Complexes Containing the Iron4Sulfur4 Core. Synthesis and Characterization of New Novel Complexes Containing the Iron4Sulfur6 Core (1984)
- Doctoral advisor: Dimitri Coucouvanis
- Other academic advisors: Tobin J. Marks

Mercouri G. Kanatzidis (Greek: Μερκούριος Κανατζίδης; born 1957) is a Charles E. and Emma H. Morrison Professor of chemistry and professor of materials science and engineering at Northwestern University and Senior Scientist at Argonne National Laboratory.

Kanatzidis is one of the most cited researchers in Materials Science and Engineering based on Elsevier Scopus data. He has published over 1,655 manuscripts (h-index =197 Google h-index =219]) and has over 60 patents. Kanatzidis has mentored over 100 Ph.D. students and nearly 130 postdoctoral fellows.

== Early life and education ==
Kanatzidis was born in Thessaloniki, Greece. He received his B.S. degree from Aristotle University in 1979 and his Ph.D. from the University of Iowa in 1984 (with Dimitri Coucouvanis). He spent two years at the University of Iowa from 1980 to 1982 and then moved to the University of Michigan when Coucouvanis moved there in 1982.

He was a postdoctoral research fellow at the University of Michigan (1985) and Northwestern University (1986–1987) where he worked with Professor Tobin J. Marks on conductive polymers and intercalation compounds.

He became assistant professor at Michigan State University in 1987. He was promoted to full Professor in 1994. He moved to Northwestern University in 2006.

== Research ==
Kanatzidis developed synthesis methodologies to synthesizing new chalcogenide materials and intermetallics. One of his notable contributions is the panoramic synthesis method, which enables the design and discovery of novel materials. He is also credited with developing flux synthesis techniques that allow for reactions to occur at lower temperatures than conventional methods, leading to the formation of unique structures and compositions.

In addition to these contributions, Kanatzidis's research has resulted in the discovery of metal sulfide ion-exchangers, which have practical applications in the remediation of heavy metals in industrial waste water. These findings demonstrate his ability to not only generate new materials but also to identify and apply them in real-world settings.

Kanatzidis is also credited with defining the concept of nanostructuring in the thermoelectric field. By developing new approaches to controlling the structure and composition of thermoelectric materials at the nanoscale, he has contributed to the advancement of this field and the creation of high-performance materials with unique properties. These methods for achieving "nanostructuring" and all-scale architecturing of thermoelectric semiconductors, resulted in the creation of high-performance materials with unprecedented ZT figures of merit (ZT~2.5). These materials feature coherently embedded nanodots, such as those found in PbTe (a phenomenon known as endotaxy), which significantly reduce thermal conductivity by over 70%, while maintaining high electrical conductivity. This unique combination of properties allows for the attainment of very high ZT values exceeding 2.5 in nanostructured thermoelectric materials.

Kanatzidis, together with fellow Northwestern researcher Professor Robert P.H. Chang developed a novel solar-cell technology that used tin rather than lead in a perovskite material. In their groundbreaking study, they reported the first fully solid-state solar-cell device incorporating a CsSnI3 perovskite film in a solid-state dye-sensitized Grätzel-type cell, where CsSnI3 functioned as an intrinsic semiconductor and hole-transport layer. The work marked an important conceptual shift from liquid-electrolyte dye-sensitized cells toward fully solid-state perovskite semiconductor devices.

In 2016, Kanatzidis and Mohite demonstrated that 2D iodide perovskites form films with vertical slab orientation, and showed >12% efficiency in a solar cell with far better stability than corresponding 3D MAPbI3-based solar cells. . Since then, 2D iodide perovskites have become widely used in mixtures of 2D/3D perovskites for solar cells, exhibiting both high stability and efficiency.

In 2013 he reported the x-ray detecting properties of the perovskite CsPbBr_{3} semiconductor with potential applications in gamma-ray spectroscopy having better than 1.4% energy resolution.

Kanatzidis has proposed ideas and concepts for predictive synthesis to new materials including "infinitely adaptive" homologous superseries and the panoramic synthesis strategy where with a single experiment all phases in the course of a given reaction can be detected. This offers a panoramic view of all the phases present, and could help unravel the mechanisms of how new materials form.

Kanatzidis invented chalcogels, a novel class of porous metal-chalcogenide materials that exhibit aerogel-like properties. These inorganic networks possess a highly open, sponge-like structure with exceptionally high surface area, enabling efficient adsorption of heavy-metal ions and radionuclides from aqueous solutions. Chalcogels have demonstrated the remarkable ability to reduce concentrations of mercury, lead, and cadmium to parts-per-trillion (ppt) levels, as well as to capture radionuclides.

== Awards and honors ==
- 2026 - William H. Nichols Medal
- 2025 - Honorary Doctorate Degree from ETH Zurich, Switzerland
- 2025 - University of Ioannina-Honorary Doctorate Degree
- 2025 - Albert Einstein World Award of Science
- 2025 - ACS Award in the Chemistry of Materials
- 2024 - University of Cyprus Honorary Doctorate Degree
- 2024 - Sigma Xi Walston Chubb Award for Innovation
- 2024 - National Academy of Sciences
- 2023 - Royal Society of Chemistry Centenary Prize
- 2023 - American Academy of Arts and Sciences
- 2022 - Global Energy Prize (declined)
- 2021 - Clarivate Highly Cited Researcher since 2015 (in three different disciplines: chemistry, physics, and materials science)
- 2019 - DOE Ten at Ten Scientific Ideas Award for the first demonstration of all-solid-state solar cells using halide perovskite materials.
- 2018 - American Institute of Chemistry Chemical Pioneer Award
- 2017 - Hershel and Hilda Rich Visiting Professorship, Technion – Israel Institute of Technology
- 2017 - University of Crete - Honorary Doctorate Degree
- 2016 - Samson Prime Minister's Prize for Innovation in Alternative Fuels for Transportation
- 2016 – American Physical Society (APS) Fellow
- 2016 - APS James C. McGroddy Prize for New Materials
- 2016 – ACS Award in Inorganic Chemistry
- 2015 - ENI Award for the "Renewable Energy Prize" category
- 2015 - Awarded Wilhelm Manchot Professorship, Technical University of Munich
- 2015 - Elected Fellow of the Royal Chemical Society
- 2015 - Royal Chemical Society De Gennes Prize
- 2014 – Materials Research Society (MRS) Medal
- 2014 - International Thermoelectric Society Outstanding Achievement Award
- 2014 - Einstein Professor, Chinese Academy of Sciences
- 2013 - Cheetham Lecturer Award, University of California Santa Barbara
- 2012 - American Association for the Advancement of Science (AAAS) Fellow
- 2010 - MRS Fellow
- 2006 - Charles E. and Emma H. Morrison Professor, Northwestern University
- 2003 - Morley Medal, American Chemical Society, Cleveland Section
- 2003 - Alexander von Humboldt Prize
- 2002 - John Simon Guggenheim Foundation Fellow
- 2001 - University Distinguished Professor MSU
- 2000 - Sigma Xi Senior Meritorious Faculty Award
- 1998 - Michigan State University Distinguished Faculty Award
- 1993-1998 - Camille and Henry Dreyfus Teacher Scholar
- 1991-1993 - Alfred P. Sloan Fellow (see Sloan Fellows)
- 1992-1994 - Beckman Young Investigator
- 1990 - ACS Inorganic Chemistry Division Award, EXXON Faculty Fellowship in Solid State Chemistry
- 1989-1994 - Presidential Young Investigator Award, National Science Foundation
