= Ceramic nanoparticle =

Nano-scale ceramic materials

Ceramic nanoparticle is a type of nanoparticle that is composed of ceramics, generally classified as inorganic, heat-resistant, nonmetallic solids that can be made of both metallic and nonmetallic compounds. The material offers unique properties. Macroscale ceramics are brittle and rigid and break upon impact. However, Ceramic nanoparticles take on a larger variety of functions, including dielectric, ferroelectric, piezoelectric, pyroelectric, ferromagnetic, magnetoresistive, superconductive and electro-optical.

Ceramic nanoparticle were discovered in the early 1980s. They were formed using a process called sol-gel which mixes nanoparticles within a solution and gel to form the nanoparticle. Later methods involved sintering (pressure and heat, .e.g hot isostatic pressing). The material is so small that it has basically no flaws. Larger scale materials have flaws that render them brittle.

In 2014 researchers announced a lasering process involving polymers and ceramic particles to form a nanotruss. This structure was able to recover its original form after repeated crushing.

Ceramic nanoparticles have been used as drug delivery mechanism in several diseases including bacterial infections, glaucoma, and most commonly, chemotherapy deliver in experimental cancer treatment.

== Properties ==
Ceramic nanoparticle have unique properties because of their size and molecular structure. These properties are often shown in terms of various electrical and magnetic physics phenomenons which include:

- Dielectric - An electrical insulator that can be polarized (having electrons aligned so that there is a negative and positive side of the compound) by an electric field to shorten the distance of electron transfer in an electric current
- Ferroelectric - dielectric materials that polarize in more than one direction (the negative and positive sides can be flipped via an electric field)
- Piezoelectric - materials that accumulate an electrical charge under mechanical stress
- Pyroelectric - material that can produce a temporary voltage given a temperature change
- Ferromagnetic - materials that can to sustain a magnetic field after magnetization
- Magnetoresistive - materials that change electrical resistance under an external magnetic field
- Superconductive - materials that exhibit zero electric resistance when cooled to a critical temperature
- Electro-optical - materials that change optical properties under an electric field

=== Nanotruss ===
Ceramic nanoparticle is more than 85% air and is very light, strong, flexible and durable. The fractal nanotruss is a nanostructure architecture made of alumina, or aluminum oxide. Its maximum compression is about 1 micron from a thickness of 50 nanometers. After its compression, it can revert to its original shape without any structural damage.

== Synthesis ==
=== Sol-gel ===
One process for making nanoceramics varies is the sol-gel process, also known as chemical solution deposition. This involves a chemical solution, or the sol, made of nanoparticles in liquid phase and a precursor, usually a gel or polymer, made of molecules immersed in a solvent. The sol and gel are mixed to produce an oxide material which are generally a type of ceramic. The excess products (a liquid solvent) are evaporated. The particles desires are then heated in a process called densification to produce a solid product. This method could also be applied to produce a nanocomposite by heating the gel on a thin film to form a nanoceramic layer on top of the film.

=== Two-photon lithography ===
This process uses a laser technique called two-photon lithography to etch out a polymer into a three-dimensional structure. The laser hardens the spots that it touches and leaves the rest unhardened. The unhardened material is then dissolved to produce a "shell". The shell is then coated with ceramic, metals, metallic glass, etc. In the finished state, the nanotruss of ceramic can be flattened and revert to its original state.

=== Sintering ===
In another approach sintering was used to consolidate nanoceramic powders using high temperatures. This resulted in a rough material that damages the properties of ceramics and requires more time to obtain an end product. This technique also limits the possible final geometries. Microwave sintering was developed to overcome such problems. Radiation is produced from a magnetron, which produces electromagnetic waves to vibrate and heat the powder. This method allows for heat to be instantly transferred across the entire volume of material instead of from the outside in.

The nanopowder is placed in an insulation box composed of low insulation boards to allow the microwaves to pass through it. The box increases temperature to aid absorption. Inside the boxes are suspectors that absorb microwaves at room temperature to initialize the sintering process. The microwave heats the suspectors to about 600 °C, sufficient to trigger the nanoceramics to absorb the microwaves.

== History ==
In the early 1980s, the first nanoparticles, specifically nanoceramics were formed, using sol-gel. This process was replaced by sintering in the early 2000s and then by microwave sintering. None of these techniques proved suitable for large scale production.

In 2002, researchers tried to reverse engineer the microstructure of seashells to strengthen ceramics. They discovered that seashells' durability come from their "microarchitecture". Research began to focus on how ceramics could employ such an architecture.

In 2012 researchers replicated the sea sponge's structure using ceramics and the nanoarchitecture called nanotruss. As of 2015 the largest result is a 1mm cube. The lattice structure compresses up to 85% of its original thickness and can recover to its original form. These lattices are stabilized into triangles with cross-members for structural integrity and flexibility.

== Applications ==
Medical technology used Ceramic nanoparticle for bone repair. It has been suggested for areas including energy supply and storage, communication, transportation systems, construction and medical technology. Their electrical properties may allow energy to be transferred efficiencies approaching 100%. Nanotrusses may be eventually applicable for building materials, replacing concrete or steel.
