= Pechini process =

Chemical Process

The Pechini process or liquid mix process as proposed in 1967 is a technique of depositing dielectric films of titanates and niobates of lead and alkaline-earth elements in the production of capacitors. Later, the process was customised for the in-lab synthesis of multicomponent finely dispersed oxide materials. It is named after its American inventor, Maggio Pechini.

== Description ==
It is related to the sol-gel route. An aqueous solution of suitable oxides or salts is mixed with an alpha hydroxycarboxylic acid such as citric acid. Chelation takes place in the solution. A polyhydroxy alcohol is then added, and the liquid is heated to 150–250 °C (300–480 °F) to allow the chelates to polymerize, or form large, cross-linked networks. As excess water is removed by heating, a solid polymeric resin results. Eventually, at still higher temperatures of 500–900 °C (930–1,650 °F), the resin is decomposed or charred, and ultimately a mixed oxide is obtained. Particle size is extremely small, typically 20 to 50 nanometres (although there is agglomeration of these particles into larger clusters), with intimate mixing taking place on the atomic scale.

== Uses ==
This method has been used for synthesizing over 100 mixed metal oxides including lanthanum manganite for solid oxide fuel cells and BaTiO_{3} (Lessing 1989). Unlike the sol–gel process in which the metal alkoxide participates in the gel-forming reactions this process is based on a gelation reaction between the alcohol and acid used as solvents. A polymeric resin containing a good distribution of cations is obtained which yields the oxide upon calcination. The use of polyacrylic acid with higher functionality results in highly cross-linked resins containing a more uniform distribution of the reacting cations. The gel structures can be varied depending on the acid-to-alcohol ratio. A low organic content is preferred to decrease the calcination time and temperature in order to obtain fine-grained materials with low carbon contents.
