= Boron nitride aerogel =

Physical properties
- Density (ρ): 0.6 mg/cm³

Mechanical properties
- Tensile strength (σ_{t}): Not specified
- Compressive strength (σ_{c}): Not specified

Thermal properties
- Melting temperature (T_{m}): Sublimes at ~3000°C
- Thermal conductivity (k): ~0.02 W·m⁻¹·K⁻¹

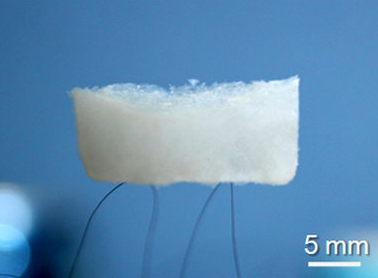
BN aerogel with a mass density of 0.6 mg/cm^{3} resting on human hair.

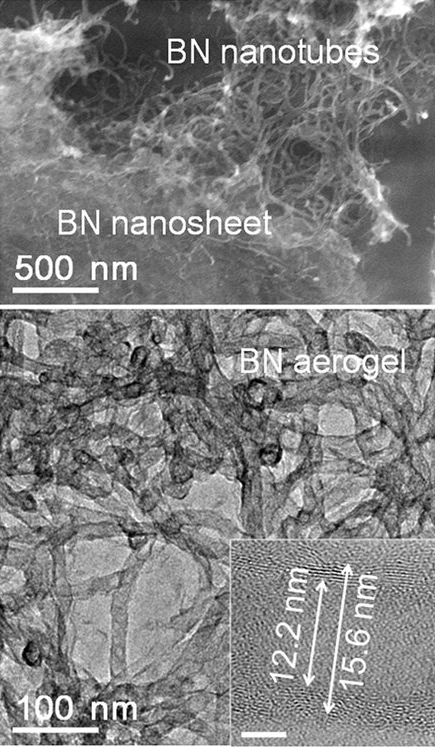
Electron micrographs showing the internal structure of BN aerogel consisting of BN nanotubes and nanosheets.

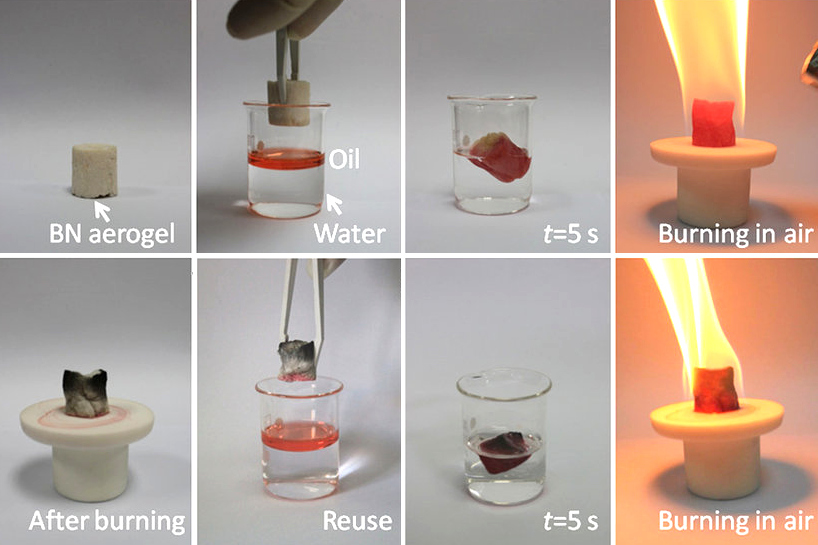
Top: absorption of cyclohexane by BN aerogel within 5 seconds. Cyclohexane is stained with Sudan II red dye and is floating on water. Bottom: reuse of the aerogel after burning in air.

Boron nitride aerogel is an aerogel made of highly porous boron nitride (BN). Different preparation methods produce different porous structures. For example, aerogels assembled from few-layer boron nitride nanosheets have been reported. In a 2015 study, Song and colleagues reported template-assisted BN aerogels with densities as low as 0.6 mg/cm^{3} and specific surface areas of up to approximately 1050 m^{2}/g. The aerogels were hydrophobic and absorbed oil up to 160 times their own mass.

Song and colleagues demonstrated that their oil-loaded aerogels could be regenerated by burning off the absorbed oil in air. Their preparation method used template-assisted chemical vapor deposition at approximately 900 °C, with borazine as the precursor and graphene–carbon nanotube aerogels as templates.

Another route, reported by Lei and colleagues, uses urea-assisted ball milling to exfoliate and functionalize hexagonal BN. After washing to remove the urea, the resulting few-layer BN can be dispersed in water without sonication. Freeze-drying the aqueous dispersion produces an aerogel; a density of 1.4 mg/cm^{3} was reported for material prepared by this route.

Preparation approaches reviewed in the literature include hard-template methods, soft-template methods, assembly of low-dimensional BN structures, and template-free methods. Investigated applications include gas adsorption, catalysis, water purification and thermal management.
