= Aerographene =

Least dense solid material

Aerographene or graphene aerogel is the least dense solid known to exist, at 160 g/m^{3} (0.0100 lb/cu ft; 0.16 mg/cm^{3}; 4.3 oz/yd^{3}). The material reportedly can be produced at the scale of cubic meters.

== Discovery ==
Aerographene was discovered in 2013 at Zhejiang University by a team of scientists led by Gao Chao. He and his team had already successfully created macroscopic materials made out of graphene. These materials were one-dimensional and two-dimensional. However, when synthesizing aerographene, the scientists instead created a three-dimensional structure. The synthesis was accomplished by the freeze-drying of carbon nanotube solutions and large amounts of graphene oxide. Residual oxygen was then removed chemically.

== Fabrication ==
Graphene aerogels are synthetic materials that exhibit high porosity and low density. Typical syntheses of graphene aerogels involve reducing a precursor graphene oxide solution to form graphene hydrogel. The solvent can be subsequently removed from the pores by freeze-drying and replacing with air. The resulting structure consists of a network of covalently bonded graphene sheets surrounding large pockets of air, resulting in densities on the order of 3 mg cm^{−3}.

Graphene aerogel morphologies have also been demonstrated to be controllable through 3D printing methods. Graphene oxide ink composed of graphene oxide gelled in a viscous solution with the addition of silica to lower viscosity and enable printability of the graphene oxide ink. The ink is then extruded from a nozzle into isooctane, which prevents the ink from drying too quickly. Subsequently, the solvent can be removed by freeze drying, while the silica can be removed with a hydrofluoric acid solution. The resulting 3D lattice can be highly ordered while maintaining the high surface areas and low densities characteristic of graphene aerogels.

== Mechanical properties ==
Graphene aerogels exhibit enhanced mechanical properties as a result of their structure and morphology. Graphene aerogels have a Young's modulus on the order of 50 MPa. They can be compressed elastically to strain values >50%. The stiffness and compressibility of graphene aerogels can be attributed in part to the strong sp_{2} bonding of graphene and the π-π interaction between carbon sheets. In graphene aerogels, the π-π interaction can greatly enhance stiffness due to the highly curved and folded regions of graphene as observed through transmission electron microscopy images.

The mechanical properties of graphene aerogel have been shown to depend on the microstructure and thus varies across studies. The role that microstructure plays in the mechanical properties depends on several factors. Computational simulations show that graphene walls bend when a tensile or compressive stress is applied. The resulting stress distribution from the bending of the graphene walls is isotropic and can contribute to the high yield stress observed. The density of the aerogel can also significantly affect the properties observed. The normalized Young's modulus is shown computationally to follow a power-law distribution governed by the equation E/E_{s} = (ρ/ρ_{s})^{m}, where E is the Young's modulus.

Similarly, the compressive strength that describes the yield stress before plastic deformation under compression in graphene aerogels follows a power-law distribution: σ_{y}/E_{s} = (ρ/ρ_{s})^{n}, where σ_{y} is the compressive strength, ρ is the density of the graphene aerogel, E_{s} is the modulus of graphene, ρ_{s} is the density of graphene, and n is the power-law scaling factor that describes the system different from the exponent observed in the modulus. The power-law dependence observed agrees with trends between density and modulus and compressive strength observed in experimental studies on graphene aerogels.

The macroscopic geometric structure of the aerogel has been shown both computationally and experimentally to affect mechanical properties observed. 3D-printed periodic hexagonal graphene aerogel structures exhibited an order-of-magnitude larger modulus compared to bulk graphene aerogels of the same density when the force is applied along the vertical axis. The dependence of stiffness on structure is commonly observed in other cellular structures.

== Applications ==
Due to the high porosity and low density, graphene aerogel has been explored as a potential replacement in flight balloons. The large degree of recoverable compressibility and overall stiffness of the structure has been used in studies in graphene sponges capable of holding 1000× its weight in liquid while recovering all of the absorbed liquid without structural damage to the sponge due to the elasticity of the graphene structure. This has environmental implications, potentially contributing to cleanup of offshore oil spills. It can also be used to gather dust from the tails of comets.

== See also ==
- Aerogel
- Aerographite
- Graphene foam
- Metallic microlattice
