= Tetraethyl orthosilicate =

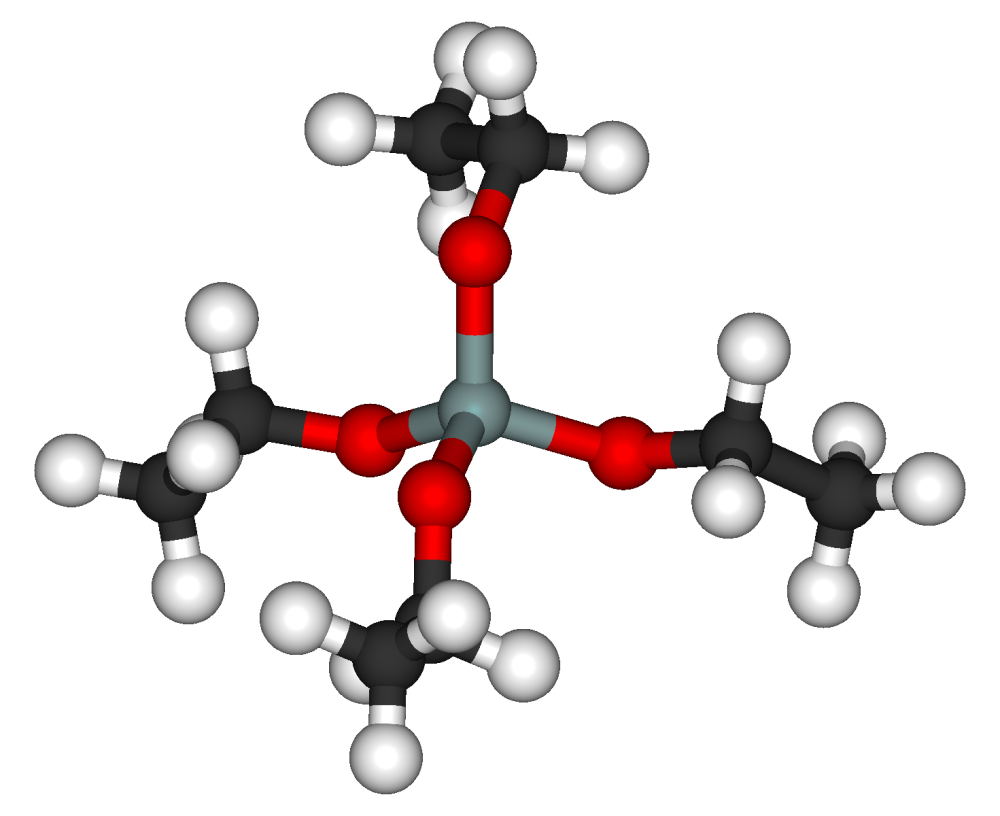

Names
- IUPAC name Tetraethyl orthosilicate
- Other names: Tetraethoxysilane; Ethyl silicate, tetra-; Silicic acid tetraethyl ester; Silicon(IV) ethoxide; TEOS; Tetraethyl silicate (ortho-)

Identifiers
CAS Number	78-10-4
3D model (JSmol)	Interactive image
ChemSpider	6270
ECHA InfoCard	100.000.986
PubChem CID	6517
UNII	42064KRE49
CompTox Dashboard (EPA)	DTXSID6026450
- InChI: InChI=1S/C8H20O4Si/c1-5-9-13(10-6-2,11-7-3)12-8-4/h5-8H2,1-4H3 Key: BOTDANWDWHJENH-UHFFFAOYSA-N; InChI=1/C8H20O4Si/c1-5-9-13(10-6-2,11-7-3)12-8-4/h5-8H2,1-4H3 Key: BOTDANWDWHJENH-UHFFFAOYAS
- SMILES: CCO[Si](OCC)(OCC)OCC

Properties
Chemical formula	Si(OCH_{2}CH_{3})_{4}
Molar mass	208.329 g·mol^{−1}
Appearance	Colourless liquid
Odor	Sharp, alcohol-like
Density	0.933 g/mL at 20 °C
Melting point	−77 °C (−107 °F; 196 K)
Boiling point	168 to 169 °C (334 to 336 °F; 441 to 442 K)
Solubility in water	Reacts with water, soluble in ethanol, and 2-propanol
Vapor pressure	1 mmHg

Hazards
- Occupational safety and health (OHS/OSH)
Main hazards	Flammable, harmful by inhalation
Flash point	45 °C (113 °F; 318 K)
- Lethal dose or concentration (LD, LC)
LD_{50} (median dose)	6270 mg/kg (rat, oral)
LC_{Lo} (lowest published)	1000 ppm (rat, 4 hr); 700 ppm (guinea pig, 6 hr); 1740 ppm (guinea pig, 15 min); 1170 ppm (guinea pig, 2 hr)
- NIOSH (US health exposure limits)
PEL (Permissible)	TWA 100 ppm (850 mg/m^{3})
REL (Recommended)	TWA 10 ppm (85 mg/m^{3})
IDLH (Immediate danger)	700 ppm

Related compounds
Related compounds	Tetramethyl orthosilicate
- Except where otherwise noted, data are given for materials in their standard state (at 25 °C [77 °F], 100 kPa). verify (what is ?) Infobox references

Tetraethyl orthosilicate, formally named tetraethoxysilane (TEOS) or ethyl silicate is an organic compound with the formula Si(OCH_{2}CH_{3})_{4}. TEOS is a colorless liquid. It degrades in water. TEOS is the ethyl ester of orthosilicic acid, Si(OH)_{4}. It is the most prevalent alkoxide of silicon.

TEOS is a tetrahedral molecule at Si atom. Like its many analogues, it is prepared by alcoholysis of silicon tetrachloride:

SiCl_{4} + 4 CH_{3}CH_{2}OH → Si(OCH_{2}CH_{3})_{4} + 4 HCl

== Applications ==
TEOS is mainly used as a crosslinking agent in silicone polymers and as a precursor to silicon dioxide in the semiconductor industry.

TEOS is also used as the silica source for synthesis of some zeolites. Other applications include coatings for carpets and other objects. TEOS is used in the production of aerogel. These applications exploit the reactivity of the Si-OR bonds. TEOS has historically been used as an additive to alcohol based rocket fuels to decrease the heat flux to the chamber wall of regeneratively cooled engines by over 50%.

TEOS is used in steel casting industry as an inorganic binder and stiffener for making silica-based ceramic molding forms (see also sodium silicate). and as an inorganic binder for coatings (passivation) of different materials such as steel, glass, brass, and wood in order to make surfaces resistant to water, oxygen and high temperatures.. Further applications of TEOS include its use as an additive to solid polymers to enhance their adhesion to glass, steel or wood, as a binder for porcelain teeth crowns, and as a precursor to siloxanes.

== Other reactions ==
TEOS easily converts to silicon dioxide upon the addition of water:

Si(OCH_{2}CH_{3})_{4} + 2 H_{2}O → SiO_{2} + 4 CH_{3}CH_{2}OH

An idealized equation is shown, in reality the silica produced is hydrated. This hydrolysis reaction is an example of a sol-gel process. The side product is ethanol. The reaction proceeds via a series of condensation reactions that convert the TEOS molecule into a mineral-like solid via the formation of Si-O-Si linkages. Rates of this conversion are sensitive to the presence of acids and bases, both of which serve as catalysts. The Stöber process allows the formation of monodisperse and mesoporous silica.

At elevated temperatures (>600 °C), TEOS converts to silicon dioxide:

Si(OCH_{2}CH_{3})_{4} → SiO_{2} + 2 (CH_{3}CH_{2})_{2}O

The volatile coproduct is diethyl ether.

== Safety ==
Inhalation of TEOS induces eye and nose irritation, and eye contact with the liquid is irritating. High exposure to TEOS can lead to pulmonary edema, but hazards can be reduced by atmospheric humidity and vapor pressure conditions. The mechanism of irritation is similar to that of tetramethyl orthosilicate.
