= Fogbank =

Material used in US nuclear weapons

Fogbank (stylized as FOGBANK) is a code name given to a secret material used in the W76, W78 and W88 nuclear warheads that are part of the United States nuclear arsenal. The process to create Fogbank was lost by 2000, when it was needed for the refurbishment of old warheads. Fogbank was then reverse engineered by the National Nuclear Security Administration (NNSA), over a span of five years, and at the cost of $92 million ($23 million + $69 million).

Fogbank's precise nature is classified; in the words of former Oak Ridge National Laboratory general manager Dennis Ruddy, "The material is classified. Its composition is classified. Its use in the weapon is classified, and the process itself is classified." However, NNSA administrator Tom D'Agostino disclosed the role of Fogbank in the weapon: "There's another material in the—it's called interstage material, also known as Fogbank".

Department of Energy Nuclear Explosive Safety documents simply describe it as a material "used in nuclear weapons and nuclear explosives" along with lithium hydride (LiH) and lithium deuteride (LiD), beryllium (Be), uranium hydride (UH_{3}), and plutonium hydride. Arms experts believe that Fogbank is an aerogel material which acts as an interstage material in a nuclear warhead; i.e., a material designed to become a superheated plasma following the detonation of the weapon's fission stage, the plasma then triggering the fusion-stage detonation. "Aerogel" refers to a microporous solid in which the dispersed phase is a gas; dozens of such materials have been invented. They have extremely low density (typically 3–7 times that of air) and low thermal conductivity.

== History ==
It has been revealed by unclassified official sources that Fogbank was originally manufactured in Facility 9404-11 of the Y-12 National Security Complex in Oak Ridge, Tennessee, from 1975 until 1989, when the final batch of W76 warheads was completed. After that, the facility was deactivated and finally slated for decommissioning by 1993. Only a small pilot plant was left, which had been used to produce small batches of Fogbank for testing purposes.

In 1996, the US government decided to replace, refurbish, or decommission large numbers of its nuclear weapons. Accordingly, the Department of Energy established a refurbishment program to extend the service lives of older nuclear weapons. In 2000, the NNSA specified a life-extension program for W76 warheads that would enable them to remain in service until at least 2040.

It was soon realized that the Fogbank material was a potential source of problems for the program, as few records of its manufacturing process had been retained when it was originally manufactured in the 1980s, and nearly all staff members who had expertise in its production had either retired or left the agency. The NNSA briefly investigated sourcing a substitute for Fogbank but eventually decided that since Fogbank had been produced previously, they would be able to repeat it. Additionally, "Los Alamos computer simulations at that time were not sophisticated enough to determine conclusively that an alternate material would function as effectively as Fogbank," according to a Los Alamos publication.

With Facility 9404-11 long since decommissioned, a new production facility was required. Delays arose during its construction. Engineers repeatedly encountered failure in their efforts to produce Fogbank. Manufacture involves the moderately toxic, highly volatile solvent acetonitrile, which presents a hazard for workers (causing three evacuations in March 2006 alone). As multiple deadlines expired, and the schedule was pushed back repeatedly, the NNSA eventually invested $23 million to find an alternative to Fogbank.

In March 2007, engineers devised a manufacturing process for Fogbank. The material turned out to have problems when tested, and in September 2007 the Fogbank project was upgraded to "Code Blue" status by the NNSA, making it a major priority. In 2008, following the expenditure of a further $69 million, the NNSA managed to manufacture Fogbank, and 7 months later the first refurbished warhead was provided to the U.S. Navy, nearly a decade after the commencement of the refurbishment program. In May 2009 a U.S. Navy spokesman said that they had not received any refurbished weapons. The Energy Department stated that the current plan was to begin shipping refurbished weapons in late 2009, two years behind schedule.

The experience of reverse engineering Fogbank led to improvements in understanding of the material and its manufacturing process. The new production team observed production failures similar to those noted by the original scientists. Investigation traced the problem to a particular impurity that remained after the original purification process and subtly altered the material's structure. A root cause investigation determined that this structural change had been implicitly relied upon in a downstream process, even though it had never been explicitly documented, tested, or controlled. The new purification methods removed more of the impurity, reducing the quality of the final product. Once the impurity's role was understood, the team established the required concentration, added it in a separate production step, and monitored it explicitly.

The W76 life-extension project was completed in December 2018, when 800 W76s were upgraded to the W76-1 design. It is unclear whether the new W76-2 uses Fogbank.
