= Tetramethyl orthosilicate =

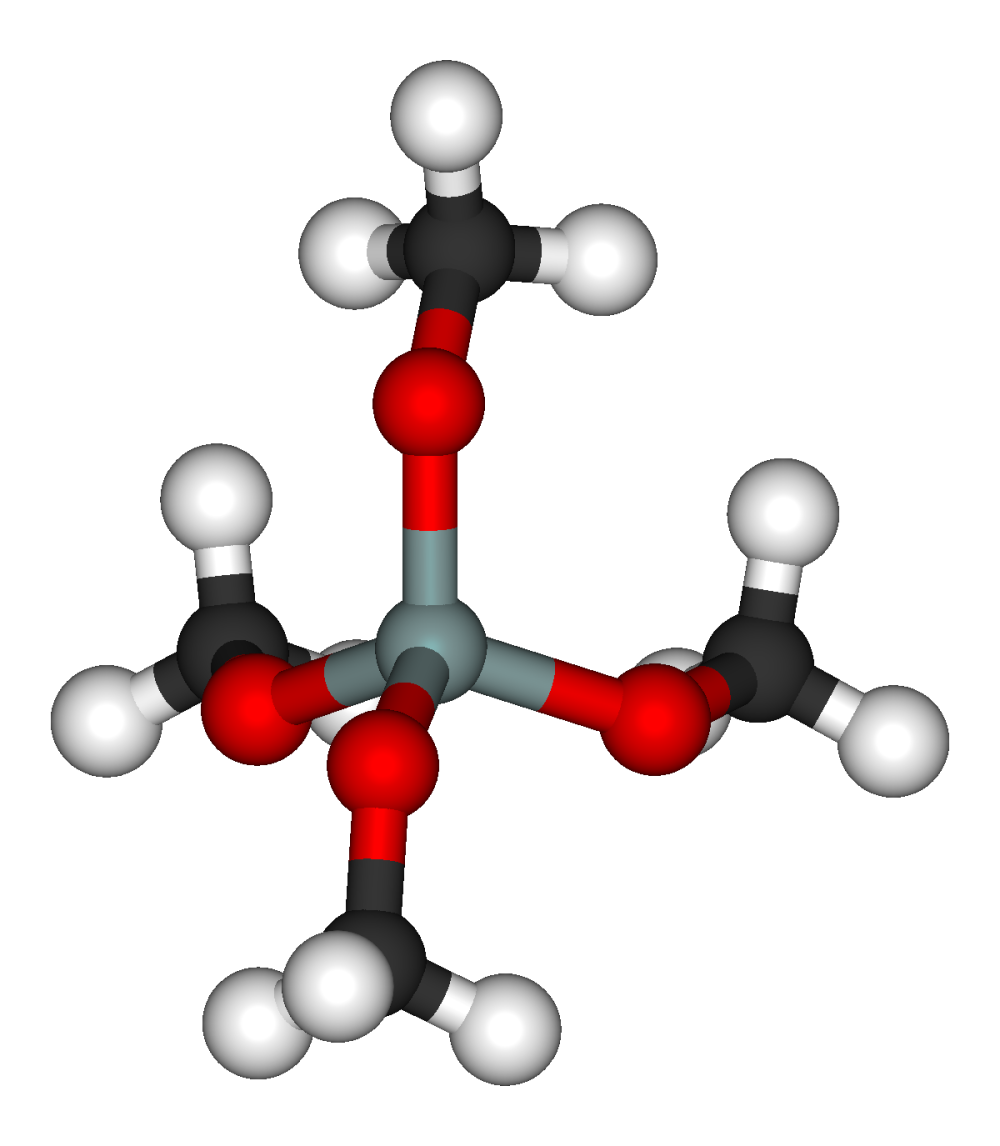

Names
- IUPAC name Tetramethyl orthosilicate
- Other names: Tetramethyl orthosilicate; Methyl silicate; Silicic acid, tetramethyl ester; Silicon methoxide; TMOS

Identifiers
CAS Number	681-84-5
3D model (JSmol)	Interactive image
ChemSpider	12161
ECHA InfoCard	100.010.598
PubChem CID	12682
UNII	19D35VPL66
CompTox Dashboard (EPA)	DTXSID3027291
- InChI: InChI=1S/C4H12O4Si/c1-5-9(6-2,7-3)8-4/h1-4H3 Key: LFQCEHFDDXELDD-UHFFFAOYSA-N; InChI=1/C4H12O4Si/c1-5-9(6-2,7-3)8-4/h1-4H3 Key: LFQCEHFDDXELDD-UHFFFAOYAT
- SMILES: CO[Si](OC)(OC)OC

Properties
Chemical formula	Si(OCH_{3})_{4}
Molar mass	152.221 g·mol^{−1}
Appearance	colourless liquid
Density	1.032
Melting point	4 to 5 °C (39 to 41 °F; 277 to 278 K)
Boiling point	121 to 122 °C (250 to 252 °F; 394 to 395 K)
Solubility in water	organic solvents
Vapor pressure	12 mmHg (25°C)

Hazards
- Occupational safety and health (OHS/OSH)
Main hazards	toxic
NFPA 704 (fire diamond)	4 2 0
Flash point	96 °C; 205 °F; 369 K
- NIOSH (US health exposure limits)
PEL (Permissible)	none
REL (Recommended)	TWA 1 ppm (6 mg/m^{3})
IDLH (Immediate danger)	N.D.

Related compounds
Other cations	Tetraethyl orthosilicate Trimethyl borate Trimethyl phosphite
- Except where otherwise noted, data are given for materials in their standard state (at 25 °C [77 °F], 100 kPa). verify (what is ?) Infobox references

Tetramethyl orthosilicate (TMOS) is the chemical compound with the formula Si(OCH_{3})_{4}. This molecule consists of four methoxy groups bonded to a silicon atom. It is the tetramethyl ester of orthosilicic acid. The basic properties are similar to the more popular tetraethyl orthosilicate, which is usually preferred because the product of hydrolysis, ethanol, is less toxic than methanol.

Tetramethyl orthosilicate hydrolyzes to SiO_{2}:

Si(OCH_{3})_{4} + 2 H_{2}O → SiO_{2} + 4 CH_{3}OH

In organic synthesis, Si(OCH_{3})_{4} has been used to convert ketones and aldehydes to the corresponding ketals and acetals, respectively.

== Safety ==
The hydrolysis of Si(OCH_{3})_{4} produces insoluble SiO_{2} and CH_{3}OH (methanol). Even at low concentrations inhalation causes lung lesions, and at slightly higher concentrations eye contact with the vapor causes blindness. At low concentrations (200 ppm per 15 min) the damage is often insidious, with onset of symptoms hours after exposure. The mode of action is the precipitation of silica in the eyes and/or lungs. Contrary to common information, including several erroneous MSDS sheets, the methanol produced is only a risk through chronic exposure and is a comparatively small concern. The mechanisms of methanol toxicity are well established, methanol causes blindness via conversion to formaldehyde, then to toxic formic acid in the liver; methanol splashes to the eye cause only moderate and reversible eye irritation.
