= Silicon alkoxide =

Silicon alkoxides are a group of alkoxides, chemical compounds of silicon and an alcohol, with the formula Si(OR)_{4}.

Silicon alkoxides are important precursors for the manufacture of silica-based aerogels.
