= Supercritical drying =

Process to remove liquid

Supercritical drying (red arrow) goes beyond the critical point of the working fluid in order to avoid the direct liquid–gas transition seen in ordinary drying (green arrow) or the two phase changes in freeze-drying (blue arrow).

Supercritical drying, also known as critical point drying, is a process to remove liquid in a precise and controlled way. It is useful in the production of microelectromechanical systems (MEMS), the drying of spices, the production of aerogel, the decaffeination of coffee and in the preparation of biological specimens.

== Phase diagram ==
As the substance in a liquid body crosses the boundary from liquid to gas (see green arrow in phase diagram), the liquid changes into gas at a finite rate, while the amount of liquid decreases. When this happens within a heterogeneous environment, surface tension in the liquid body pulls against any solid structures the liquid might be in contact with. Delicate structures such as cell walls, the dendrites in silica gel, and the tiny machinery of microelectromechanical devices, tend to be broken apart by this surface tension as the liquid–gas–solid junction moves by.

To avoid this, the sample can be brought via two possible alternate paths from the liquid phase to the gas phase without crossing the liquid–gas boundary on the phase diagram. In freeze-drying, this means going around to the left (low temperature, low pressure; blue arrow). However, some structures are disrupted even by the solid–gas boundary. Supercritical drying, on the other hand, goes around the line to the right, on the high-temperature, high-pressure side (red arrow). This route from liquid to gas does not cross any phase boundary, instead passing through the supercritical region, where the distinction between gas and liquid ceases to apply. Densities of the liquid phase and vapor phase become equal at critical point of drying.

== Fluids ==
Phase diagram showing the supercritical region (light blue) of carbon dioxide.

Almost all fluids can undergo supercritical drying as a physical chemistry process, but the harsh conditions involved will often make it impractical as part of an industrial process. Fluids which do see industrial application of supercritical drying include carbon dioxide (critical point 304.25 K at 7.39 MPa or 31.1 °C at 1072 psi) and freon (≈300 K at 3.5–4 MPa or 25–0 °C at 500–600 psi). Nitrous oxide has similar physical behavior to carbon dioxide, but is a powerful oxidizer in its supercritical state. Supercritical water is inconvenient due to possible heat damage to a sample at its critical point temperature (647 K, 374 °C) and corrosiveness of water at such high temperatures and pressures (22.064 MPa, 3,212 psi).

In most such processes, acetone is first used to wash away all water, exploiting the complete miscibility of these two fluids. The acetone is then washed away with high pressure liquid carbon dioxide, the industry standard now that freon is unavailable. The liquid carbon dioxide is then heated until its temperature goes beyond the critical point, at which time the pressure can be gradually released, allowing the gas to escape and leaving a dried product.

== See also ==
- Freeze-drying
