= Chalcogel =

Type of aerogel

A chalcogel or properly metal chalcogenide aerogel is an aerogel made from chalcogenides. Chalcogels preferentially absorb heavy metals, such as mercury, lead, and cadmium, from water. Sulfide chalcogels are also very good at desulfurization.

Metal chalcogenide aerogels can be prepared from thiolysis or nanoparticle condensation and contain crystalline nanoparticles in the structure. The synthetic method can be extended to many thioanions, including tetrathiomolybdate-based chalcogels. Different metal ions have been used as linkers Co^{2+}, Ni^{2+}, Pb^{2+}, Cd^{2+}, Bi^{3+}, Cr^{3+}.

When the gels are dried aerogels with high surface areas are obtained and the materials have multifunctional nature. For example, chalcogels are especially promising for gas separation. They were reported to exhibit high selectivity in CO_{2} and C_{2}H_{6} over H_{2} and CH_{4} adsorption. The latter is relevant to exit gas stream composition of water gas shift reaction and steam reforming reactions (reactions widely used for H_{2} production). For example, separation of gas pairs such as CO_{2}/H_{2}, CO_{2}/CH_{4}, and CO_{2}/N_{2} are key steps in precombustion capture of CO_{2}, natural gas sweetening and postcombustion capture of CO_{2} processes leading ultimately at upgrading of the raw gas. The above mentioned conditioning makes the gas suitable for a number of applications in fuel cells.

Chalcogels were shown to be very effective at capturing radionuclides from nuclear waste such as ^{99}Tc, and ^{238}U, and especially ^{129}I.
