= Aerographite =

Extremely light synthetic foam of tubular carbon molecules

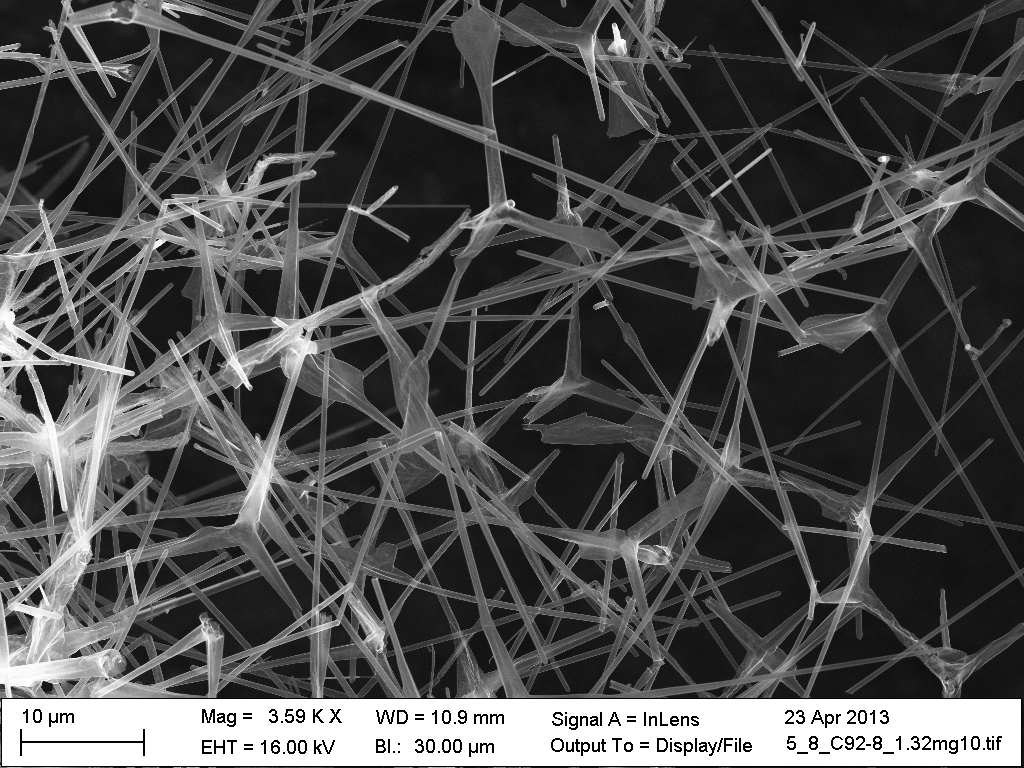
Internal structure of a 'closed-graphitic-shell' aerographite (SEM image)

Aerographite is a synthetic foam consisting of a porous interconnected network of tubular carbon. With a density of 180 g/m^{3} it is one of the lightest structural materials ever created. It was developed jointly by a team of researchers at Kiel University and the Technical University of Hamburg in Germany, and was first reported in a scientific journal in June 2012.

== Structure and properties ==
Aerographite is a black freestanding material that can be produced in various shapes occupying a volume of up to several cubic centimeters. It consists of a seamless interconnected network of carbon tubes that have micron-scale diameters and a wall thickness of about 15 nm. Because of the relatively lower curvature and larger wall thickness, these walls differ from the graphene-like shells of carbon nanotubes and resemble vitreous carbon in their properties. These walls are often discontinuous and contain wrinkled areas that improve the elastic properties of aerographite. The carbon bonding in aerographite has an sp^{2} character, as confirmed by electron energy loss spectroscopy and electrical conductivity measurements. Upon external compression, the conductivity increases, along with material density, from ~0.2 S/m at 0.18 mg/cm^{3} to 0.8 S/m at 0.2 mg/cm^{3}. The conductivity is higher for a denser material, 37 S/m at 50 mg/cm^{3}.

Owing to its interconnected tubular network structure, aerographite resists tensile forces much better than other carbon foams as well as silica aerogels. It sustains extensive elastic deformations and has a very low Poisson's ratio. A complete shape recovery of a 3-mm-tall sample after it was compressed down to 0.1 mm is possible. Its ultimate tensile strength (UTS) depends on material density and is about 160 kPa at 8.5 mg/cm^{3} and 1 kPa at 0.18 mg/cm^{3}; in comparison, the strongest silica aerogels have a UTS of 16 kPa at 100 mg/cm^{3}. The Young's modulus is ca. 15 kPa at 0.2 mg/cm^{3} in tension, but is much lower in compression, increasing from 1 kPa at 0.2 mg/cm^{3} to 7 kPa at 15 mg/cm^{3}. The density given by the authors is based on a mass measurement and the determination of the outer volume of the synthetic foams as usually performed also for other structures.

Aerographite is superhydrophobic, thus its centimeter-sized samples repel water; they are also rather sensitive to electrostatic effects and spontaneously jump to charged objects.

== Synthesis ==
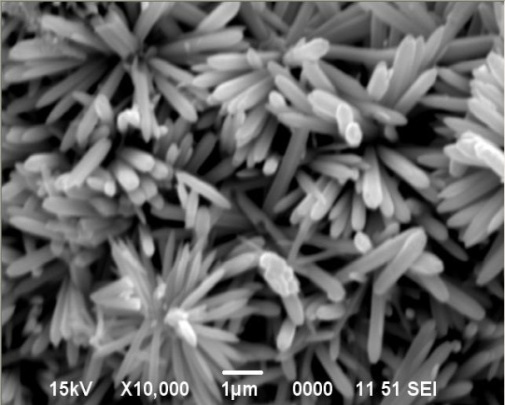
Similar ZnO multipod-shaped templates, having various diameters and network density and topology, are used for deposition of aerographite.

Common aspects of synthesis:
With the aerographite's chemical vapor deposition (CVD) process metal oxides had been shown in 2012 to be a suitable template for deposition of graphitic structures. The templates can be in situ removed. Basic mechanism is the reduction of metal oxide to a metallic constituent, the nucleation of carbon in and on top of metal and the simultaneous evaporation of metal component. Requirements for the metal oxides are: a low activation energy for chemical reduction, a metal phase, which can nucleate graphite, a low evaporation point of metal phase (ZnO, SnO). From engineering perspective, the developed CVD process enables the use of ceramic powder processing (use of custom particles and sintering bridges) for creation of templates for 3D carbon via CVD. Key advantages compared to commonly used metal templates are: shape variety of particle shapes, the creation of sintering bridges and the removal without acids. Originally demonstrated on just μm-sized meshed graphite networks, the CVD mechanism had been adopted after 2014 by other scientists to create nm-sized carbon structures.

Details specific to reference:
Aerographite is produced by chemical vapor deposition, using a ZnO template. The template consists of micron-thick rods, often in the shape of multipods, that can be synthesized by mixing comparable amounts of Zn and polyvinyl butyral powders and heating the mixture at 900 °C. The aerographite synthesis is carried out at ~760 °C, under an argon gas flow, to which toluene vapors are injected as a carbon source. A thin (~15 nm), discontinuous layer of carbon is deposited on ZnO which is then etched away by adding hydrogen gas to the reaction chamber. Thus the remaining carbon network closely follows the morphology of the original ZnO template. In particular, the nodes of the aerographite network originate from the joints of the ZnO multipods.

== Potential applications ==
Aerographite electrodes have been tested in an electric double-layer capacitor (EDLC, also known as supercapacitor) and endured the mechanical shocks related to loading-unloading cycles and crystallization of the electrolyte (that occurs upon evaporation of the solvent). Their specific energy of 1.25 Wh/kg is comparable to that of carbon nanotube electrodes (~2.3 Wh/kg).

=== Space travel ===
Because aerographite is both black and light, it was proposed as a light-sail material. Simulations show that 1 kg spacecraft with aerographite solar sail can reach Mars in 26 days.

Separately, it was proposed to release 1 μm particles from the solar altitude reached by the Parker solar probe. The solar wind would accelerate them to over 2% of lightspeed or 6000 km/sec. A steady stream of pellets could be used by plasma magnet propulsion systems to accelerate payloads to 6% of lightspeed, or 18000 km/sec.

== See also ==
- Aerogels
- Graphene
- Metallic microlattice
