= Agricultural soil science =

Branch of soil science

Agricultural soil science is a branch of soil science that deals with the study of edaphic conditions as they relate to the production of food and fiber. In this context, it is also a constituent of the field of agronomy and is thus also described as soil agronomy.

== History ==
Prior to the development of pedology in the 19th century, agricultural soil science (or edaphology) was the only branch of soil science. The bias of early soil science toward viewing soils only in terms of their agricultural potential continues to define the soil science profession in both academic and popular settings as of 2006.

== Current status ==
Agricultural soil science follows the holistic method. Soil is investigated in relation to and as integral part of terrestrial ecosystems but is also recognized as a manageable natural resource.

Agricultural soil science studies the chemical, physical, biological, and mineralogical composition of soils as they relate to agriculture. Agricultural soil scientists develop methods that will improve the use of soil and increase the production of food and fiber crops. Emphasis continues to grow on the importance of soil sustainability. From the last two decades some new (or renewed) concepts have been developed such as ecosystem services, soil health and soil multifunctionality. Soil degradation such as erosion, compaction, lowered fertility, and contamination continue to be serious concerns. They conduct research in irrigation and drainage, tillage, soil classification, plant nutrition, soil fertility, and other areas, e.g. greenhouse effect mitigation.

Although maximizing agricultural production (both plant and animal) is a valid goal in the frame of human population growth, sometimes it may come at high cost which can be readily evident, e.g. massive crop diseases stemming from monocultures, or the long-term impact of chemical fertilizers and pesticides on groundwater contamination and human health. An agricultural soil scientist may come up with a plan that can maximize production using sustainable methods and solutions, and in order to do that they must look into a number of science fields including agricultural science, physics, chemistry, biology, meteorology and geology.

== Kinds of soil and their variables ==
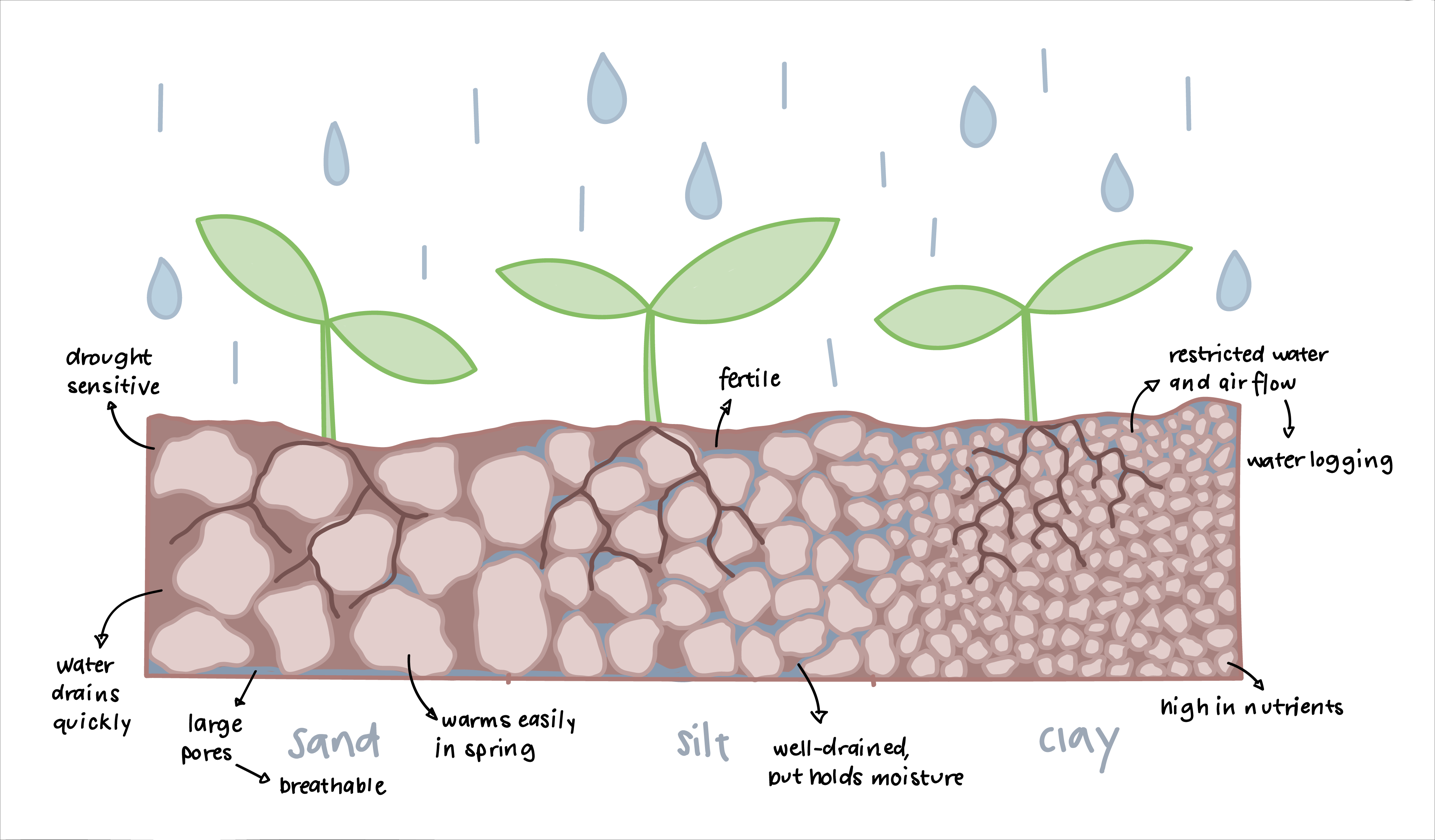
The soil texture determines the aeration, drainage, fertility, and porosity of the soil.

Some soil variables of special interest to agricultural soil science are:

- Soil texture or soil composition: Soils are composed of solid particles of various sizes. In decreasing order, these particles are boulders, gravels, sand, silt and clay. Every agricultural soil can be classified according to the relative percentage of sand, silt and clay it contains.
- Aeration and porosity: Atmospheric air contains elements such as oxygen, nitrogen, carbon and others. These elements are prerequisites for life on Earth. Particularly, all cells (including root cells) require oxygen to function and if conditions become anaerobic they fail to respire and metabolize. Aeration in this context refers to the mechanisms by which air is delivered to the soil. In natural ecosystems soil aeration is chiefly accomplished through the effect of soil organisms on soil structure. Humans commonly aerate the agricultural soil by tilling and plowing, yet such practice may cause degradation. Porosity refers to the air-holding capacity of the soil, which is necessary for soil life and is threatened by the use of heavy machinery. See also characterisation of pore space in soil.
- Drainage: In soils of bad drainage the water delivered through rain or irrigation may pool and stagnate. As a result, anaerobic conditions prevail and plant roots suffocate. Stagnant water also favors plant-attacking water molds. In soils of excess drainage, on the other hand, plants don't get to absorb adequate water and nutrients are washed from the porous medium to end up in groundwater reserves.
- Water content: Without soil moisture, more exactly when soil moisture falls below the wilting point, there is no transpiration, no growth and plants wilt. Technically, plant cells lose their pressure (see osmotic pressure and turgor pressure). Plants contribute directly to soil moisture. For instance, they create a leafy cover that minimizes the evaporative effects of solar radiation, a property which is currently used in agroforestry. But even when plants or parts of plants die, the decaying plant matter produces a thick organic cover that protects the soil from evaporation, erosion and compaction, and add a habitat for a variety of beneficial soil organisms. For more on this subject see mulch.
- Water potential: Water potential describes the tendency of the water to flow from one area of the soil to another. While water delivered to the soil surface normally flows downward due to gravity, at some point it meets increased pressure which causes a reverse upward flow. This effect is known as water suction. Field capacity, the water content retained in the soil at −33 kPa (or −0.33 bar) water potential, when air is in the macropores, and water is in the micropores, is the optimal condition for plant growth and microbial activity. It varies with soil texture, increasing with decreasing size of soil particles (i.e. from sand to clay).
- Horizonation: Typically found in advanced and mature soils, horizonation refers to the creation of soil layers with differing characteristics. It affects almost all soil variables.
- Fertility: A fertile soil is one rich in nutrients and organic matter. Modern agricultural methods (intensive farming) have rendered much of the arable land infertile. In such cases, soil can no longer support on its own plants with high nutritional demand and thus needs an external source of nutrients, such as organic amendments or recurrent fertilizer application. However, there are cases where human activity is thought to be responsible for transforming rather infertile soils into fertile ones, as in the use of charcoal in the formation of Amazonian terra preta.
- Biota and soil biota: Soil organisms interact with the soil and contribute to its quality in innumerable ways. Sometimes the nature of the interaction may be unclear, in particular in the frame of global changes, yet a rule is becoming evident: the amount and diversity of the biota is "proportional" to the quality of the soil. Clades of interest include bacteria, fungi, nematodes, annelids and arthropods.
- Soil acidity or soil pH and cation-exchange capacity: Root cells act as hydrogen pumps and the surrounding concentration of hydrogen ions affects their ability to absorb nutrients. pH is a measure of this concentration. Each plant species achieves maximum growth in a particular pH range, yet the vast majority of edible plants can grow in soil pH between 6 and 8.

Soil scientists use a soil classification system to describe soil qualities. The International Union of Soil Sciences endorses the World Reference Base as the international standard.

== Soil fertility ==
Agricultural soil scientists study ways to make soils more productive and to make this production sustainable in the long term. They classify soils and test them to determine whether they contain nutrients vital to plant growth. Such nutritional substances include compounds of nitrogen, phosphorus, and potassium. If a certain soil is deficient in these substances, fertilizers may provide them. Agricultural soil scientists investigate the movement of nutrients through the soil, and the amount of nutrients absorbed by plant roots. Agricultural soil scientists also examine the development of roots and their relation to the soil. Some agricultural soil scientists try to understand the structure and function of soils in relation to soil fertility. They grasp the structure of soil as porous solid. The solid frames of soil (the soil matrix) consist of minerals derived from rocks and organic matter originated from the dead bodies and organs and excreta of various soil organisms. The pore space of the soil is essential for the soil to become productive. Small pores (micropores) serve as water reservoir supplying water to plants and other organisms in the soil during the rain-less period. The water in the small pores of soils is not pure water; they call it soil solution. In soil solution, various plant nutrients derived from minerals and organic matters in the soil are there. This is measured through the cation exchange capacity. Large pores (macropores) serve as water drainage pipe to allow the excessive water pass through the soil, during the heavy rains. They also serve as air tank to supply oxygen to plant roots and other living beings in the soil.

== Soil preservation ==
In addition, agricultural soil scientists develop methods to preserve the agricultural productivity of soil and to decrease the effects on productivity of erosion by wind and water. For example, a technique called contour plowing may be used to prevent soil erosion and conserve water through avoidance of surface runoff. Researchers in agricultural soil science also seek ways to use the soil more effectively in addressing associated challenges. Such challenges include the beneficial reuse of human and animal wastes using agricultural crops, agricultural soil management aspects of preventing water pollution and the build-up in agricultural soil of chemical pesticides. Regenerative agriculture practices can be used to address these challenges and rebuild soil health.

== Employment of agricultural soil scientists ==
Most agricultural soil scientists are consultants, researchers, or teachers. Many work in the developed world as farm advisors, in agricultural experiment stations, federal, state or local government agencies, industrial firms, or universities. Within the USA they may be trained through the USDA's Cooperative Extension Service offices, although other countries may use universities, research institutes or research agencies. Elsewhere, agricultural soil scientists may serve in international organizations such as the Agency for International Development and the Food and Agriculture Organization of the United Nations.

== Quotations ==
[The key objective of the soil science discipline is that of] finding ways to meet growing human needs for food and fiber while maintaining environmental stability and conserving resources for future generations

— John W. Doran, 2002 SSSA President, 2002

Many people have the vague notion that soil science is merely a phase of agronomy and deals only with practical soil management for field crops. Whether we like it or not this is the image many have of us

— Charles Edwin Kellogg, 1961

== See also ==
- Agricultural science
- Agrogeology
- Agrology
- Compost
- Potting soil
- Soil biology
- Soil conditioner
- Soil science
- Regenerative agriculture
