= Porous silicon =

Form of the chemical element silicon

Porous silicon (abbreviated as "PS" or "pSi") is a form of the chemical element silicon that has introduced nanopores in its microstructure, rendering a large surface to volume ratio in the order of 500 m^{2}/cm^{3}.

== History ==
Porous silicon was discovered by accident in 1956 by Arthur Uhlir Jr. and Ingeborg Uhlir at the Bell Labs in the U.S. At the time, the Uhlirs were in the process of developing a technique for polishing and shaping the surfaces of silicon and germanium. However, it was found that under several conditions a crude product in the form of thick black, red or brown film were formed on the surface of the material. At the time, the findings were not taken further and were only mentioned in Bell Lab's technical notes.

In the early 1980s, researchers at the Royal Signals and Radar Establishment (RSRE) in Malvern, England, carried out the first systematic study of the formation and microstructure of porous silicon. In 1985, Beale, Benjamin, Uren, Chew and Cullis published two key papers establishing that porous silicon was not a deposited stain film, as previously assumed, but was formed by electrochemical etching of pores with aspect ratios exceeding 1000:1. Using cross-sectional transmission electron microscopy, they identified two distinct types of porous silicon microstructure, dependent on the dopant concentration: in heavily doped (degenerate) silicon, current transport through the Schottky barrier at the silicon–electrolyte interface proceeds by quantum mechanical tunnelling, while in lightly doped (non-degenerate) silicon it occurs via thermionic emission. They proposed a formation theory accounting for the dependence of microstructure on anodising conditions, and demonstrated the formation of porous gallium arsenide — the first porous III–V semiconductor — confirming the generality of the mechanism. In 1986, the same group also demonstrated that chemical stain etching produces porous silicon identical in structure to that formed by anodisation, unifying the two formation routes. This work on the formation mechanism and microstructure provided the basis for much of the subsequent research into the material's properties and applications—in fields as diverse as optoelectronics and photonics, chemical and biological sensing, biomedicine and drug delivery, photovoltaics, energy storage and microelectromechanical systems—and the model continues to be cited as a standard reference for porous silicon formation.

Despite the discovery of porous silicon in the 1950s and the elucidation of its formation mechanism in the mid-1980s, the material attracted little wider attention until the end of the decade, when its nanoscale structure—a network of nanometre-sized pores within a crystalline silicon skeleton—was recognised as the source of optical, electronic and surface properties quite different from those of bulk silicon, triggering the rapid growth of interest that established porous silicon as a versatile nanostructured material with applications across optoelectronics, sensing, biomedicine, photovoltaics, energy storage and microelectronics. At the time, Leigh Canham – while working at the Defence Research Agency in England – reasoned that the porous silicon may display quantum confinement effects. The intuition was followed by successful experimental results published in 1990. In the published experiment, it was revealed that silicon wafers can emit light if subjected to electrochemical and chemical dissolution.

The published result stimulated the interest of the scientific community in its non-linear optical and electrical properties. The growing interest was evidenced in the number of published work concerning the properties and potential applications of porous silicon. In an article published in 2000, it was found that the number of published work grew exponentially in between 1991 and 1995.

In 2001, a team of scientists at the Technical University of Munich inadvertently discovered that hydrogenated porous silicon reacts explosively with oxygen at cryogenic temperatures, releasing several times as much energy as an equivalent amount of TNT, at a much greater speed. (An abstract of the study can be found below.) Explosion occurs because the oxygen, which is in a liquid state at the necessary temperatures, is able to oxidize through the porous molecular structure of the silicon extremely rapidly, causing a very quick and efficient detonation. Although hydrogenated porous silicon would probably not be effective as a weapon, due to its functioning only at low temperatures, other uses are being explored for its explosive properties, such as providing thrust for satellites.

== Fabrication of porous silicon ==
Anodization and stain-etching are the two most common methods used for fabrication of porous silicon; however, there are almost twenty other methods to fabricate this material. Drying and surface modification might be needed afterwards. If anodization in an aqueous solution is used to form microporous silicon, the material is commonly treated in ethanol immediately after fabrication, to avoid damage to the structure that results due to the stresses of the capillary effect of the aqueous solution.

=== Anodization ===
Schematic view of the anodization cell

One method of introducing pores in silicon is through the use of an anodization cell. A possible anodization cell is made of Teflon and employs a platinum cathode and a crystalline Si wafer anode immersed in hydrogen fluoride (HF) electrolyte. Recently, inert diamond cathodes were used to avoid metallic impurities in the electrolyte and inert diamond anodes form an improved electrical back plate contact to the silicon wafers. Corrosion of the anode is produced by running electric current through the cell. It is noted that etching with constant DC is usually implemented to ensure steady tip-concentration of HF resulting in a more homogeneous porous layer, while pulsed current is more appropriate for the formation of thick PS layers with thickness greater than 50 μm. Pore direction is governed by crystal orientation. In (100)-cut Si the pores are oriented perpendicular to the wafer's surface.

It was noted by Halimaoui that hydrogen evolution occurs during the formation of porous silicon.

When purely aqueous HF solutions are used for the PS formation, the hydrogen bubbles stick to the surface and induce lateral and in-depth inhomogeneity

The hydrogen evolution is normally treated with absolute ethanol in concentration exceeding 15%. It was found that the introduction of ethanol eliminates hydrogen and ensures complete infiltration of HF solution within the pores. Subsequently, uniform distribution of porosity and thickness is improved.

=== Stain etching ===
It is possible to obtain porous silicon through stain-etching with hydrofluoric acid, nitric acid and water. A publication in 1957 revealed that stain films can be grown in dilute solutions of nitric acid in concentrated hydrofluoric acid. Porous silicon formation by stain-etching is particularly attractive because of its simplicity and the presence of readily available corrosive reagents; namely nitric acid (HNO_{3}) and hydrogen fluoride (HF). Furthermore, stain-etching is useful if one needs to produce a very thin porous Si films. A publication in 1960 by R. J. Archer revealed that it is possible to create stain films as thin as 25 Å through stain-etching with HF-HNO_{3} solution.

=== Bottom-Up Synthesis ===
Porous silicon can be synthesized chemically from silicon tetrachloride, using self-forming salt byproducts as templates for pore formation. The salt templates are later removed with water.

== Drying of porous silicon ==
Porous silicon is systematically prone to presence of cracks when the water is evaporated. The cracks are particularly evident in thick or highly porous silicon layers. The origin of the cracks has been attributed to the large capillary stress due to the minute size of the pores. In particular, it has been known that cracks will appear for porous silicon samples with thickness larger than a certain critical value. Bellet concluded that it was impossible to avoid cracking in thick porous silicon layers under normal evaporating conditions. Hence, several appropriate techniques have been developed to minimize the risk of cracks formed during drying.

Supercritical drying

Supercritical drying is reputed to be the most efficient drying technique but is rather expensive and difficult to implement. It was first implemented by Canham in 1994 and involves superheating the liquid pore above the critical point to avoid interfacial tension.

Freeze drying

Freeze drying procedure was first documented around 1996. After the formation of porous silicon, the sample is frozen at a temperature of about 200 K and sublimed under vacuum.

Pentane drying

The technique uses pentane as the drying liquid instead of water. In doing so the capillary stress is reduced because pentane has a lower surface tension than water.

Slow evaporation

Slow evaporating technique can be implemented following the water or ethanol rinsing. It was found that slow evaporation decreased the trap density.

== Physical properties of porous silicon ==
Physical parameters describing PS are pore diameter, pore density and thickness of the porous layer. During formation of porous silicon layer by means of anodization of a Si wafer, these parameter can be controlled by the Si resistivity, HF concentration, current density and etching time. It is possible to create several porous layers with different pore densities and diameters of the pores on the same substrate by etching with different current densities.

=== Porosity ===
Porosity is defined as volume fraction of voids within the PS layer and can be determined easily by weight measurement. The porosity of PS may range from 4% for macroporous layers to 95% for mesoporous layers. A study by Canham in 1995 found that "a 1 μm thick layer of high porosity silicon completely dissolved within a day of in-vitro exposure to a simulated body fluid". It was also found that a silicon wafer with medium to low porosity displayed more stability. Hence, the porosity of PS is chosen according to its potential application areas. The porosity of PS is a macroscopic parameter and doesn't yield any information regarding the microstructure of the layer. It is proposed that the properties of a sample are more accurately predicted if the pore size and pore distribution within the sample can be obtained.

== Optical properties ==
PS demonstrates optical properties based on porosity and complex refractive indices of Si and the medium inside the pores. Effective refractive index of PS can be modelled by means of effective medium approximations (EMA). Usually generalised Bruggeman model is used. If the refractive index of the medium inside pores is high, the effective refractive index of PS will be high as well. This phenomenon causes the spectrum to shift towards longer wavelength.

== Classification of porous silicon ==
Porous silicon is classified into three categories according to the size of its pores: macroporous, mesoporous, and microporous.

Type	Microporous	Mesoporous	Macroporous
Pore diameter (nm)	less than 2	between 2 and 50	larger than 50

== Surface modification of porous silicon ==
The surface of porous silicon may be modified to exhibit different properties. Often, freshly etched porous silicon may be unstable due to the rate of its oxidation by the atmosphere or unsuitable for cell attachment purposes. Therefore, it can be surface modified to improve stability and cell attachment

=== Surface modification improving stability ===
Following the formation of porous silicon, its surface is covered with covalently bonded hydrogen. Although the hydrogen coated surface is sufficiently stable when exposed to inert atmosphere for a short period of time, prolonged exposure render the surface prone to oxidation by atmospheric oxygen. The oxidation promotes instability in the surface and is undesirable for many applications. Thus, several methods were developed to promote the surface stability of porous silicon.

An approach that can be taken is through thermal oxidation. The process involves heating the silicon to a temperature above 1000 C to promote full oxidation of silicon. The method reportedly produced samples with good stability to aging and electronic surface passivation.

Porous silicon exhibits a high degree of biocompatibility. The large surface area enables organic molecules to adhere well. It degrades to Orthosillicic acid (H_{4}SiO_{4}), which causes no harm to the body. This has opened potential applications in medicine such as a framework of the growth of bone.

=== Surface modification improving cell adhesion ===
Surface modification can also affect properties that promote cell adhesion. One particular research in 2005 studied the mammalian cell adhesion on the modified surfaces of porous silicon. The research used rat PC12 cells and Human Lens Epithelial (HLE) cells cultured for four hours on the surface modified porous silicon. Cells were then stained with vital dye FDA and observed under fluorescence microscopy. The research concluded that "amino silanisation and coating the pSi surface with collagen enhanced cell attachment and spreading".

== Key characteristics of porous silicon ==
=== Highly controllable properties ===
Porous silicon studies conducted in 1995 showed that the behaviour of porous silicon can be altered in between "bio-inert", "bioactive" and "resorbable" by varying the porosity of the silicon sample. The in-vitro study used simulated body fluid containing ion concentration similar to the human blood and tested the activities of porous silicon sample when exposed to the fluids for prolonged period of time. It was found that high porosity mesoporous layers were completely removed by the simulated body fluids within a day. In contrast, low to medium porosity microporous layers displayed more stable configurations and induced hydroxyapatite growth.

=== Bioactive ===
The first sign of porous silicon as a bioactive material was found in 1995. In the conducted study, it was found that hydroxyapatite growth was occurring on porous silicon areas. It was then suggested that "hydrated microporous Si could be a bioactive form of the semiconductor and suggest that Si itself should be seriously considered for development as a material for widespread in vivo applications." Another paper published the finding that porous silicon may be used a substrate for hydroxyapatite growth either by simple soaking process or laser-liquid-solid interaction process.

Since then, in-vitro studies have been conducted to evaluate the interaction of cells with porous silicon. A 1995 study of the interaction of B50 rat hippocampal cells with porous silicon found that B50 cells have clear preference for adhesion to porous silicon over untreated surface. The study indicated that porous silicon can be suitable for cell culturing purposes and can be used to control cell growth pattern.

=== Non-toxic waste product ===
Another positive attribute of porous silicon is the degradation of porous silicon into monomeric silicic acid (SiOH4). Silicic acid is reputed to be the most natural form of element in the environment and is readily removed by kidneys.

The human blood plasma contains monomeric silicic acid at levels of less than 1 mg Si/L, corresponding to the average dietary intake of 20–50 mg/day. It was proposed that the small thickness of silicon coatings presents minimal risk to a toxic concentration being reached. The proposal was supported by an experiment involving volunteers and silicic-acid drinks. It was found that concentration of the acid rose only briefly above the normal 1 mg Si/L level and was efficiently expelled by urine excretion.

=== Superhydrophobicity ===
The simple adjustment of pore morphology and geometry of porous silicon also offers a convenient way to control its wetting behavior. Stable ultra- and superhydrophobic states on porous silicon can be fabricated and used in lab-on-a-chip, microfluidic devices for the improved surface-based bioanalysis.

== See also ==
- Nanocrystalline silicon
- Silicon
- Porosity
- Quantum wire
- Etching (microfabrication)
