= Osamu Terasaki =

Japanese physicist and electron microscopist

- Born: Yamaguchi, Japan
- Known for: Electron-microscopy structure determination of zeolites and mesoporous materials
- Awards: Donald W. Breck Award (2007, 2019); Humboldt Research Award (2008)
- Scientific career
- Fields: Electron microscopy, electron crystallography
- Workplaces: Tohoku University; Stockholm University; ShanghaiTech University

Osamu Terasaki (born 1943) is a Japanese physicist who works on electron microscopy and electron crystallography, particularly the structure determination of nanoporous crystals such as zeolites, mesoporous silica and metal–organic frameworks. He has held faculty positions at Tohoku University, Stockholm University and ShanghaiTech University. He is a member of the Academia Europaea.

== Early life and education ==
Terasaki was born in Yamaguchi, Japan, in 1943. He studied physics at Tohoku University, where he received a BSc in 1965 and an MSc in 1967 for work on magnetism. He received a DSc from Tohoku University in 1982 for a thesis on ordered structures and incommensurability in gold-based alloys.

== Career ==
Terasaki joined the Department of Physics at Tohoku University in 1967. He was an assistant professor from 1967 to 1994, associate professor and head of the Microstructure Physics group from 1994 to 2002, and professor from 2002 to 2003. He was also a Royal Society guest research fellow at the University of Cambridge with John Meurig Thomas, and spent four months as a guest professor at Lund University.

Beginning in fiscal year 1995, he was a research director in the Core Research for Evolutional Science and Technology (CREST) programme of the Japan Science and Technology Agency, Directing the project "New Arrayed Clusters in Microporous Materials: Syntheses, Structures and Physical Properties".

In 2003 he moved to Stockholm University as professor and head of structural chemistry. The journal Solid State Sciences published a special issue of papers from a conference held in his honour. He was an invited guest professor at KAIST and a visiting professor at the University of California, Berkeley. He later joined ShanghaiTech University as professor and director of its Centre for High-resolution Electron Microscopy.

== Research ==
Terasaki's research uses transmission electron microscopy, electron diffraction and electron crystallography to determine the structures of nanoporous and electron-beam-sensitive crystals. His doctoral research is about ordered structures and incommensurability in gold-based alloys. His later work has focused on zeolites and other porous materials.

In 1999 Terasaki and co-workers reported the structure of the nanocrystalline zeolite SSZ-48 solved from electron diffraction data. The framework was later assigned the code SFE by the International Zeolite Association. In 2000 his group used electron microscopy to image directly the pores and cages of three-dimensional mesoporous silicas.He and Keiichi Miyasaka combined electron crystallography with curvature assessment to determine the structures of mesoporous crystals.

With Yanhang Ma and others, he developed an electron-crystallography method for determining the handedness of individual zeolite nanocrystals. His group has also used in situ X-ray diffraction to locate gas molecules adsorbed in metal–organic frameworks. He has worked with Omar M. Yaghi on the structural characterisation of metal–organic and covalent organic frameworks.

== Awards and honours ==
- 1993: Seto Award, Japanese Society of Electron Microscopy
- 1996: Daiwa Adrian Prize
- 2003: Friendship Award, State Administration of Foreign Experts Affairs, China
- 2007: Donald W. Breck Award, International Zeolite Association (shared with Lynne B. McCusker and Christian Baerlocher)
- 2008: Humboldt Research Award
- 2010: Honorary member, Scandinavian Electron Microscopy Society
- 2014: Honorary member, Japan Association of Zeolites
- 2018: Magnolia Silver Award, Shanghai Municipal People's Government
- 2019: Donald W. Breck Award, International Zeolite Association (shared)
- 2020: Member, Academia Europaea
- 2025: Science and Technology Award, Tohoku University International Award
