= Charles T. Kresge =

American inorganic chemist (born 1954)

- Born: 9 March 1954 (age 72)
- Education: Swarthmore College (B.S. in chemistry, 1975), University of California, Santa Barbara (Ph.D. in physical chemistry, 1979)
- Known for: The discovery and commercialization of mesoporous molecular sieves.
- Awards: Donald W. Breck Award (1994), Thomas Alva Edison Patent Award (2008), Election to the US National Academy of Engineering (2007)
- Scientific career
- Fields: American Industrial Chemist
- Workplaces: Saudi Aramco; The Dow Chemical Company
- Thesis: Equilibrium and Kinetic Studies of the Protonation and Deprotonation of Some Transition Metal Complexes (1979)
- Doctoral advisor: Ralph G. Pearson

Charles T. Kresge is a chemist and retired Chief Technology Officer (CTO) of Saudi Aramco. He was R&D Vice President at the Dow Chemical Company. His area of expertise is inorganic synthesis, and his primary field of research is in the area of crystalline aluminosilicate materials, particularly for the discovery of mesoporous molecular sieves.

Kresge was elected a member of the National Academy of Engineering in 2007 for his contributions to the rational design and engineering of mesoporous inorganic materials.

== Education ==
Kresge received his bachelor's in chemistry from Swarthmore College in 1975 and his Ph.D. from the University of California at Santa Barbara in 1979. His graduate career began at Northwestern University, where he began working with Ralph Pearson. He followed Pearson when he took an appointment at UCSB. His thesis study was "Equilibrium and Kinetic Studies of the Protonation and Deprotonation of Some Transition Metal Complexes".

== Advancements to chemistry ==
Kresge is known primarily for the discovery, characterization, and commercial application of a number of significant families of microporous and mesoporous materials. He is most recognized for his discovery of the mesoporous silica given the designation MCM-41. He is also the inventor of the MCM-36, MCM-56, MCM-67 and MCM-68 compositions of matter. The paper that appeared in the journal Nature describing the MCM-41 materials is one of the most cited chemistry papers of all time. and the American Chemical Society referred to their discovery as one of the most important discoveries in chemistry The discovery of MCM-41 is widely cited. Nature, in celebration of its sesquicentennial anniversary, selected Kresge's 1992 paper one of the "10 extraordinary papers" published over the last 150 years.

He is an inventor on 64 issued US patents, numerous foreign patents, and has 47 publications. He has over 50 invited lectureships, including The Robert A. Welch Foundation Invited Lectureship in Nanochemistry and the National Chemical Laboratory of Pune, India's Doctor Paul Ratnasamy Endowment lecture.

== Positions held ==
- Past Chair of the Gordon Research Conferences on Zeolitic and Layered Materials
- Board of the Mesoporous Materials Association
- Board of the International Zeolite Association
- Chemical Engineering Advisory Board at the University of California, Santa Barbara
- National Academies National Research Council Board on Chemical Sciences and Technology
- Board of the International Congress on Catalysis
- Member of the Council of the Gordon Research Conferences
- Member of the Chemical Sciences Roundtable of the United States National Research Council
- Guest Editor of Current Chemistry: Current Opinion in Colloid and Interface Science
- Member of the Editorial Board of the Journal of Solid State Chemistry
- Member of the Editorial Board of Advanced Functional Materials.

== Awards and achievements ==
Kresge has been issued over 60 US patents, been featured in 48 scientific publications, and is the editor of one book. His awards include the Donald W. Breck Award in 1994 and the Thomas Alva Edison Award in 2008. He was also honored by election to the US National Academy of Engineering (2007). In 2011, he was Honorary Chair of the 22nd North American Catalysis Society meeting in Detroit, Michigan.

== Career ==
=== Mobil ===
- 1979–1985 – started as a research chemist in the Catalyst Synthesis & Development Group in Paulsboro, New Jersey. Went on to hold research positions focused on the discovery, development, and commercialization of processes and catalytic materials.
- 1987–1993 – head of the Exploratory Synthesis & Characterization Group at Mobil's Paulsboro Laboratory.
- 1993–1997 – head of Mobil's activities for catalyst synthesis, characterization, and applications at Mobil's Princeton and Paulsboro Research Laboratories
- 1997–1999 – technology leader and chief scientist for exploratory materials chemistry research at Mobil, including being a senior member of the technical leadership for the Strategic Research Center, Mobil Technology Company

=== W.R. Grace ===
- 1985–1987 – Group Head, Fluid catalytic cracking Research

=== Dow Chemical ===
- April 1999 – Joined Dow Chemical as Global R&D Director for Catalysis in Corporate R&D.
- 2003 – R&D Vice President, Basic Plastics and Chemicals, Hydrocarbons& Energy and Licensing
- 2006 – R&D Vice President, Basic Plastics, Hydrocarbons & Energy, Chemicals, Licensing and Core R&D
- 2010 – R&D Vice President for Feedstocks, Elastomers, Telecommunications, Olefins, Aromatics & Alternatives, Packaging, H&M, Licensing & Catalyst and A&FM Technology
- 2013 – Retired from Dow Chemical effective October 1, 2013.

=== Saudi Aramco ===
- 2013 – Chief Technology Officer effective October 24, 2013.
