= Molecular sieve =

Filter material with homogeneously sized pores in the nanometer range

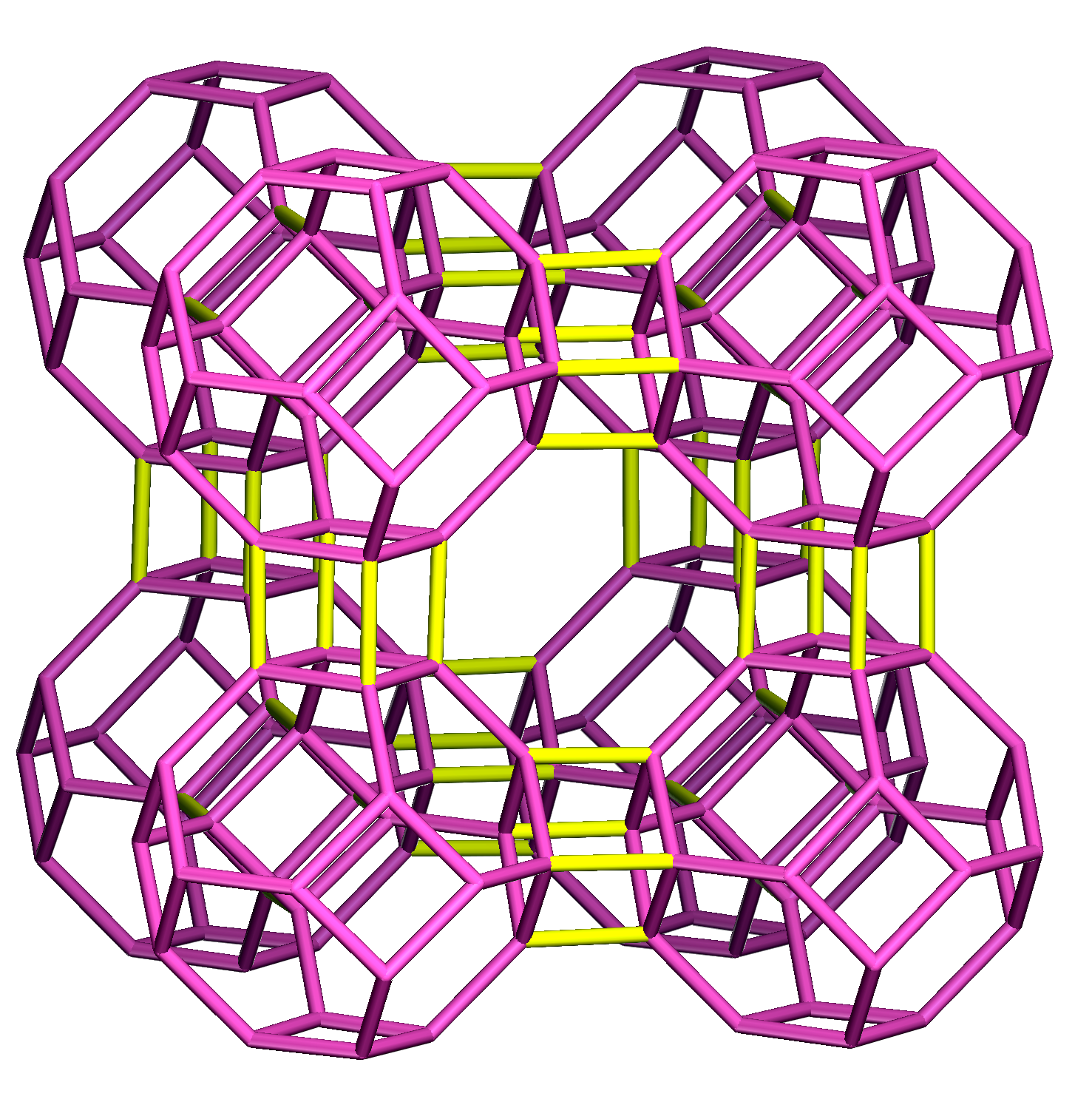
Typical molecular sieves are of the LTA type. They feature sodium aluminosilicates cages (sodium not shown) that have high affinity for water.

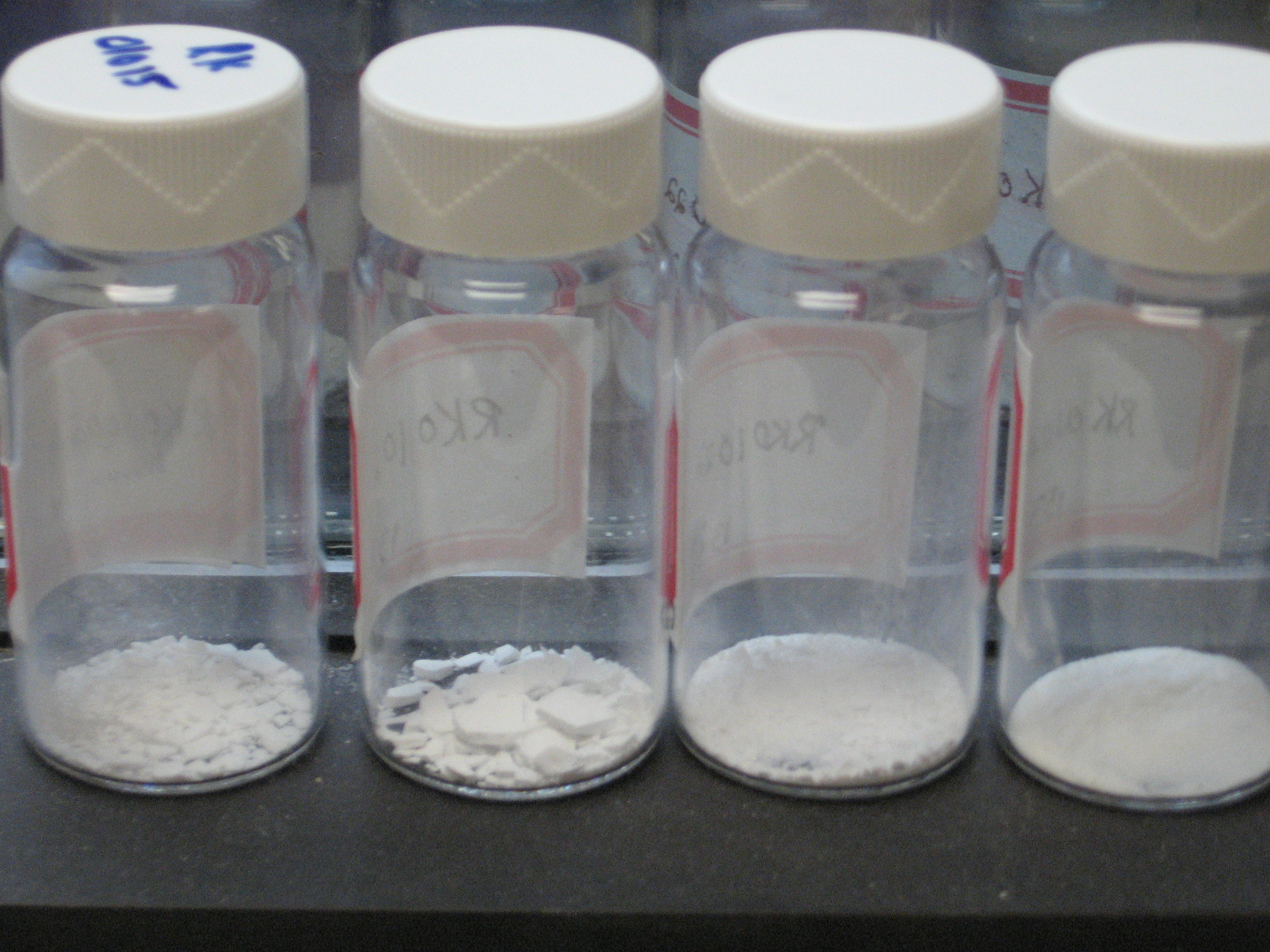
Vials of mesoporous silica

A molecular sieve is a material with pores of uniform size comparable to that of individual molecules, linking the interior of the solid to its exterior. These materials embody the molecular sieve effect, in which molecules larger than the pores are preferentially sieved, allowing for the selective adsorption of specific compounds based on their molecular size. (Note: "With respect to porous solids, the surface associated with pores communicating with the outside space may be called the internal surface. Because the accessibility of pores may depend on the size of the fluid molecules, the extent of the internal surface may depend on the size of the molecules comprising the fluid, and may be different for the various components of a fluid mixture.") Many kinds of materials exhibit some molecular sieves, but zeolites dominate the field. Zeolites are almost always aluminosilicates, or variants where some or all of the Si or Al centers are replaced by similarly charged elements.

== Sieving process ==
The diameters of the pores that comprise molecular sieves are similar in size to small molecules. Large molecules cannot enter or be adsorbed, while smaller molecules can. As a mixture of molecules migrates through the stationary bed of porous, semi-solid substance referred to as a sieve (or matrix), the components of the highest molecular weight (which are unable to pass into the molecular pores) leave the bed first, followed by successively smaller molecules. Most of molecular sieves are aluminosilicates (zeolites) with Si/Al molar ratio less than 2, but there are also examples of activated carbon and silica gel.

The pore diameter of a molecular sieve is measured in ångströms (Å) or nanometres (nm). According to IUPAC notation, microporous materials have pore diameters of less than 2 nm (20 Å) and macroporous materials have pore diameters of greater than 50 nm (500 Å); the mesoporous category thus lies in the middle with pore diameters between 2 and 50 nm (20–500 Å).

The sieving properties of molecular sieves are classified as

- microporous (3-20 Å pores) including zeolite A, LTA, and FAU. Some clays, active carbon, and porous glass meet this criterion.
- mesoporous materials (2–50 nm pores), e.g., in the form of Silicon dioxide (used to make silica gel): 24 Å (2.4 nm)
- macroporous materials (> 50 nm pores)

== Applications ==
Some molecular sieves are used in size-exclusion chromatography, a separation technique that sorts molecules based on their size.

Another important use is as a desiccant. They are often used in the petrochemical industry for drying gas streams. For example, in the liquid natural gas (LNG) industry, the water content of the gas needs to be reduced to less than 1 ppmv to prevent blockages caused by ice or methane clathrate.

Molecular sieves are also widely used as desiccants in drying and humidity-control applications for moisture-sensitive devices (MSD) like semiconductors used in electronic manufacturing because of their strong affinity for water and selective absorption properties.

=== Laboratory use ===
In the laboratory, molecular sieves are used to dry solvents. Molecular sieves have proven to be superior to traditional drying techniques, which often employ aggressive desiccants.

Under the term zeolites, molecular sieves are used for a wide range of catalytic applications. They catalyze isomerisation, alkylation, and epoxidation, and are used in large scale industrial processes, including hydrocracking and fluid catalytic cracking.

They are also used in the filtration of air supplies for breathing apparatus, for example those used by scuba divers and firefighters. In such applications, air is supplied by an air compressor and is passed through a cartridge filter which, depending on the application, is filled with molecular sieve or activated carbon, finally being used to charge breathing air tanks. Such filtration can remove particulates and compressor exhaust products from the breathing air supply.

=== FDA approval ===
The US FDA has as of April 1, 2012, approved sodium aluminosilicate for direct contact with consumable items under 21 CFR 182.2727. Prior to this approval the European Union had used molecular sieves with pharmaceuticals and independent testing suggested that molecular sieves meet all government requirements but the industry had been unwilling to fund the expensive testing required for government approval.

== Regeneration ==
Methods for regeneration of molecular sieves include pressure change (as in oxygen concentrators), heating and purging with a carrier gas (as when used in ethanol dehydration), or heating under high vacuum. Regeneration temperatures range from 175 to 315 °C (350 to 600 °F) depending on molecular sieve type. In contrast, silica gel can be regenerated by heating it in a regular oven to 120 °C (250 °F) for two hours. However, some types of silica gel will "pop" when exposed to enough water. This is caused by breakage of the silica spheres when contacting the water.

== Adsorption capabilities ==
Name	Alias	Pore diameter (Ångström)	Bulk density (g/mL)	Adsorbed water (% w/w)	Attrition or abrasion, W (% w/w)	Usage
3A	A-3, K-A	3	0.60–0.68	19–20	0.3–0.6	Desiccation of petroleum cracking gas and alkenes, selective adsorption of H_{2}O in insulated glass (IG) and polyurethane, drying of ethanol fuel for blending with gasoline.
4A	A-4, Na-A	4	0.60–0.65	20–21	0.3–0.6	Adsorption of water in sodium aluminosilicate which is FDA approved (see below) used as molecular sieve in medical containers to keep contents dry and as food additive having E-number E-554 (anti-caking agent); Preferred for static dehydration in closed liquid or gas systems, e.g., in packaging of drugs, electric components and perishable chemicals; water scavenging in printing and plastics systems and drying saturated hydrocarbon streams. Adsorbed species include SO_{2}, CO_{2}, H_{2}S, C_{2}H_{4}, C_{2}H_{6}, and C_{3}H_{6}. Generally considered a universal drying agent in polar and nonpolar media; separation of natural gas and alkenes, adsorption of water in non-nitrogen sensitive polyurethane
5A-DW		5	0.45–0.50	21–22	0.3–0.6	Degreasing and pour point depression of aviation kerosene and diesel, and alkenes separation
5A small oxygen-enriched		5	0.4–0.8	≥23		Specially designed for medical or healthy oxygen generator
5A	A-5, Ca-A	5	0.60–0.65	20–21	0.3–0.5	Desiccation and purification of air; dehydration and desulfurization of natural gas and liquid petroleum gas; oxygen and hydrogen production by pressure swing adsorption process
10X	F-9, Ca-X	8	0.50–0.60	23–24	0.3–0.6	High-efficient sorption, used in desiccation, decarburization, desulfurization of gas and liquids and separation of aromatic hydrocarbon
13X	F-9, Na-X	10	0.55–0.65	23–24	0.3–0.5	Desiccation, desulfurization and purification of petroleum gas and natural gas
13X-AS		10	0.55–0.65	23–24	0.3–0.5	Decarburization and desiccation in the air separation industry, separation of nitrogen from oxygen in oxygen concentrators
Cu-13X	Cu-X	10	0.50–0.60	23–24	0.3–0.5	Sweetening (removal of thiols) of aviation fuel and corresponding liquid hydrocarbons

== 3A ==
- Approximate chemical formula: ((K_{2}O)_{2/3} (Na_{2}O)_{1/3}) • Al_{2}O_{3}• 2 SiO_{2} • 9/2 H_{2}O
- Silica-alumina ratio: SiO_{2}/ Al_{2}O_{3}≈2

=== Production ===
3A molecular sieves are produced by cation exchange of potassium for sodium in 4A molecular sieves (See below)

=== Usage ===
3A molecular sieves do not adsorb molecules with diameters larger than 3 Å. The characteristics of these molecular sieves include fast adsorption speed, frequent regeneration ability, good crushing resistance and pollution resistance. These features can improve both the efficiency and lifetime of the sieve. 3A molecular sieves are the necessary desiccant in petroleum and chemical industries for refining oil, polymerization, and chemical gas-liquid depth drying.

3A molecular sieves are used to dry a range of materials, such as ethanol, air, refrigerants, natural gas and unsaturated hydrocarbons. The latter include cracking gas, acetylene, ethylene, propylene and butadiene. 3A molecular sieves are stored at room temperature, with a relative humidity not more than 90%. They are sealed under reduced pressure, being kept away from water, acids and alkalis.

== 4A ==
- Chemical formula: Na_{2}O•Al_{2}O_{3}•2SiO_{2}•9/2H_{2}O
- Silicon-aluminium ratio: 1:1 (SiO_{2}/ Al_{2}O_{3}≈2)

=== Production ===
For the production of 4A sieve, typically aqueous solutions of sodium silicate and sodium aluminate are combined at 80 °C (180 °F). The product is "activated" by "heating" at 400 °C (750 °F) 4A sieves serve as the precursor to 3A and 5A sieves through cation exchange of sodium for potassium (for 3A) or calcium (for 5A)

== Uses ==
The main use of zeolitic molecular sieves is in laundry detergents. In 2001, an estimated 1.2 million tons of zeolite A were produced for this purpose, which entails water softening.

4A molecular sieves are widely used to dry laboratory solvents. They can absorb water and other species with a critical diameter less than 4 Å such as NH_{3}, H_{2}S, SO_{2}, CO_{2}, C_{2}H_{5}OH, C_{2}H_{6}, and C_{2}H_{4}.

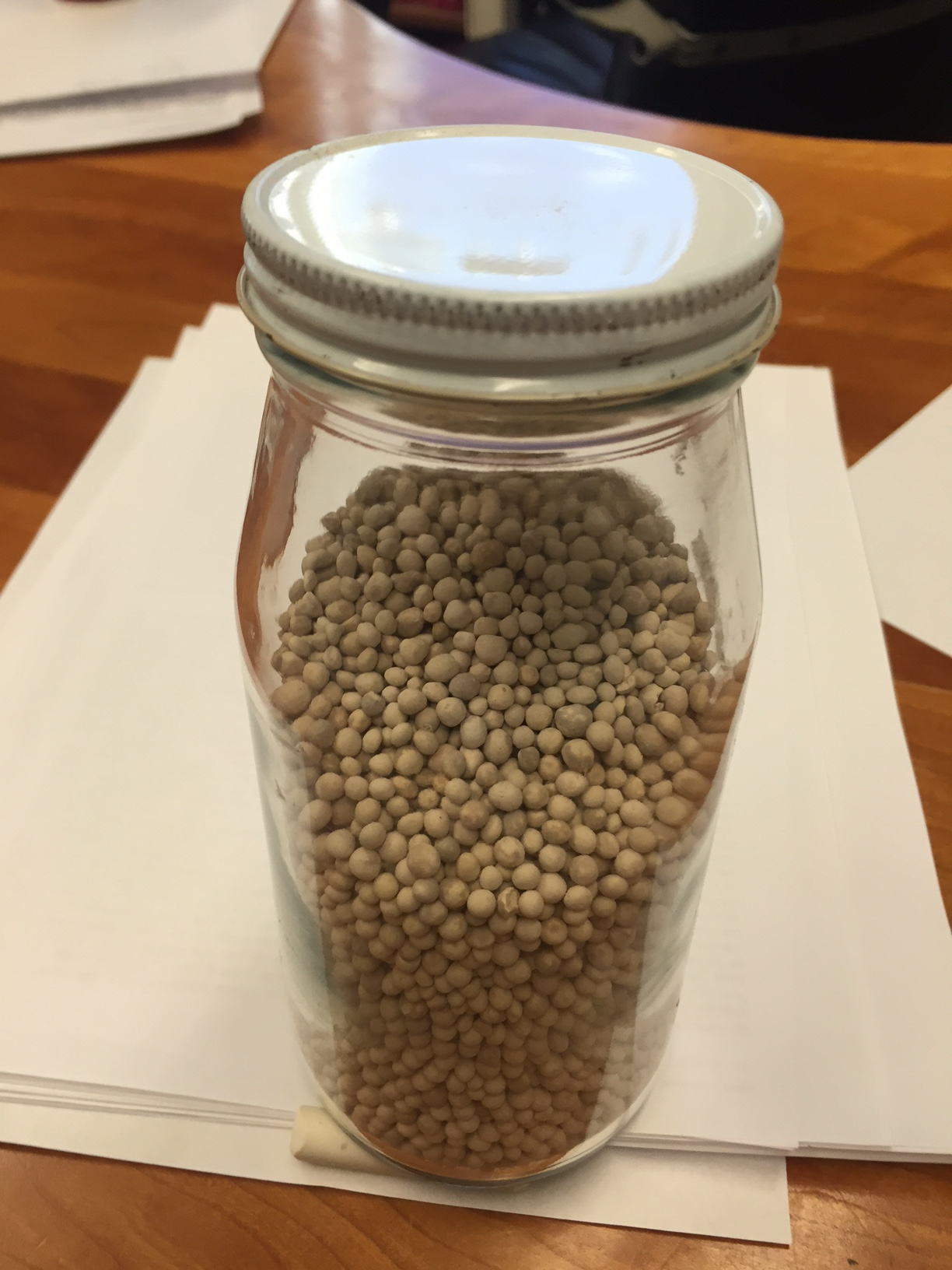
Bottle of 4A molecular sieves

Some molecular sieves are used to assist detergents as they can produce demineralized water through calcium ion exchange, remove and prevent the deposition of dirt. They are widely used to replace phosphorus. The 4A molecular sieve plays a major role to replace sodium tripolyphosphate as detergent auxiliary in order to mitigate the environmental impact of the detergent. It also can be used as a soap forming agent and in toothpaste.

=== Other purposes ===
1. The metallurgical industry: separating agent, separation, extraction of brine potassium, rubidium, caesium, etc.
2. Petrochemical industry, catalyst, desiccant, adsorbent
3. Agriculture: soil conditioner
4. Medicine: load silver zeolite antibacterial agent.

== Morphology of molecular sieves ==
Molecular sieves are available in diverse shape and sizes. Spherical beads have advantage over other shapes as they offer lower pressure drop and are mechanically robust.

== See also ==
- Lime (mineral)
- Mesoporous silicate
