= Mesoporous silica =

Nano-scale porous silica compound

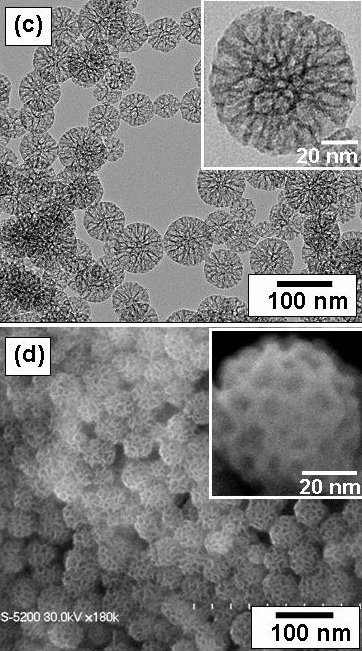
Transmission electron microscopy (TEM, top) and scanning electron microscopy (SEM) images of mesoporous silica nanoparticles.

Mesoporous silica is a form of silica that is characterised by its mesoporous structure, that is, having pores that range from 2 nm to 50 nm in diameter. According to IUPAC's terminology, mesoporosity sits between microporous (<2 nm) and macroporous (>50 nm). Mesoporous silica is a relatively recent development in nanotechnology. The most common types of mesoporous nanoparticles are MCM-41 and SBA-15. Research continues on the particles, which have applications in catalysis, drug delivery and imaging. Mesoporous ordered silica films have been also obtained with different pore topologies.

A compound producing mesoporous silica was patented around 1970. It went almost unnoticed and was reproduced in 1997. Mesoporous silica nanoparticles (MSNs) were independently synthesized in 1990 by researchers in Japan. They were later produced also at Mobil Corporation laboratories and named Mobil Composition of Matter (or Mobil Crystalline Materials, MCM).

Six years later, silica nanoparticles with much larger (4.6 to 30 nanometer) pores were produced at the University of California, Santa Barbara. The material was named Santa Barbara Amorphous type material, or SBA-15. These particles also have a hexagonal array of pores.

The researchers who invented these types of particles planned to use them as molecular sieves. Today, mesoporous silica nanoparticles have many applications in medicine, biosensors, thermal energy storage, water/gas filtration and imaging.

== Synthesis ==
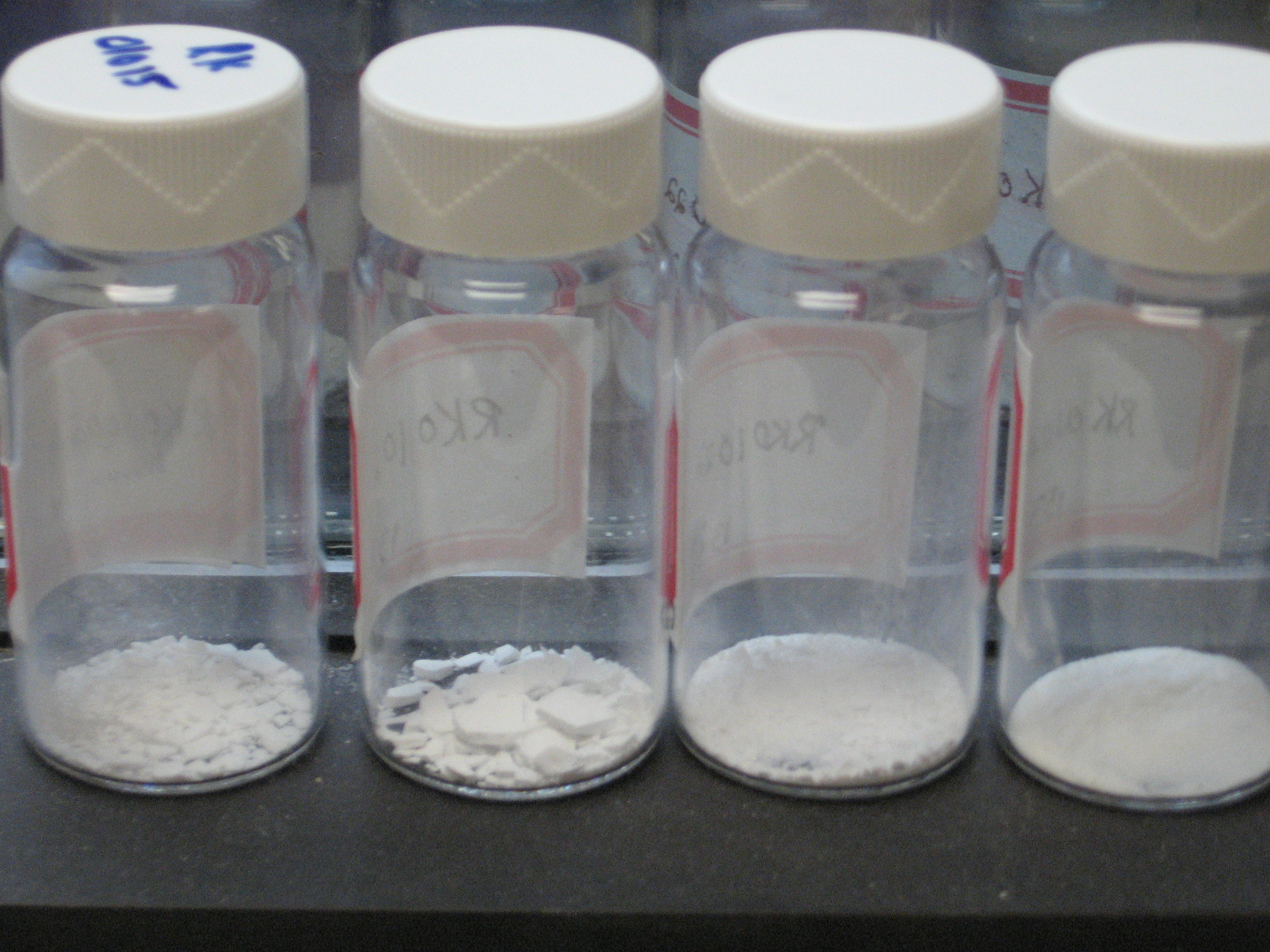
Vials of mesoporous silica

TEM image of a mesoporous silica nanoparticle

Mesoporous silica nanoparticles are synthesized by reacting tetraethyl orthosilicate with a template made of micellar rods. The result is a collection of nano-sized spheres or rods that are filled with a regular arrangement of pores. The template can then be removed by washing with a solvent adjusted to the proper pH.

Mesoporous particles can also be synthesized using a simple sol-gel method such as the Stöber process, or a spray drying method. Tetraethyl orthosilicate is also used with an additional polymer monomer (as a template).

However, TEOS is not the most effective precursor for synthesizing such particles; a better precursor is (3-Mercaptopropyl)trimethoxysilane, often abbreviated to MPTMS. Use of this precursor drastically reduces the chance of aggregation and ensures more uniform spheres.

== Drug delivery ==
The large surface area of the pores allows the particles to be filled with a drug or a cytotoxin. Like a Trojan Horse, the particles will be taken up by certain biological cells through endocytosis, depending on what chemicals are attached to the outside of the spheres. Some types of cancer cells will take up more of the particles than healthy cells will, giving researchers hope that MCM-41 will one day be used to treat certain types of cancer.

Ordered mesoporous silica (e.g. SBA-15, TUD-1, HMM-33, and FSM-16) also show potential to boost the in vitro and in vivo dissolution of poorly water-soluble drugs. Many drug-candidates coming from drug discovery suffer from a poor water solubility. An insufficient dissolution of these hydrophobic drugs in the gastrointestinal fluids strongly limits the oral bioavailability. One example is itraconazole which is an antimycoticum known for its poor aqueous solubility. Upon introduction of itraconazole-on-SBA-15 formulation in simulated gastrointestinal fluids, a supersaturated solution is obtained giving rise to enhanced transepithelial intestinal transport. Also the efficient uptake into the systemic circulation of SBA-15 formulated itraconazole has been demonstrated in vivo (rabbits and dogs). This approach based on SBA-15 yields stable formulations and can be used for a wide variety of poorly water-soluble compounds.

== Biosensors ==
The structure of these particles allows them to be filled with a fluorescent dye that would normally be unable to pass through cell walls. The MSN material is then capped off with a molecule that is compatible with the target cells. When the MSNs are added to a cell culture, they carry the dye across the cell membrane. These particles are optically transparent, so the dye can be seen through the silica walls. The dye in the particles does not have the same problem with self-quenching that a dye in solution has. The types of molecules that are grafted to the outside of the MSNs will control what kinds of biomolecules are allowed inside the particles to interact with the dye.

== Concrete and cementitious materials ==
Mesoporous silica nanoparticles (MSNs) have been investigated as very low-dosage additives in Portland cement systems to accelerate early hydration and improve early-age performance. At dosages typically below about 0.6% by mass of cement, MSNs act mainly through seeding and pozzolanic effects, which are associated with a shorter induction period, higher early heat release, faster setting, and refinement of the capillary pore structure, leading to increases in 1-day strength without adverse effects on fresh-state workability at those levels. Findings from related studies on MCM-41 type mesoporous silica in cement matrices are consistent with these observations and report early-age microstructural densification and strength gains. Reported benefits are dosage-dependent and type-dependent, and higher contents can be counterproductive; large-scale cost and durability in aggressive environments remain active topics for further study.

== See also ==
- Mesoporous material
- Mesoporous silicates
