= Potting soil =

Medium in which to grow plants

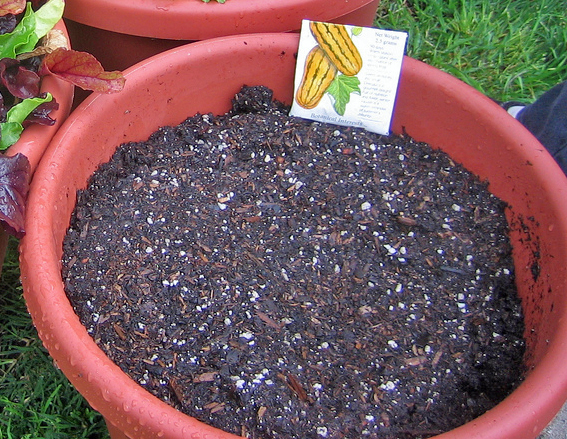
A flowerpot filled with potting soil

Potting soil or growing media, also known as potting mix or potting compost (UK), is a substrate used to grow plants in containers. The first recorded use of the term is from an 1861 issue of the American Agriculturist.

Despite the name, this mixture typically uses little to no actual soil.

== Materials ==
Materials used in the preparation of growing media include but are not limited to: peat, vermiculite, coconut coir, treebark chips, wood fibers, perlite, mineral wool, small amounts of actual soil, recycled paper fibers, rice hulls, sand and calcined clays.

== Properties ==
Typical potting mixes include one or more materials which retain moisture, one or more materials which aid in aeration and drainage, and fertilizer. Moisture-retaining materials and aerating materials can be combined in any ratio, depending on the particular needs of the plant. Soils are minimally used as growing media because they compact and lose pore space after repeated watering and can be too heavy for growing potted plants. Mediums used for growing plants in pots typically are a mix of organic and inorganic ingredients.

Good growing mediums have a number of properties including moisture and nutrient retention capacity, quick water infiltration, pore space for aeration (plants roots need oxygen), drainage for excess water, decompose slowly, and provide support for the plants growing in them. They also have an optimal range of pH, cation exchange properties, and lack substance that are toxic to plants These are also dependent on the type of plant grown since there is wide variation in moisture and nutrient needs among different plants.

=== Moisture retention ===
This part is usually made up of peat (usually with limestone to reduce acidity) or coconut coir. It serves to absorb water and nutrients. Tree bark, mainly of pine, may also be used.

The use of peat is controversial since the harvesting of peat moss from peatlands (which includes unique habitats such as bogs and fens) can degrade these peatlands. Peatlands are home to a diverse range of plant and animal species. Peat also has a very slow accumulation rate, as little as 1mm per year, so they take a long time to regenerate. Peatlands are also carbon sinks, constituting 3% of the world's surface but storing up to 30% of the carbon sequestered in the soil. The removal of the layer of CO_{2} absorbing plants releases CO_{2} into the atmosphere, contributing to climate change.

As such, alternatives such as coconut coir are available.

=== Drainage ===
Sand and grit may be used for drainage and aeration. Perlite and vermiculite improve both aeration and water retention.

=== Nutrients and chemistry ===
All plants need essential plant nutrients to grow, so it is important to make sure there is a sufficient amount in the potting soil. Some nutrients may be already present in the bulking ingredients. Peat contains 1% nitrogen that is almost never released. Limestone (for raising pH) contains mostly calcium (calcite), but can also contain magnesium (dolomitic). The latter is preferred as it supplies both elements. A typical proportion of limestone to peat is 8.5 pounds per cubic yard (5.0 kg/m^{3}). Coir contains a high amount of electrolytes (salts). In fact, untreated coir contains too much sodium and potassium for plant growth, so it is washed and then buffered (partially replacing salts with other minerals, usually calcium and magnesium) to produce the growth medium. Vermiculite contains some calcium and magnesium, but more importantly it helps retain water and nutrients in the porous structure.

Nutrients not supplied by the bulk will need to be supplied by the fertilizer. In conventional mixes they may be slow-release formulae of synthetic fertilizers, while organic mixes will use organic source such as compost (e.g. leaf mold, bark compost or recycled mushroom compost). Overuse of fertilizers will, as with in normal soils, risk damaging the plant. For compost, the maximum recommended amount is 1 part compost to 1 part bulking material.

A soil test may be done to analyze the chemistry of a potting mix, despite the mix not necessarily being made of soil. As an approximation for indoor home planting, the mix is generally treated as greenhouse growth medium. The main method is a saturated media extract (SME), which tests the chemical contents of a water extract of the mix.

Reference levels for potting mix by the SME method (Note: UVM data from the 1980s. An extended and updated (~1995) version of this table may be found from UConn. Significant variation in reference ranges is possible due to procedural differences, so it is recommended to use the test provider's values.)
Analysis	Acceptable, min	Optimum, min	Optimum, max	Acceptable, max
Soluble salt, mS/cm (Note: May be also written mmhos/cm using the "mho" synonym of S (siemens).)	0.75	2.0	3.5	5.0
Nitrate-N, ppm (Note: Generally written mg/L in newer sources.)	40	100	200	299
Phosphorus, ppm	3	6	9	18
Calcium, ppm	80	200	—N/a	—N/a
Magnesium, ppm	30	70	—N/a	—N/a

== Different mixes for different uses ==
The growth medium should be adapted to each plant's (and growth stage's) preference for aeration, drainage, nutrition, and pH.

For seed starting, a "germination mix" is typically light-weight and suitable for starting small-seeded plants. A "seed starting" mix is suitable for larger seeded crops. Following early growth, most plants prefer a potting mix that is more well-draining.

Cacti and succulents require sharp drainage, thus requiring a much larger percentage of perlite or sand. Carnivorous plants, such as the Venus flytrap and the pitcher plant, prefer the nutrient-poor, acidic soils common to bogs and fens, while water-based plants thrive in a heavier topsoil mix.

Potting soil and other soilless growing media are commonly used for propagating plants from stem cuttings. Cuttings generally develop better root systems when rooted in a soil-less potting mix than when propagated in water. Suitable media include perlite, vermiculite, sand and sphagnum moss. Cuttings are inserted into pre-moistened medium and kept moist while rooting, with high humidity maintained to encourage root development.

== Sterilization ==
Commercially available potting soil is usually sterilized, in order to avoid the spread of weeds and plant diseases.

Legionnaires' disease outbreaks due to potting mix have been reported in Australia, New Zealand, the Netherlands, the United States, and Japan.

== See also ==
- Agricultural soil science
- Compost
- Container garden
  - Category: Garden vases
  - Sub-irrigated planter
- Good agricultural practice
- Houseplant
- Mulch
- Soil biology
- Soil science
- Substrate
- Topsoil
