= Katsumi Kaneko =

Japanese chemist

- Born: Yokohama, Japan
- Education: Yokohama National University (BE); The University of Tokyo (PhD)
- Awards: Received Charles Petinos Award (2007); Fellow of Chemical Society of Japan (2011)
- Scientific career
- Fields: Nanospaces and Nanoporous materials
- Workplaces: Shinshu university
- Website: soar-rd.shinshu-u.ac.jp/profile/en.HafNZVyC.html

Katsumi Kaneko is a Japanese chemist and professor of Shinshu University.

== Education ==
He was born in Yokohama (Kanagawa), Japan. He graduated with a Bachelor of Engineering degree in 1969 from Yokohama National University (Applied Chemistry), Yokohama. He received a master's degree in physical chemistry at The University of Tokyo, in 1971. He received Doctor of Science in solid state chemistry in 1978 for submitted thesis from The University of Tokyo, entitled “Electrical Properties and Defect Structures of Iron Hydroxide Oxide Colloids”.

He worked in Chiba University as a faculty of science until 2010, later he studied surface chemistry of metal hydroxide oxides and on gas adsorption, nanoporous materials, and nanospaces molecular science. Later, he became the dean of faculty of science and graduate school of science and technology of Chiba University.

He is now a distinguished professor of Shinshu University since 2010.

== Research and career ==
He developed accurate characterization method of nanoscale pores with gas adsorption and established new nanospaces-molecular science; he found unusual in-pore high pressure effect of nanoscale pores in which molecules and/or atoms prefer to form high pressure phase even without compression. One representative example of the in-pore high pressure effect is spontaneous formation of atomically 1D sulfur-chain of metallic property inside carbon nanotube under vacuum. Also he found partial dehydration of ions by confinement of ions in nanoscale pores, being essential to understand the supercapacitors.

He gave a reasonable clue, cluster- associated hydrophobic-to-hydrophilic transformation, to understand water adsorption of nanoporous carbons of hydrophobicity hydration. He contributed to understand adsorption of supercritical gases such as NO, CH_{4}, and H_{2} on nanoporous materials. He introduced the concept of quasi-vaporization of supercritical gases through an intensive molecule-pore interaction, giving an efficient guideline for improving adsorption of supercritical gases. He has developed an efficient separation route of isotopic gases such as ^{18}O_{2} and ^{16}O_{2}. He evidenced partial breaking of Coulombic law in electrically conductive carbon pores to induce association of cations or anions. He developed a sol-gel dispersant of single wall carbon nanotube, producing highly transparent conductive films and stretchable electrodes.

== Awards and honors ==
He was awarded by Chemical Society of Japan in 1999 and the Charles Petinos Award by the American Carbon Society in 2007. He is fellow of Chemical Society of Japan since 2011, Royal Society of Chemistry and International Adsorption Society since 2013, and a Senior Member of the AIChE.

== Publications ==
1. Ujjain, Sanjeev Kumar; Bagusetty, Abhishek; Matsuda, Yuki; Tanaka, Hideki; Ahuja, Preety; de Tomas, Carla; Sakai, Motomu; Vallejos-Burgos, Fernando; Futamura, Ryusuke; Suarez-Martinez, Irene; Matsukata, Masahiko (2021-01-22). "Adsorption separation of heavier isotope gases in subnanometer carbon pores". Nature Communications. 12 (1): 546. Bibcode:2021NatCo..12..546U. doi:10.1038/s41467-020-20744-6. ISSN 2041-1723. PMC 7822881. PMID 33483513.
2. Morris, Russell E.; Wheatley, Paul S. (2008-06-23). "Gas Storage in Nanoporous Materials". Angewandte Chemie International Edition. 47 (27): 4966–4981. doi:10.1002/anie.200703934. PMID 18459091.
3. Vallejos-Burgos, Fernando; Coudert, François-Xavier; Kaneko, Katsumi (2018-05-04). "Air separation with graphene mediated by nanowindow-rim concerted motion". Nature Communications. 9 (1): 1812. Bibcode:2018NatCo...9.1812V. doi:10.1038/s41467-018-04224-6. ISSN 2041-1723. PMC 5935753. PMID 29728605.
4. Futamura, Ryusuke; Iiyama, Taku; Takasaki, Yuma; Gogotsi, Yury; Biggs, Mark J.; Salanne, Mathieu; Ségalini, Julie; Simon, Patrice; Kaneko, Katsumi (December 2017). "Partial breaking of the Coulombic ordering of ionic liquids confined in carbon nanopores". Nature Materials. 16 (12): 1225–1232. Bibcode:2017NatMa..16.1225F. doi:10.1038/nmat4974. ISSN 1476-4660. PMC 5702543. PMID 28920938.
5. Kaneko, Kastumi (March 2015). "Water capture in carbon cuboids". Nature Chemistry. 7 (3): 194–196. doi:10.1038/nchem.2193. ISSN 1755-4349. PMID 25698326.
6. Fujimori, Toshihiko; Morelos-Gómez, Aarón; Zhu, Zhen; Muramatsu, Hiroyuki; Futamura, Ryusuke; Urita, Koki; Terrones, Mauricio; Hayashi, Takuya; Endo, Morinobu; Young Hong, Sang; Chul Choi, Young (2013-07-12). "Conducting linear chains of sulphur inside carbon nanotubes". Nature Communications. 4 (1): 2162. Bibcode:2013NatCo...4.2162F. doi:10.1038/ncomms3162. ISSN 2041-1723. PMC 3717502. PMID 23851903.
7. Kondo, Atsushi; Noguchi, Hiroshi; Ohnishi, Shunsuke; Kajiro, Hiroshi; Tohdoh, Aya; Hattori, Yoshiyuki; Xu, Wei-Chun; Tanaka, Hideki; Kanoh, Hirofumi; Kaneko, Katsumi (2006-11-01). "Novel Expansion/Shrinkage Modulation of 2D Layered MOF Triggered by Clathrate Formation with CO_{2} Molecules". Nano Letters. 6 (11): 2581–2584. Bibcode:2006NanoL...6.2581K. doi:10.1021/nl062032b. ISSN 1530-6984. PMID 17090095.
8. Ohkubo, Takahiro; Konishi, Takehisa; Hattori, Yoshiyuki; Kanoh, Hirofumi; Fujikawa, Takashi; Kaneko, Katsumi (2002-10-01). "Restricted Hydration Structures of Rb and Br Ions Confined in Slit-Shaped Carbon Nanospace". Journal of the American Chemical Society. 124 (40): 11860–11861. doi:10.1021/ja027144t. ISSN 0002-7863. PMID 12358524.
