= MCM-41 =

Catalyst or catalyst support material

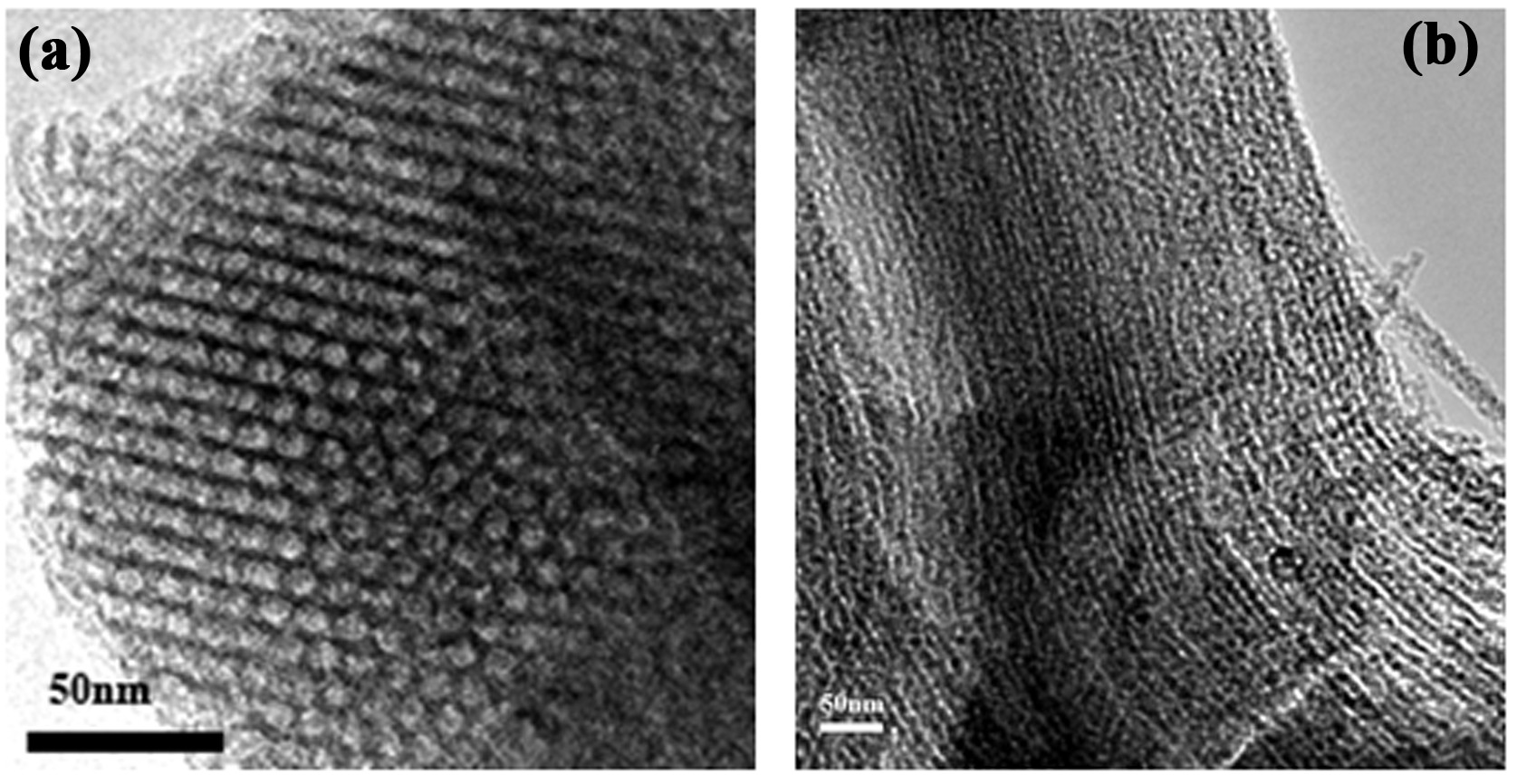
Nitrogen-containing ordered mesoporous carbon with the MCM-41 structure: electron microscopy images taken (a) along and (b) perpendicular to the channel direction.

MCM-41 (Mobil Composition of Matter No. 41) is a mesoporous material with a hierarchical structure from a family of silicate and aluminosilicate solids that were first developed by researchers at Mobil Oil Corporation and that can be used as catalysts or catalyst supports.

== Structure ==
MCM-41 consists of a regular arrangement of cylindrical mesopores that form a one-dimensional pore system. It is characterized by an independently adjustable pore diameter, a sharp pore distribution, a large surface and a large pore volume. The pores are larger than with zeolites and the pore distribution can easily be adjusted. The mesopores have a diameter of 2 nm to 6.5 nm.

== Properties ==
Contrary to zeolites, the framework of MCM-41 has no bronsted acid centers because there is no aluminium contained in the lattice. The acidity of alumina-doped MCM-41 therefore is comparable to that of amorphous aluminosilicates.

MCM-41 is not hydrothermally stable because of the slight wall thickness and the low degree of cross-linking of the silicate units.

== Synthesis ==
To achieve a defined pore diameter surfactants are used that form micelles in the synthesis solution. These micelles form templates that help build up the mesoporous framework. For MCM-41 mostly cetyltrimethylammonium bromide (CTAB) is used.

The surfactant first forms rod-like micelles that subsequently align into hexagonal arrays. After adding silica species these cover the rods. Later, calcination leads to a condensation of the silanol groups so that the silicon atoms are bridged by oxygen atoms. The organic template is oxidized and disappears.

== Uses ==
MCM-41, as the zeolites, are widely used as catalytic cracking. MCM-41 type materials have been widely used as support of heterogeneous catalysts and also used for separations.
