= Mesoporous silicate =

Mesoporous silicates are ordered materials with a defined pore size of 2-50 nm that are formed from silicate-based precursors. Mesoporous silicates are an emerging field of interest in nanoscience due to their high surface areas, larger pore size in comparison to microporous materials, and the order of their structure. Since their first synthesis in 1992 by the Mobil Oil Corporation, mesoporous silicates have been researched for potential use in catalysis, molecular sieving (separation), chemical sensing, energy storage, and biomedical applications.

SEM image of MCM-48 mesoporous silica nanoparticles, by the Oliver Research Group, Santa Cruz, California

== Background ==
=== History of development ===
The history of porous silica material development dates back to the discovery of zeolites (crystalline aluminosilicates) in 1756. The main disadvantage of zeolites, for molecular sieving and catalysis, was their microscale pore size. The discovery of a new family of mesoporous molecular sieves in the early 1990s by Kuroda et al., known as KSW-1 and FSM-16, and by ExxonMobil, called M41S, opened new possibilities to prepare catalysts for reactions of relatively large molecules. Ensuing research work has focused on the tunability of mesoporous silicate morphology and pore size, as well as the modification of pore walls and the silicate surface to adjust surface properties.

=== Features and classification ===
Mesoporous materials consist of an inorganic or organic skeleton that supports an ordered porous structure. In mesoporous silicates, this skeleton is made up of a network of tetrahedral SiO_{4} molecules. Silicate-based materials benefit from being chemically inert and from their surfaces being easily modifiable with functional groups. Porous materials are classified according to IUPAC standards by the pore size, pore shape, and adsorption properties. IUPAC standards require that for a material to be classified as mesoporous, it must have a pore size of 2-50 nm. Under 2nm would constitute a microporous material, and above 50 nm would constitute a macroporous material. The size constraints of mesopores allow for both a high surface area (greater than 1,000 m^{2}/g) and pore volume (greater than 1 cm^{3}/g) while maintaining control over selectivity, especially with synthesis methods (such as chemical etching, rather than the typical sol-gel and liquid crystal templating methods) that allow for tunable pore size.

=== Structure ===
The M41S materials as discovered and characterized by the Mobil group occur in three main structures: lamellar, hexagonal, and cubic. These structures are defined by the way the pores are ordered. The MCM-50 mesoporous silicate material has a lamellar or layered structure, with the pores situated in stacked sheets. The MCM-41 mesoporous silicate material has a hexagonal structure made up of tightly packed cylindrical rods. The MCM-48 mesoporous silicate material is made up of a system of pore channels packed in a cubic structure. While ordered mesoporous silicates typically take one of these three structures, as they are stable and reliably synthesized, other materials have been developed with different particle shapes and pore characteristics, such as the SBA-15 materials of 1998, which features larger pores and thicker pore walls. The morphology of mesoporous silicates is controlled by adjusting synthesis parameters, like temperature, pH, and concentration, as well as the template surfactant used to direct the silicate precursors into an ordered structure.

A: MCM-41 (hexagonal), B: MCM-48 (cubic), and C: MCM-50 (lamellar) mesoporous silicate materials

== Synthesis ==
=== Sol-gel method ===
Mesoporous silicate materials are primarily synthesized using the sol-gel method, which is preferred due to its easily available raw precursors and much lower reaction temperature than previous methods, as well as the high tunability of pore size and other structural properties. In the sol-gel method, a colloidal suspension, called a sol, is converted into a gel, defined as a non-fluid network with a continuous liquid phase. The sol-gel process consists of a series of hydrolysis and condensation reactions that result in gel networks of polysilicate chains, and the final morphology of the material depends on the reaction conditions of the sol-gel transformation and optional structural templates, including surfactants, small molecules, and polymers.

General sol-gel reaction scheme from alkoxysilanes

=== Liquid crystal templating ===
The liquid crystal templating (LCT) mechanism defines a self-assembly mechanism for silicate mesoporous materials during which surfactant micelles direct the formation of the material. The LCT mechanism can be used to produce hexagonal, lamellar, and cubic arrangements of mesoporous silicate materials. Layers of silicate precursor form around the surfactant micelles, whose packing is determined by energetic favorability.

=== Other methods ===
A microwave-assisted hydrothermal process produces silicate mesoporous materials with much less crystallization time than other methods. The assembly of silane precursors is aided by both heat and microwave radiation. The chemical etching method is used to produce silicate mesoporous materials that are hollow and have highly dispersed, size-tunable pores. In a process adjacent to the LCT method, layered silicate precursors are used to create both crystalline and amorphous mesoporous silicate materials.

Following synthesis of the desired mesoporous silicate material, both organic and inorganic materials have been used to functionalize the pore walls of silicate mesoporous materials to allow for specialized use in a broad range of applications.

== Potential applications ==
Porous inorganic solids have found great utility as catalysts and sorption media because of their large internal surface area, i.e. the presence of voids of controllable dimensions at the atomic, molecular, and nanometer scales. With increasing environmental concerns worldwide, nanoporous materials have become more important and useful for the separation of polluting species and the recovery of useful ones. In recent years there has been great progress in applying environmentally friendly zeolites in heterogeneous reaction catalysis.

Mesoporous silicates are actively being developed for a variety of applications, including forms of pollution control, chemical sensing, catalysis, functional energy storage, and a range of biomedical uses.

=== Environmental ===
Due to their tunable pore sizes, mesoporous silicate materials show applicability in the separation and removal of pollutants. Surface functionalization also allows for adsorption of inorganic and organic pollutants, especially in aqueous environments. The high surface area and adsorption properties of mesoporous silicate materials give them utility in a variety of chemical sensing applications, including humidity, metal ion, pH, and small molecule sensing. This is accomplished by measuring changes in conductivity, modification with pH indication dyes, and with specialized coatings tuned for metal ion adsorption.

=== Catalysis ===
Catalytic applications of mesoporous silicates are made possible due to the materials’ high surface area and uniform pores. The surface Si-OH (silanol) groups are easy to functionalize and use as metal anchors, a catalytic applications are often aided by the incorporation of metal into the mesoporous silicate material.

=== Biological and medicine ===
Functionalizing the pore walls of mesoporous silicate materials allows for them to be used in biological and medical applications, particularly in drug delivery mechanisms. Organic molecules can adhere to surface silanol groups to aid in site specificity and finely tune release kinetics at the point of delivery. Other surface functionalization has allowed the development of mesoporous silicates for enzyme immobilization, allowing for repeated catalysis and recovery of enzymes.

=== Energy ===
More recent research in silicate mesoporous materials is aimed at functionalizing the surface for sustainable energy storage. Mesoporous silicates have proved useful in enhancing lithium ion batteries and the proton exchange membrane in fuel cells, primarily due to their high material stability and larger, accessible pores.

== See also ==
- High-performance liquid chromatography
- Gas-liquid chromatography
- Silica gel
- Nanotechnology
