= Leigh Canham =

British scientist

Leigh Canham is a British scientist who has pioneered the optoelectronic and biomedical applications of porous silicon.

Leigh Canham graduated from University College London in 1979 with a BSc in Physics and completed his PhD at King's College London in 1983.

His early work in this area took place at the Royal Signals and Radar Establishment in Malvern, Worcestershire. Canham and his colleagues showed that electrochemically etched silicon could be made porous. This porous material could emit visible light when a current was passed through it (electroluminescence). Later the group demonstrated the biocompatibility of porous silicon.

Canham now works as Chief Scientific Officer of psiMedica (part of pSiVida). According to the pSiVida web site, Canham is the most cited author on porous silicon. In a study of most cited physicists up to 1997 Canham ranked at 771.

== Bibliography ==
=== Selected papers ===
- Porous silicon-based scaffolds for tissue engineering and other biomedical applications, Jeffery L. Coffer, Melanie A. Whitehead, Dattatri K. Nagesha, Priyabrata Mukherjee, Giridhar Akkaraju, Mihaela Totolici, Roghieh S. Saffie, Leigh T. Canham, Physica Status Solidi A Vol. 202, Issue 8, Pages 1451 - 1455
- Gaining light from silicon, Leigh Canham, Nature vol. 408, pp. 411 – 412 (2000) doi:10.1038/35044156
- Progress towards silicon optoelectronics using porous silicon technology, L. T. Canham, T. I. Cox, A. Loni and A. J. Simons, Applied Surface Science, Volume 102, Pages 436-441 (1996)
- Porous silicon multilayer optical waveguides, A. Loni, L. T. Canham, M. G. Berger, R. Arens-Fischer, H. Munder, H. Luth, H. F. Arrand and T. M. Benson, Thin Solid Films, Vol. 276, Issues 1-2, pages 143-146 (1996)
- The origin of efficient luminescence in highly porous silicon, K. J. Nash, P. D. J. Calcott, L. T. Canham, M. J. Kane and D. Brumhead, J. of Luminescence, Volumes 60-61, Pages 297-301 (1994)
- Electronic quality of vapour phase epitaxial Si grown at reduced temperature, W. Y. Leong, L. T. Canham, I. M. Young and D. J. Robbins, Thin Solid Films, Volume 184, Issues 1-2, pages 131-137 (1990)
- Silicon quantum wire array fabrication by electrochemical and chemical dissolution of wafers, L. T. Canham, Applied Physic Letters, Volume 57, pages 1046-1048 (1990)

=== Books ===
- Properties of Porous Silicon, Leigh Canham (Ed.) Inspec/IEE (1997) ISBN 0-85296-932-5
- Biomedical Mems: Clinical Applications of Silicon Technology, Leigh Canham, Inst of Physics Pub Inc (2003) ISBN 0-7503-0921-0

=== Selected patents ===
- US patent 6,322,895
- US patent 5,561,304
