= Mobil Composition of Matter =

Mobil Composition of Matter (MCM) is the initial name given for a series of mesoporous materials that were first synthesized by Mobil's researchers in 1992. MCM-41 (Mobil Composition of Matter No. 41) and MCM-48 (Mobil Composition of Matter No. 48) are two of the most popular mesoporous molecular sieves that are keenly studied by researchers.

The most striking fact about the MCM-41 and MCM-48 is that, although composed of amorphous silica wall, they possess long range ordered framework with uniform mesopores. These materials also possess large surface area, which can be up to more than 1000 m^{2}g^{−1}. Moreover, the pore diameter of these materials can be nicely controlled within mesoporous range between 1.5 and 20 nm by adjusting the synthesis conditions and/or by employing surfactants with different chain lengths in their preparation.

MCM-41 and MCM-48 have been applied as catalysts for various chemical reactions, as a support for drug delivery system and as adsorbent in waste water treatment.

MCM-41 is a material similar to FSM-16.
