= Pore structure =

Micro CT of porous medium: Pores of the porous medium shown as purple color and impermeable porous matrix shown as green-yellow color.

Pore structure is a common term employed to characterize the porosity, pore size, pore size distribution, and pore morphology (such as pore shape, surface roughness, and tortuosity of pore channels) of a porous medium. Pores are the openings in the surfaces impermeable porous matrix which gases, liquids, or even foreign microscopic particles can inhabit them. The pore structure and fluid flow in porous media are intimately related.

With micro nanoscale pore radii, complex connectivity, and significant heterogeneity, the complexity of the pore structure affects the hydraulic conductivity and retention capacity of these fluids. The intrinsic permeability is the attribute primarily influenced by the pore structure, and the fundamental physical factors governing fluid flow and distribution are the grain surface-to-volume ratio and grain shape.

The idea that the pore space is made up of a network of channels through which fluid can flow is particularly helpful. Pore openings are the comparatively thin sections that divide the relatively large portions known as pore bodies. Other anatomical analogies include "belly" or "waist" for the broad region of a pore and "neck" or "throat" for the constrictive part. Pore bodies are the intergranular gaps with dimensions that are generally significantly smaller than those of the surrounding particles in a medium where textural pore space predominates, such as sand. On the other hand, a wormhole can be regarded as a single pore if its diameter is practically constant over its length.

Such pores can have one of three types of boundaries: (1) constriction, which is a plane across the locally narrowest part of the pore space; (2) interface with another pore (such as a wormhole or crack); or (3) interface with solid.

== Porosity ==
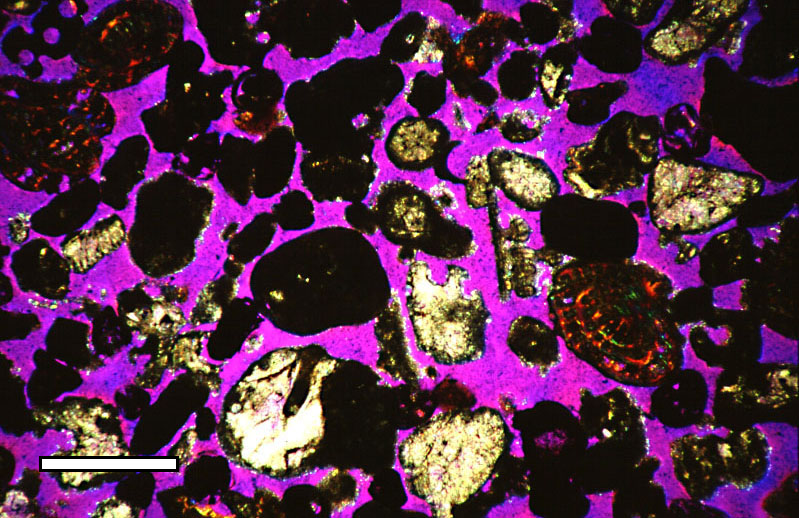
Porosity shown as purple color(Thin section under gypsum plate of microscopic carbonate grains). Scale bar 500 micrometres.

The proportion of empty space in a porous media is called porosity. It is determined by dividing the volume of the pores or voids by the overall volume. It is expressed as a percentage or as a decimal fraction between 0 and 1. Porosity for the majority of rocks ranges from less than 1% to 40%.

Porosity influences fluid storage in geothermal systems, oil and gas fields, and aquifers, making it evident that it plays a significant role in geology. Fluid movement and transport across geological formations, as well as the link between the bulk properties of the rock and the characteristics of particular minerals, are controlled by the size and connectivity of the porous structure.

=== Measuring porosity ===
The samples' total volume and pore space volume were measured to calculate the porosities.

Measuring pore space volume

A helium pyrometer was used to calculate the volume of the pores and relied on Boyle's law. (P_{1}V_{1}=P_{2}V_{2}) and helium gas, which easily passes through tiny holes and is inert, to identify the solid fraction of a sample. A sample chamber with a known volume is where the core is put. Pressure is applied to a reference chamber with a known volume. The helium gas may now go from the reference chamber to the sample chamber thanks to the connection between the two rooms. The volume of the sample solid is calculated using the ratio between the starting and final pressures. The pore volume, as calculated by the helium pycnometer, is the difference between the total volume and the solid volume.

== Pore size and pore size distribution ==
=== Pore size ===
Typically, the effective radius of the pore body or neck is used to define the size of pores. The position, shape, and connection of pores in solids are only a few of their numerous attributes and the most straightforward aspect of a pore to visualize is likely its size, or its extent in a single spatial dimension.

In comparison to other factors like pore shape, it is arguable that pore size has the biggest or broadest impact on the characteristics of solids. Therefore, using pore size or pore size distribution to describe and contrast various porous substances is definitely convenient and valuable.

The three main pore size ranges (The current classification of pore size recommended by the International Union of Pure and Applied Chemistry) are as following:

Main pore size ranges.
Micropore	Pore width smaller than 2 nm
Mesopores	Pore width between 2 and 50 nm
Macropore	Pore width greater than 50 nm

=== Pore size distribution ===
The relative abundance of each pore size in a typical volume of soil is represented by the pore size distribution. It is represented by the function f(r), whose value is proportional to the total volume of all pores whose effective radius is within an infinitesimal range centered on r. And f(r) can be thought to have textural and structural components.

==== Measuring pore size distribution ====
Mercury intrusion porosimetry and gas adsorption are common techniques for determining the pore size distribution of materials and power sources.

When studying the pore size distribution using the gas adsorption technique using the nitrogen or argon adsorption isotherm at their boiling temperatures, it is possible to determine the pore size from the molecular level to a few hundred nm. The pressure sensor's precise constraints and the coolant's temperature stability result in a maximum observed pore size of just a little bit more than 100 nm in a realistic environment.

Mercury porosimetry determines the pore size distribution and quantifies the associated incursion amount by applying pressure to the non-wetting mercury. The pore size may be readily estimated using this method and ranges from a few nm to 1000 m. The material must be robust enough to withstand the pressure since mercury intrusion requires 140 MPa of pressure for pores smaller than 10 nm. Additionally, it uses the idea to determine the pore size of the inkbottle neck.

=== The relation of pore size to pore size distribution ===
The relationship between pore size and pore size distribution in a randomly constructed porous system, is expected to be monotone: bigger pores are connected to larger particles. The relationship between pore size and particle size is complicated by the nonrandom nature of most soils. Big pores may be found in both large and tiny particles, including clays, which promote aggregation and therefore the development of large interaggregate pores. Subdivisions of a pore size distribution in randomly structured media can express more specific characteristics of soils with more complex conceptualizations, such as the hysteresis of soil water retention.

== Pore morphology ==
The pore morphology is the shape, surface roughness, and tortuosity of pore channels representing the liquid and gaseous phases.

=== Tortuosity of pore channels ===
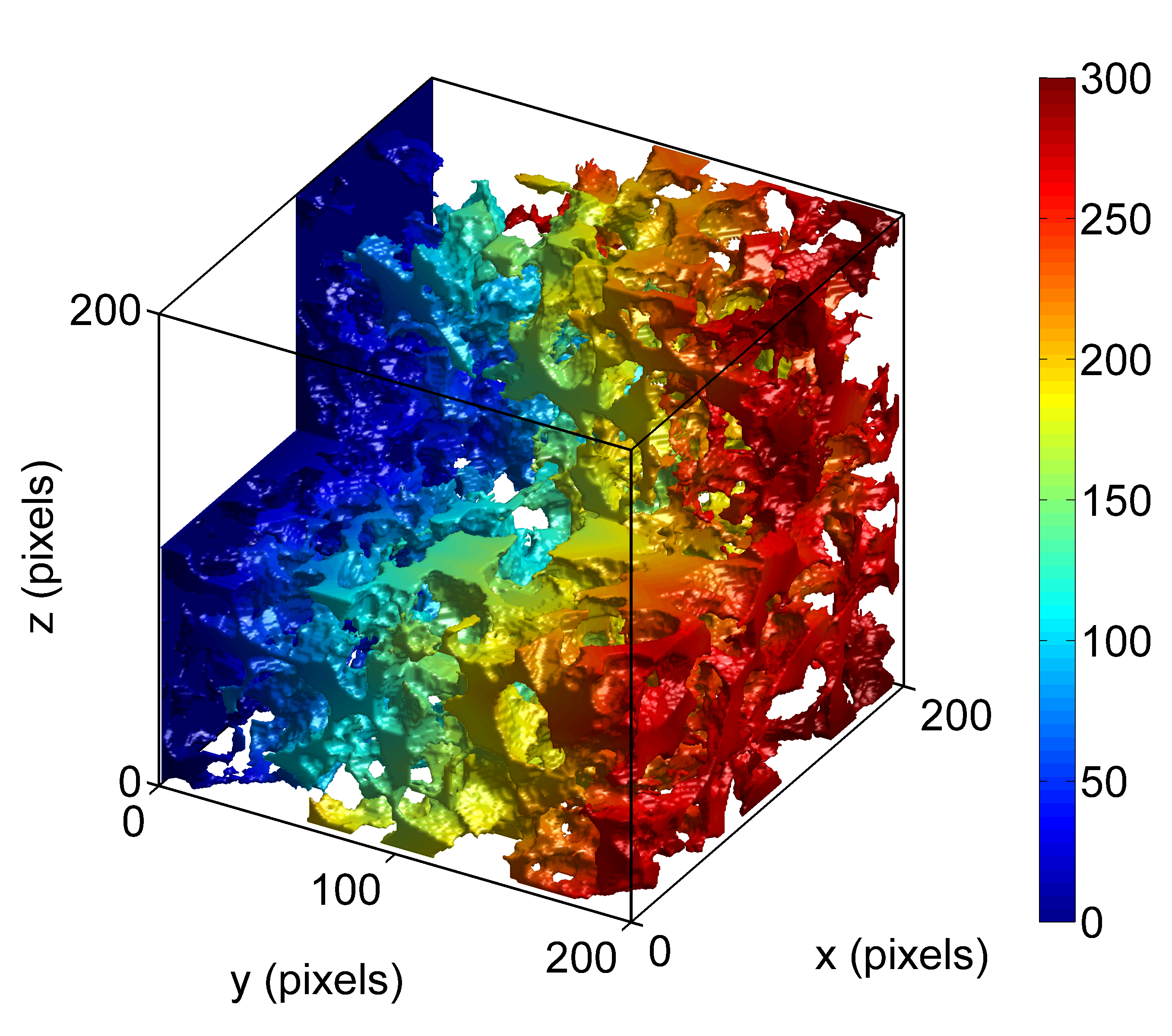
The ratio of the length of the shortest paths between two points witing the pore space to the straight-line distance is the tortuosity, imaged by x-ray microtomography.

Tortuosity of pore channels is a unique geometric quantity that is used not only to measure the transport characteristics of porous system, but also to express the sinuosity and complexity of internal percolation routes.

Toruosity is intimately connected to the transport behavior of electrical conductivity, fluid permeation, molecular diffusion, and heat transfer in geoscience, impacting petrophysical parameters such as permeability, effective diffusivity, thermal conductivity, and formation resistivity factor.

=== Surface roughness ===
The standard definition of surface roughness for porous medium is based on the average measured vertical coordinate value in comparison to a relative surface height, such as root-mean-square roughness or arithmetic roughness. However, the lack of fractal topology consideration led to the relative surface height definition being deemed inadequate in reality.

The ratio of "real surface area" to "geometric smooth-surface area" was used as the second definition of surface roughness. This definition has been applied in several research to alter flow equations or measure the fluid-fluid interfacial area.

The fundamental idea of fractal geometry is where the third definition of surface roughness comes from, in which either modifies the pore surfaces (two-dimensional) or the whole porous medium (three-dimensional) using fractal dimension adjustments, resulting in larger surface dimensions or reduced media dimensions. The hurst roughness exponent, a similar definition, is occasionally used. This quantity, which spans from 0 to 1, is connected to the fractal dimension.

== See also ==
- Bulk density
- Filtration
- Permeability
- Poromechanics
- Porous medium
- Reactive transport modeling in porous media
