= Soil compaction (agriculture) =

Decrease in porosity of soil due to agriculture

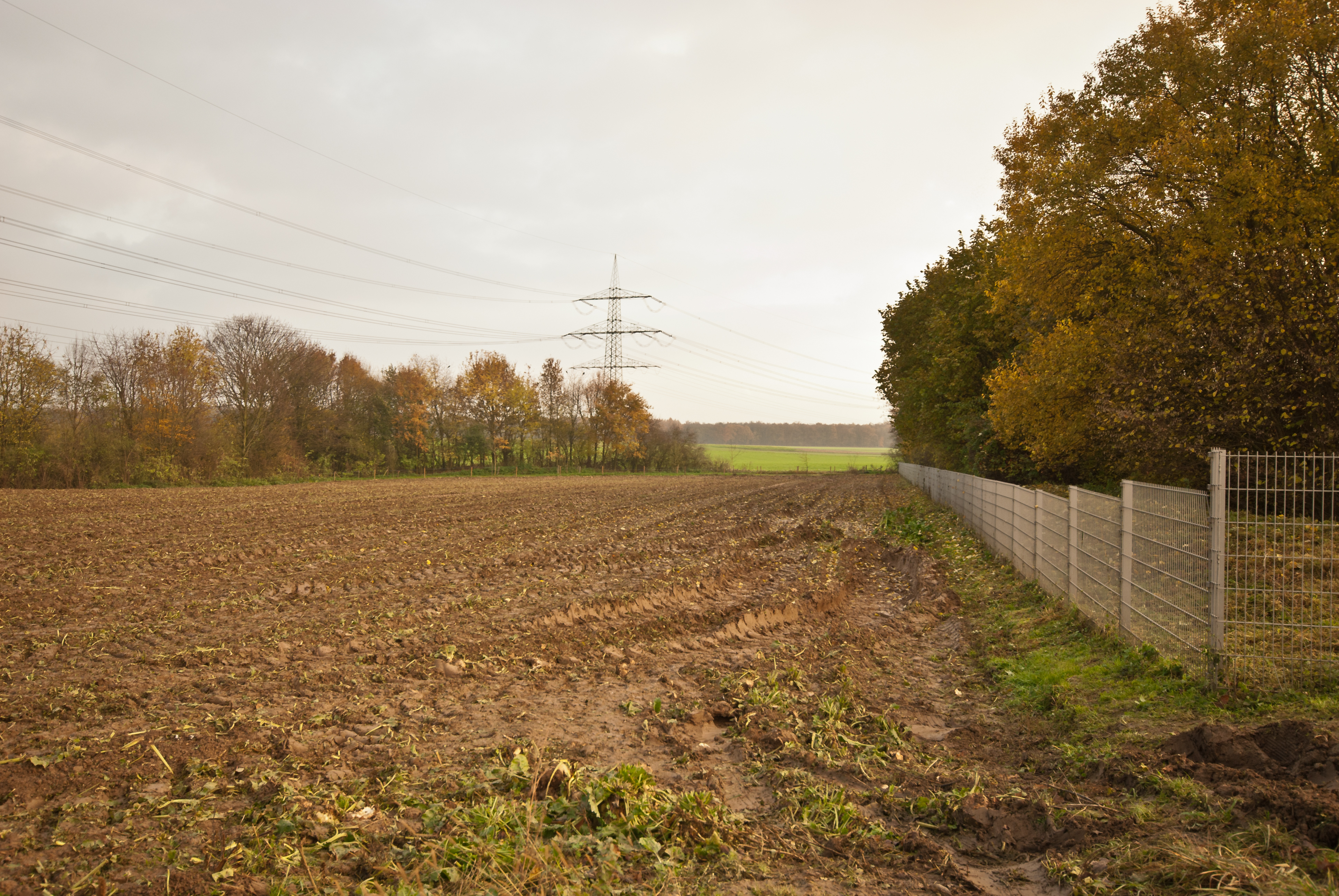
During the sugar beet harvest in late autumn in very moist soil condition, the lanes of agricultural equipment causes soil compaction of the clay soil.

Soil compaction, also known as soil structure degradation, is the increase of bulk density or decrease in porosity of soil due to externally or internally applied loads. Compaction can adversely affect nearly all physical, chemical and biological properties and functions of soil. Together with soil erosion, it is regarded as the "costliest and most serious environmental problem caused by conventional agriculture."

In agriculture, soil compaction is a complex problem in which soil, crops, weather and machinery interact. External pressure due to the use of heavy machinery and inappropriate soil management can lead to the compaction of subsoil, creating impermeable layers within the soil that restrict water and nutrient cycles. This process can cause on-site effects such as reduced crop growth, yield and quality as well as off-site effects such as increased surface water run-off, soil erosion, greenhouse gas emissions, eutrophication, reduced groundwater recharge and a loss of biodiversity.

Unlike salinization or erosion, soil compaction is principally a sub-surface problem and therefore an invisible phenomenon. Special identification methods are necessary to locate, monitor and manage the problem appropriately.

== History and current state ==
Soil compaction is not a recent issue. Before the beginning of mechanized agriculture, the usage of plough-pans was associated with soil compaction. However, multiple studies have shown that modern farming techniques increase the risk of harmful soil compaction.

The historic data basis for global soil compaction is generally very weak as there are only measurements or estimates for certain regions/countries at certain points in time. In 1991, it was estimated that soil compaction accounted for 4% (68.3 million hectares) of anthropogenic soil degradation worldwide. In 2013, soil compaction was regarded a major reason for soil degradation in Europe (appr. 33 million ha affected), Africa (18 million ha), Asia (10 million ha), Australia (4 million ha), and some areas of North America.

More specifically, in Europe approximately 32% and 18% of the subsoils are highly and moderately vulnerable to compaction respectively.

== Mechanism ==
In healthy, well-structured soils, particles interact with each other forming soil aggregates. The resulting soil structure increases in stability with the number of interactions between soil particles. Water and air fills the voids between soil particles, where water interacts with soil particles forming a thin layer around them. This layer can shield particle–particle interaction thus reducing the stability of soil structure.

Mechanic pressure applied to the soil is counterbalanced by an increase of soil particle interactions. This implies a reduction in soil volume by reducing the voids in between soil particles.

As a consequence water and air is displaced and soil bulk density increases, resulting in a reduced permeability for water and air.

Susceptibility of soil to compaction depends on several factors, which influence soil particle interactions:

- Soil texture, with fine textured soils (high clay content) being more susceptible to compaction than coarse textured soils.
- Soil structure, with angular, heterogeneous structures being more stable.
- Soil water content, a high water content increases susceptibility to compaction as the layer of water on the surface of soil particles shields interactions between soil particles
- Initial bulk density, dense soils are more resistant to compaction as the number of particle interactions is higher.
- Organic matter content, increases resistance to compaction as organic matter acts as a buffer, binding minerals and water
- pH, affects net charges of molecules

== Causes ==
Soil compaction can occur naturally by the drying and wetting process called soil consolidation, or when external pressure is applied to the soil. The most relevant human-induced causes of soil compaction in agriculture are the use of heavy machineries, tillage practice itself, inappropriate choice of tillage systems, as well as livestock trampling.

Use of large and heavy machineries for agriculture often causes not only topsoil but subsoil compaction. Subsoil compaction is more difficult to be regenerated than topsoil compaction. Not only may the weight of machineries i.e. axle load, but also velocity and number of passages affect the intensity of soil compaction. Inflation pressure of wheels and tyres also plays an important role for the degree of soil compaction.

Whether heavy machinery is in use or not, tillage practice itself can cause soil compaction. While the major cause of soil compaction in a tillage activity nowadays is due to machineries, the influence of compaction resulting from lighter equipments and animals to the topsoil should not be neglected. Moreover, inappropriate choices of tillage systems may cause unnecessary soil compaction. It should however be noted that tillage activity could reduce topsoil compaction compared to no tillage activity in the long term.

Significant livestock trampling resulting from livestock farming on meadows and agricultural land is also viewed major cause of soil compaction. This is not affected whether the grazing is continuous or short term, however it is affected by the intensity of grazing.

== Effects ==
=== On-site effects ===
Major effects on soil properties due to soil compaction are reduced air permeability and reduced water infiltration. Main physical negative effects to plants are restricted plant root growth in response to the accumulation of the plant hormone ethylene and accessibility of nutrients due to increase in bulk density and reduced soil pore size. This may lead to an extremely dry topsoil and eventually causes soil to crack because the roots absorb water requiring for transpiration from the upper part of the soil where plants can penetrate with their restricted root depth.

Soil chemical properties are influenced by change in soil physical properties. One possible effect is a decrease in oxygen diffusion that causes anaerobic condition. Together with anaerobic condition, increases in soil water saturation can increase denitrification processes in the soil. Possible consequences are an increase in N_{2}O emission, decreases in available nitrogen in soil and reduced efficiency of nitrogen usage by crops. This may cause in an increase of fertilizer use.

Soil biodiversity is also influenced by reduced soil aeration. Severe soil compaction may cause reduced microbial biomass. Soil compaction may not influence the quantity, but the distribution of macro fauna that is vital for soil structure including earthworms due to reduction in large pores.

All these factors affect plant growth negatively, and thus lead to reduced crop yields in most cases. As soil compaction is persistent, loss of crop yield as one of the "soil compaction costs" may lead to a concern of long term economic loss.

=== Off-site effects ===
Soil compaction and its direct effects are closely interrelated with indirect off-site effects that have a global impact, visible only in the long-term perspective. Accumulating effects may result in complex environmental impacts contributing to ongoing global environmental issues such as erosion, flooding, climate change and loss of biodiversity in soil.

==== Food security ====
Soil compaction causes reductions in crop growth, yield and quality. Locally, these effects may have minor impacts on food security. If one aggregates the losses in food supply due to soil compaction, however, compaction may threaten food security. This is especially relevant for regions that are prone to droughts and floodings. Here, compacted soil may contribute to dry topsoil and increased surface runoff. In addition, climate change can worsen adverse of soil compaction. This is because climate change features events such as heat waves and storms that can increase the risk of droughts and floodings and drainage systems.

==== Climate change and energy use ====
Soil stores greenhouse gases (GHG). It is seen as a major terrestrial pool of carbon. Providing nutrient cycling and filtering services, soil regulates GHG fluxes. The loss of gases from soil to the atmosphere is often enhanced by the influence of soil compaction on permeability and changes in crop growth. When compacted soils are waterlogged or have an elevated water content, they tend to cause methane (CH_{4}) losses to the atmosphere due to an increased bacteria activity. The release of the GHG nitrous oxide (N_{2}O) originates also from microbiological processes in soil and is reinforced by the use of nitrogen fertilizer on arable land.

Furthermore, compacted soil requires an extra energy input. More fuel and fertilizer are used for cultivation compared to uncompacted soil due to restrictions in crop growth resulting from a decreased efficiency in nitrogen use. The production of nitrogen fertilizer is highly energy demanding.

==== Erosion, flooding and surface water ====
The reduced permeability of compacted soil can result in local flooding. When water cannot infiltrate, ponding and water logging pose a general risk for soil erosion by water. On compacted soils, wheel tracks are often the starting point for runoff and erosion. Soil erosion is likely to appear on sloping fields or especially hilly land. This might lead to a transfer of sediments [56] . Except for direct negative effects for farmers, the risk of surface runoff close to wheel tracks affects the off-farm environment indirectly, as it for example redistributes "sediment, nutrients and pesticides within the field and beyond". Especially when the risk of surface soil erosion is heightened, eutrophication of surface waters becomes a big problem due to an increased amount of nutrients. On high risk areas, such as wet soils on slopes, applied slurry can runoff easily. This results in a loss of ammonia, which is polluting surface waters, as it creates a lack of oxygen. Leading so to the death of many species, soil erosion caused by compaction is responsible for a decline in habitat quality and therefore species loss.

==== Groundwater ====
Another off-site effect can be seen with regard to groundwater. The infiltration rate of grassland soil without traffic is five times higher than on soil with severe traffic. A consequence might be a reduced recharge of groundwater. Especially in dryer regions suffering from a lack of water reserves, this poses a crucial risk. In regions where "the subsoil provides a significant proportion of the water required by crops to meet transpiration demands", often being dependent on agriculture, this danger of compaction is most present.

Moreover, the amount of fertilizer that is used on compacted soils is more than plants can take up. Thus, the surplus of nitrate in soil tends to leach into groundwater resulting in pollution. Due to a declining filter ability of soil, microbial decomposition of pesticides is restrained and also pesticides are more likely to reach groundwater.

== Identification methods ==
Soil compaction can be identified either in the field, the laboratory or via remote sensing. In order to get reliable data and results a combination of different methods is necessary as "there is no single universal method available to identify compact soils".

=== In the field ===
Phenomena like waterlogging on the surface or in subsurface layers, visible reduction in porosity and changes of soil structure, soil moisture and soil colour are indicators of soil compaction in the field. A blue-grey soil colour and a smell of hydrogen sulphide can occur in the top soil due to extenuated aeration . An increase in soil strength can be measured with a penetrometer, which is basically a device for measuring the resistance of a soil. Another important indicator of soil compaction is the vegetation itself. By means of patterns of crop growth, pale leaf colours and root growth, it is possible to draw conclusions to the extent of compaction. Especially when trying to identify soil compaction in the field with the measurements mentioned above it has been considered particularly important to make a comparison between potentially compacted soil and uncompacted soil nearby.

=== In the laboratory ===
Soil bulk density, pore-size distribution, water permeability and the relative apparent gas diffusion coefficient give a good overview of the permeability of soils to air and water and therefore on the degree of compaction. Since the coarse pores are most important for water infiltration, gas exchange and transport, focusing on them when measuring the porosity and the diffusion coefficient is recommended. Data gained at a laboratory are reliable as long as a certain amount of samples has been analyzed. That is why it is necessary to gather a large number of soil samples throughout the entire sample plot that is of interest.

=== Remote sensing ===
Remote sensing helps to recognize alterations of soil structure, root growth, water storage capacities and biological activity. "Detection of these features directly on the surface of bare soil or indirectly by the vegetation lead to identification of this type of degradation." This is especially helpful for large areas. As a prevention of soil compaction remote sensing can model the susceptibility of soils by considering soil texture, slope value, water regime and economic factors like the type of farming or the machinery being used.

=== Limitations ===
Soil compaction is often local and depends on many factors that may vary within a few square meters. This makes it very hard to estimate susceptibility of soils to compaction at a large scale. Since methods of remote sensing are not able to identify soil compaction directly there are limitations to identification, monitoring and quantifying, especially on a global scale. Identification methods mentioned above are insufficient for large areas since it is not possible to get a large enough sample size without harming the soil and keeping financial afford to a reasonable level.

== Avoidance and mitigation ==
It takes several decades for a partial restoration of compacted soil and therefore it is extremely important to take active measures in order to regenerate soil functions. Since soil compaction is very hard to identify and reverse, special attention has to be paid on avoidance and alleviation.

=== Public policy responses ===
The United Nations General Assembly has agreed to jointly combat land degradation. In particular, member states committed themselves to "use and disseminate modern technology for data collection, transmission and assessment on land degradation".

The European Union addresses soil compaction by means of the Seventh EU Environment Action Programme, which entered into force in 2014. It recognises that soil degradation is a serious challenge and states that by 2020 land is supposed to be managed sustainably in the entire Union.

National governments have regulated agriculture practices in order to mitigate the effect of soil compaction. For instance, in Germany farmers operate under the Federal Soil Conservation Law. The law states that farmers have the obligation of precaution towards soil compaction according to acknowledged good practices. Good practices may vary from case to case, involving a variety of biological, chemical and technical methods.

=== Biological methods ===
The introduction of deep rooting plants is a natural way to regenerate compacted soils. Deep rooting crops provide crop induced wetting and drying cycles that crack the soil, break up impermeable layers of soil by root penetration and increase organic matter. The zaï technique describes a system planting pits that are being dug into poor soil. These pits, with an average diameter of 20–40 cm and a depth of 10–20 cm, are filled with organic matter then seeded after the first rain of the season. This technique conserves soil, captures water, and gradually rehabilitates the structure and health of the underlying soil. A systematic way to regenerate degraded soil (e.g. compacted soil) in the long run is the transformation of conventional farming to agroforestry. Agroforestry systems aim at the stabilization of the annual yield as well as the healthy maintenance of the ecosystem by combining the cultivation of crop plants and trees on the same site.

=== Chemical methods ===
Since soil compaction can lead to a reduced crop growth and therefore to a reduced economic yield the use of fertilizer, especially nitrogen and phosphorus, is increasing. This growing demand causes several problems. Phosphor occurs in marine deposits, magmatic deposits or in guano. Phosphor extracted from marine deposits contains cadmium and uran. Both elements can have toxic effects on soil, plants and hence for humans or animals as consumer.

Another opportunity to increase soil fertility besides from using mineral fertilizer is liming. Through liming the pH level and base saturation should be raised to a level more suitable for microorganisms and especially earth worms in the topsoil. Through an increased activity of soil fauna a loosening of the soil and following a higher porosity and improved water and air permeability should be reached.

=== Technical methods ===
Technical methods mainly aim to reduce and control the pressure applied on soil by heavy machinery. First, the idea of controlled wheel traffic is to separate the wheeled tracks and area for plant rooting. Expected is a reduction of area compacted by tyres, reducing negative effects on crop growth. In some areas, GIS-based technology was introduced to better monitor and control the traffic paths.

Low tyre pressure is another way to distribute the pressure applied on a greater surface and soften the overall pressure. For an integrated management, computer-based modelling of crop yard for vulnerability to compaction is recommended in order to avoid driving over vulnerable soil.

No tillage may contribute to better soil condition as it conserves more water than traditional tillage, however as tillage is a preparation of crop yard for coming seeding or planting process, no tillage does not necessary give a positive result in all cases. Loosening of already compacted soil layers by deep ripping may be beneficial for plant growth and soil condition.

== See also ==
- Land use, land-use change, and forestry
- Soil biology
