= Microporous material =

Material with pores less than 2 nm wide

A microporous material is a material containing pores with typical sizes less than 2 nm in diameter. Microporous materials, like mesoporous materials, are a subset of nanoporous materials. Examples of microporous materials include zeolites and metal-organic frameworks. Porous materials are classified into several kinds by their size. The recommendations of a panel convened by the International Union of Pure and Applied Chemistry (IUPAC) are:

- Microporous materials have pore diameters of less than 2 nm.
- Mesoporous materials have pore diameters between 2 nm and 50 nm.
- Macroporous materials have pore diameters of greater than 50 nm.

Micropores may be defined differently in other contexts. For example, in the context of porous aggregations such as soil, micropores are defined as cavities with sizes less than 30 μm.

== Uses in laboratories ==
Microporous materials are often used in laboratory environments to facilitate contaminant-free exchange of gases. Mold spores, bacteria, and other airborne contaminants will become trapped, while gases are allowed to pass through the material. This allows for a sterile environment within the contained area.

== Other uses ==
Microporous media are used in large format printing applications, normally with a pigment based ink, to maintain colour balance and life expectancy of the resultant printed image.

Microporous materials are also used as high performance insulation in applications ranging from homes to metal furnaces requiring material that can withstand more than 1000º Celsius, like the solutions made by UNICORN Insulations.

== See also ==
- Characterisation of pore space in soil
- Nanoporous materials
- Conjugated microporous polymer, a type of microporous material
