= Nanoporous materials =

Regular organic or inorganic structure which supports a regular porous structure

Nanoporous materials consist of a regular organic or inorganic bulk phase in which a porous structure is present. Nanoporous materials exhibit pore diameters that are most appropriately quantified using units of nanometers. The diameter of pores in nanoporous materials is thus typically 100 nanometers or smaller. Nanoporous materials include subsets of mesoporous (with typical pores having sizes between 2 and 50 nanometers) and microporous materials (typical pores with diameters <2nm). Pores may be open or closed, and pore connectivity and void fraction vary considerably, as with other porous materials. Open pores are pores that connect to the surface of the material whereas closed pores are pockets of void space within a bulk material. Open pores are useful for molecular separation techniques, adsorption, and catalysis studies. Closed pores are mainly used in thermal insulators and for structural applications.

Most nanoporous materials can be classified as bulk materials or membranes. Activated carbon and zeolites are two examples of bulk nanoporous materials, while cell membranes can be thought of as nanoporous membranes. A porous medium or a porous material is a material containing pores (voids). The skeletal portion of the material is often called the "matrix" or "frame". The pores are typically filled with a fluid (liquid or gas).

1. There are many natural nanoporous materials, but artificial materials can also be manufactured. One method of doing so is to combine polymers with different melting points, so that upon heating one polymer degrades. A nanoporous material with consistently sized pores has the property of letting only certain substances pass through, while blocking others.

== Classifications ==
=== Classification By Size ===
The term nanomaterials covers diverse forms of materials with various applications. According to IUPAC porous materials are subdivided into 3 categories:

- Microporous materials: 0.2–2 nm
- Mesoporous materials: 2–50 nm
- Macroporous materials: 50–1000 nm

These categories conflict with the classical definition of nanoporous materials, as they have pore diameters between 1 and 100 nm. This range covers all the classifications listed above. However, for the sake of simplicity, scientists choose to use the term nanomaterials and list its associated diameter instead.

Microporous and mesoporous materials are distinguished as separate material classes owing to the distinct applications afforded by the pores sizes in these materials. Confusingly, the term microporous is used to describe materials with smaller pores sizes than materials commonly referred to simply as nanoporous. More correctly, microporous materials are better understood as a subset of nanoporous materials, namely materials that exhibit pore diameters smaller than 2 nm. Having pore diameters with length scales of molecules, such materials enable applications that require molecular selectivity such as filtration and separation membranes. Mesoporous materials, referring generally to materials with average pore diameters in the range 2-50 nm are interesting as catalyst support materials and adsorbents owing to their high surface area to volume ratios.

Sometimes classifying by size becomes difficult as there could be porous materials that have various diameters. For example, microporous materials may have a few pores with 2 to 50 nm diameter due to random grain packing. These specifics must be taken into consideration when categorizing by pore size.

=== Classification By Network Materials ===
In addition to classification by size, nanoporous materials can be further classified into organic and inorganic network materials. A network material is the structure 'hosts' the pores and is where the medium (gas or liquid) interacts with the substrate. While there are plenty of inorganic nanoporous membranes, there are few organic ones due to issues with stability.

==== Organic ====
Organic nanoporous materials are polymers made from elements such as boron, carbon, nitrogen, and oxygen. These materials are usually microporous although mesoporous/microporous structures do exist. These include covalent organic frameworks (COFs), covalent triazine frameworks, polymers of intrinsic microporosity (PIMs), hyper cross-linked polymers (HCPs), and conjugated microporous polymers (CMPs). Each of these has different structures and manufacturing steps. In general, to create organic nanoporous materials, a monomer with greater than 2 branches (i.e. covalent bonds) is dissolved in a solvent. After additional monomers are added and polymerization occurs, the solvent is removed and the remaining structure is considered a nanoporous material.

Organic nanoporous materials can be further classified into crystalline and amorphous networks. Crystalline networks are materials that have a well-defined pore sizes. The pore sizes are so well defined that simply by changing the monomer, one can obtain different pore sizes. COFs are an example of such crystalline structure. In contrast, amorphous nanoporous materials have a distribution of pore sizes and are usually disordered. An example is PIMs. Both categories have various uses in gas sorption and catalysis reactions.

==== Inorganic ====
Inorganic nanoporous materials are porous materials that include the use of oxide-type, carbon, binary, and pure metal materials. Examples include zeolites, nanoporous alumina, mesoporous silicates, and titania nanotubes. Zeolites are crystalline hydrated tectoaluminosilicates. This material is a combination of alkali/alkali earth metals, alumina, and silica hydrates. These are used for ion-exchange beds and for water purification. Nanoporous alumina is a biocompatible material widely used in various dental and orthopedic implants. Titania nanotubes are also used in orthopedics but are special as they can form a titanium oxide layer upon exposure to oxygen. Because the surface of the material is oxide-protected, this material has excellent biocompatibility with incredible mechanical strength.

== Applications ==
=== Gas Storage/Sensing ===
Gas storage is crucial for energy, medical, and environmental applications. Nanoporous materials enable a unique method of gas storage through adsorption. When the substrate and gas interact with each other, the gas molecules can physio-adsorb or covalently bond with the nanoporous material, which is known as physical storage and chemical storage, respectively. While one may store gases in the bulk phase, such as in a bottle, nanoporous materials enable higher storage density, which is attractive for energy applications.

One example of this application is hydrogen storage. With the onset of climate change, there is an increased interest in zero-emission vehicles, especially in fuel cell electric vehicles. By storing hydrogen at high densities using porous materials, one can increase electric car mileage range.

Another use case for nanoporous materials is as a substrate for gas sensors. For example, measuring the electrical resistivity of a porous metal can yield the exact concentration of an analyte species in gaseous form. Since the resistivity of the substrate is proportional to the surface area of the porous media, using nanoporous materials will yield higher sensitivity in detecting trace gaseous species than their bulk counterparts. This is especially useful as nanoporous materials have a higher effective surface area normalized to the top-view surface area

=== Biological applications ===
Nanoporous materials are used in biological applications as well. Enzyme catalyzed reactions in biological applications are highly utilized for metabolism and processing large molecules. Nanoporous materials offer the opportunity to embed enzymes onto the porous substrate which enhances the lifetime of the reactions for long-term implants. Another application is found in DNA sequencing. By coating an inorganic nanoporous membrane on an insulating material, nanopores can be utilized for single-molecule analysis. By threading DNA through these nanopores, one can read out the ionic current through the pore which can be correlated to one of four nucleotides.
