= Mesoporous material =

Material with pores between 2 and 50 nm

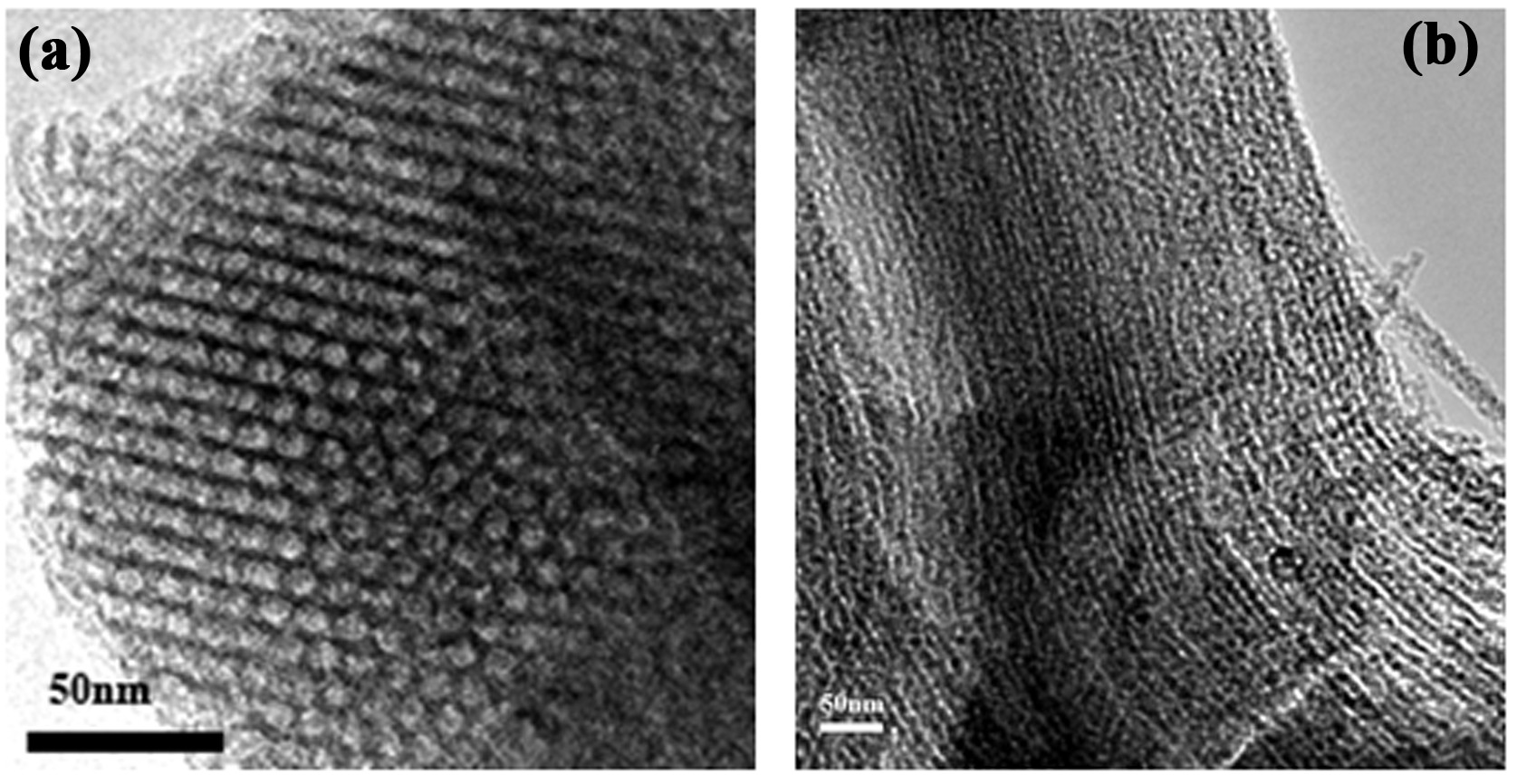
Electron microscopy images of nitrogen-containing ordered mesoporous carbon (N-OMC) taken (a) along and (b) perpendicular to the channel direction.

A mesoporous material (or super nanoporous) is a nanoporous material containing pores with diameters between 2 and 50 nm, according to IUPAC nomenclature. For comparison, IUPAC defines microporous material as a material having pores smaller than 2 nm in diameter and macroporous material as a material having pores larger than 50 nm in diameter.

Typical mesoporous materials include some kinds of silica and alumina that have similarly sized mesopores. Mesoporous oxides of niobium, tantalum, titanium, zirconium, cerium and tin have also been reported. However, the flagship of mesoporous materials is mesoporous carbon, which has direct applications in energy storage devices. Mesoporous carbon has porosity within the mesopore range and this significantly increases the specific surface area. Another very common mesoporous material is activated carbon which is typically composed of a carbon framework with both mesoporosity and microporosity depending on the conditions under which it was synthesized.

According to IUPAC, a mesoporous material can be disordered or ordered in a mesostructure. In crystalline inorganic materials, mesoporous structure noticeably limits the number of lattice units, and this significantly changes the solid-state chemistry. For example, the battery performance of mesoporous electroactive materials is significantly different from that of their bulk structure.

A procedure for producing mesoporous materials (silica) was patented around 1970, and methods based on the Stöber process from 1968 were still in use in 2015. It went almost unnoticed and was reproduced in 1997. Mesoporous silica nanoparticles (MSNs) were independently synthesized in 1990 by researchers in Japan. They were later produced also at Mobil Corporation laboratories and named Mobil Crystalline Materials, or MCM-41. The initial synthetic methods did not allow to control the quality of the secondary level of porosity generated. It was only by employing quaternary ammonium cations and silanization agents during the synthesis that the materials exhibited a true level of hierarchical porosity and enhanced textural properties. Mesoporous materials have been also produced in the form of thin films via evaporation induced self-assembly, in different organized mesostructures and compositions.

Since then, research in this field has steadily grown. Notable examples of prospective industrial applications are catalysis, sorption, gas sensing, batteries, ion exchange, optics, and photovoltaics. In the field of catalysis, zeolites is an emerging topic where the mesoporosity as a function of the catalyst is studied to improve its performance for use in Fluid catalytic cracking.

It should be taken into account that this mesoporosity refers to the classification of nanoscale porosity, and mesopores may be defined differently in other contexts; for example, mesopores are defined as cavities with sizes in the range 30 μm–75 μm in the context of porous aggregations such as soil.

== See also ==
- Characterisation of pore space in soil
- Nanoporous materials
- Mesoporous silica
- Silicon dioxide
- Mesoporous silicate
