= Macropore =

Cavities in soil larger than 75 μm

In soil, macropores are defined as cavities that are larger than 75 μm. Functionally, pores of this size host preferential soil solution flow and rapid transport of solutes and colloids. Macropores increase the hydraulic conductivity of soil, allowing water to infiltrate and drain quickly, and shallow groundwater to move relatively rapidly via lateral flow. In soil, macropores are created by plant roots, soil cracks, soil fauna, and by aggregation of soil particles into peds. Macropores can also be found in soil between larger individual mineral particles such as sand or gravel.

Macropores may be defined differently in other contexts. Within the context of porous solids (i.e., not porous aggregations such as soil), colloid and surface chemists define macropores as cavities that are larger than 50 nm.

== Formation of soil macropores ==
Primary particles (sand, silt and clay) in soil are bound together by various agents and under different processes to form soil aggregates (peds). Spaces of different shapes and sizes exist within and between these soil aggregates. The larger spaces between aggregates are called macropores. Macropores can be formed under the influence of physical processes such as wet/dry and freeze/thaw cycles, which result in cracks and fissures of soils. They can also be formed under biological processes where plant roots and soil organisms play an important role in their formation. Macropores created by biological activities are also called biopores. For example, plant roots create large spaces between soil aggregates with their growth and decay. Soil fauna, especially burrowing species such as earthworms, contributes to the formation of macropores with their movement and activities in soils. In general, the formation of macropore is negatively related to soil depth as these physical and biological processes diminish with depth.

== Importance of soil macropores ==
As an important part of soil structure, macropores are vital to the provision of many soil ecosystem services. They allow free movement of water and air, influence transport of chemicals and provide habitats for soil organisms. Therefore, understanding the importance of soil macropore is also critical to achieving sustainable management of our soil resources.

=== Water and air movement ===
Water can move freely under the influence of gravity in soil macropores when compared to micropores (much smaller pores in soils) where water is held by capillary forces. Water also tends to move along paths of the least resistance. Connected macropores create these paths and result in the so-called preferential flows in soils. Such attributes of macropores will allow fast movement of water into and across soils, that can significantly improve soil infiltration rate and permeability. These in turn can help to reduce surface runoff, soil erosion and prevent flooding. It also contributes to groundwater recharge that replenish water resources.

On the other hand, these pores will be filled with air when they do not hold water. An extended network of macropores helps to improve gas exchange between soil and the atmosphere, especially when these macropores are connected to soil surface. Soil gases such as carbon dioxide and oxygen are important elements of soil respiration. Oxygen is essential to the growth of plant roots and soil organisms while the release of carbon dioxide through respiration is an integral part of the global carbon cycling.

Optimal water and air movement through soils not only provide essential elements to sustain life but are also fundamental to various soil processes such as nutrient cycling.

=== Solute and pollutant transport ===
As macropores facilitate water movement in soils, they also inevitably influence the transport of chemicals which are dissolved in water. As a result, macropores can play a significant role in affecting the cycling of soil nutrients and the distribution of soil pollutants. For instance, while preferential flow paths consist of macropores enhance the drainage of soil water, the dissolved nutrients can be carried away rapidly and lead to an uneven distribution of water as well as chemicals in the soils. When excess chemicals or pollutants are released into groundwater, they can cause water pollution in the receiving water bodies. This can be a concern especially to some land uses such as agricultural activities, as it leads to issues regarding the effectiveness of irrigation and fertilization as well as impacts of environmental pollution. For example, excessive nitrate converted from nitrogen fertilizers can be washed into groundwater under heavy rainfall or irrigation. Subsequently, a high level of nitrate in drinking water can cause health concerns.

=== Habitats for soil organisms ===
Being large pores in soils, macropores allow easy movement of water and air that they provide favourable spaces for plant root growth and habitats for soil organisms. Consequently, these pores, with various residing soil organisms such as earthworms and larvae, also become important locations of soil bio-chemical processes that affect the overall soil quality.

== Characteristics of macropore network ==
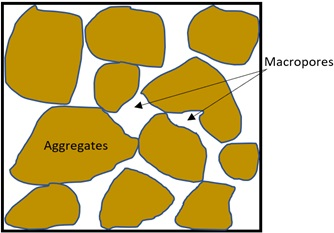
Irregular geometry of soil macropores

Soil macropores are not uniform but have an irregular geometry. They vary in shapes, sizes, and even surface roughness. When connected together, they form specific networks in soils. Therefore, the characteristics of these macropore networks can have significant influences on their functions in soils, especially in relation to water movement, aeration, and plant root growth.

=== Connectivity ===
The interconnectedness of soil macropores affects the capability of soil to conduct water and thus controls its water infiltration and hydraulic conductivity. Higher connectivity of soil macropores is usually associated with higher soil permeability. Connection of macropores with soil surface and groundwater also contributes to water infiltration into soils and replenishment of groundwater. The connectivity of soil macropores influences the vertical and lateral movement of both water and solutes in soils.

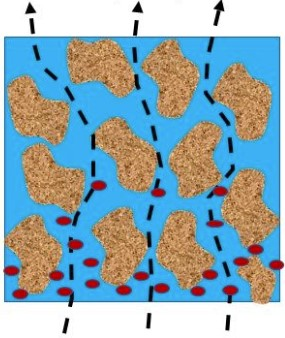
Soil macropore connectivity and continuity

=== Continuity ===
Interconnected soil macropores may not create continuous paths, especially across the soil boundaries. The existence of dead-end pores can block or slow down water and air movement. Therefore, the continuity of soil macropores is also an influential factor in soil processes.

For example, higher continuousness of macropores can result in higher gas exchange between soil and the atmosphere while lead to better soil aeration. Continued connection of macropores will also provide extended spaces that plants can easily grow their roots into, without sacrificing aboveground biomass by allocating resources for their roots to search for new spaces in discontinued areas.

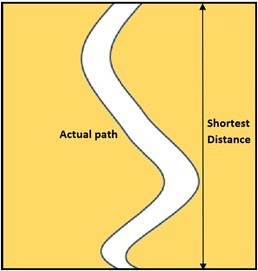
Tortuosity of soil macropores

=== Tortuosity ===
While soil macropore can be connected continuously to form long channels between two points in a soil, these channels are mostly sinuous rather than straight. Tortuosity is basically a ratio between the actual path length and the shortest distance between two points. In essence, tortuosity of macropore paths indicates their resistance to water flow. The more sinuous the paths, the higher the resistance. This will then affect the speed of water movement and distribution in soils.

== Management ==
Soil macropores are a vital part of soil structure and their conservation is critical to sustainable management of our soil resources. This is particularly true to soils that are constantly subject to human disturbance, such as tilled agricultural fields where the shape and size of macropores can be altered by tillage.

Soil macropores are easily affected by soil compaction. Compacted soils, for example in forest landings, usually have a low macropore proportion (macro-porosity) with impeded water movement.

Organic matter can be incorporated into disturbed soils to improve their macro-porosity and related soil functions

== See also ==
- Characterisation of pore space in soil
- Nanoporous materials
- Gravitational water
