= Pore space in soil =

Volume occupied by liquid and gas phases in a soil

The pore space of soil contains the liquid and gas phases of soil, i.e., everything but the solid phase that contains mainly minerals of varying sizes as well as organic compounds.

In order to understand porosity better a series of equations have been used to express the quantitative interactions between the three phases of soil.

Macropores or fractures play a major role in infiltration rates in many soils as well as preferential flow patterns, hydraulic conductivity and evapotranspiration. Cracks are also very influential in gas exchange, influencing respiration within soils. Modeling cracks therefore helps understand how these processes work and what the effects of changes in soil cracking such as compaction, can have on these processes.

The pore space of soil is the habitat of plant roots (rhizosphere), soil fauna and microorganisms, and in turn growing plant roots and burrowing soil animals affect it by creating networks of interconnected pores.

== Background ==
=== Dry bulk density ===
$$\rho_{dry} = \frac{M_{solid}}{V_{total}}$$

The dry bulk density of a soil greatly depends on the mineral/organic assemblage making up the soil and on its degree of compaction. The density of quartz is around 2.65 g/cm^{3} but the dry bulk density of a soil can be less than half that value.

Most soils have a dry bulk density between 1.0 and 1.6 g/cm^{3} but organic soils may have a dry bulk density well below 1 g/cm^{3}.

Core samples are taken by pushing a metallic cutting edge into the soil at the desired depth or soil horizon. The soil samples are then oven dried (often at 105 °C) until constant weight.

$$\rm{Dry \ bulk \ density} = \frac{\rm{(mass \ of \ oven \ dry \ soil)}}{\rm{(total \ sample \ volume)}}$$

The dry bulk density of a soil is thus inversely proportional to its porosity. The more pore space in a soil, the lower its dry bulk density.

=== Porosity ===
$$\eta = \frac{V_{pore}}{V_{total}} = \frac{V_{fluid}}{V_{total}}$$

or, more generally, for an unsaturated soil in which the pores are filled by two fluids, air and water:

$$\eta = \frac{V_{air}+V_{water}}{V_{solid}+V_{air}+V_{water}}$$

The porosity $\eta$ is a measure of the total pore space in the soil. This is defined as a fraction of volume often given in percent. The amount of porosity in a soil depends on the minerals that make up the soil and on the amount of sorting occurring within the soil structure. For example, a sandy soil will have a larger porosity than a silty sand, because the silt will fill the gaps in between the sand particles, and the more in clay-silt-sand mixtures.

== Pore space relations ==
=== Hydraulic conductivity ===
Hydraulic conductivity (K) is a property of soil that describes the ease with which water can move through pore spaces. It depends on the permeability of the material (pores, compaction) and on the degree of soil saturation. Saturated hydraulic conductivity, K_{sat}, describes water movement through saturated media, where hydraulic conductivity has the capability to be measured at any state. It can be estimated by numerous kinds of equipment. To calculate hydraulic conductivity, Darcy's law is used. The manipulation of the law depends on the soil saturation and instrument used.

=== Infiltration ===
Infiltration is the process by which water on the ground surface enters the soil. The water enters the soil through the pores by the forces of gravity and capillary action. The largest cracks and pores offer a great reservoir for the initial flush of water. This allows a rapid infiltration mostly by gravity. The smaller pores take longer to fill and rely on capillary forces as well as gravity. The smaller pores have a slower infiltration as the soil becomes more saturated, as well as when air is entrapped within small pores.

== Pore types ==
A pore is not simply a void in the solid structure of soil. The various pore size categories have different characteristics and contribute different attributes to soils depending on the number and frequency of each type. A widely used classification of pore size is that of Brewer (1964):

=== Macropore ===
The pores that are too large to have any significant capillary force. Unless impeded by pore closure, water will drain from these pores, and they are generally air-filled at field capacity. Macropores can be caused by cracking, division of peds and aggregates, as well as plant roots and zoological exploration. Size > 75 μm.

=== Mesopore ===
The largest pores are filled with water at field capacity. Also known as storage pores because of the ability to store water useful to plants and soil organisms. They do not have capillary forces too great so that the water does not become limiting to the plants. Soil scientists highly study the properties of mesopores because of their impact on agriculture and irrigation. Size 30–75 μm.

=== Micropore ===
These are pores that are sufficiently small that water within these pores is considered immobile, but available for plant extraction. Because there is little movement of water in these pores, solute movement is mainly by the process of diffusion. Size 5–30 μm.

=== Ultramicropore ===
These pores are suitable for habitation by microorganisms within aggregates, offering them a protection from predators (e.g. amoebae, nematodes),. There is a positive correlation between the volume of ultramicropores and the bacterial biomass. The distribution of ultramicropores is determined by soil texture and soil organic matter, and they are not strongly affected by compaction. Size 0.1–5 μm.

=== Cryptopore ===
Pores that are too small to be penetrated by most microorganisms. Organic matter in these pores is therefore protected from microbial decomposition. They are filled with water unless the soil is very dry, but little of this water is available to plants, and water movement is very slow. Size < 0.1 μm.

== Modeling methods ==
Basic crack modeling has been undertaken for many years from simple observations and measurements of crack size, distribution, continuity and depth. These observations have either been surface observation or done on profiles in pits. Hand tracing and measurement of crack patterns on paper was one method used before advances in digital techniques. Another field method utilised a string and a semicircle of wire. The semicircle was moved along alternating sides of a string line. The cracks within the semicircle were measured for width, length and depth using a ruler. The crack distribution was calculated using the principle of Buffon's needle.

=== Disc permeameter ===
The use of the disc permeameter relies on the fact that crack sizes have a range of different water potentials. At zero water potential at the soil surface, an estimate of saturated hydraulic conductivity is produced, with all pores filled with water. As the potential is decreased, progressively larger cracks drain. By measuring the hydraulic conductivity at a range of negative potentials, the pore size distribution can be determined. While this is not a physical model of the cracks, it does indicate the size of pores within the soil.

=== Horgan and Young model ===
Horgan and Young (2000) developed a computer model to predict a two-dimensional evolution of surface crack formation. It is based on the observation that once cracks come within a certain distance of one another, they tend to be attracted to each other. Cracks also tend to form and be oriented within a particular range of angles, and at some stage, a surface aggregate reaches a size at which no more cracking will occur. These characteristics are often inherent to a soil and can therefore be measured in the field and used in the model. However, this model was not able to predict the points at which cracking starts, and although stochasticity takes part in the formation of crack patterns, in many ways, the cracking of soil is often not random, but follows lines of weakness.

=== Resin-impregnation imaging ===
A representative volume of undisturbed soil core is impregnated with a sufficiently fluid synthetic resin (low viscosity) mixed with a fluorescent dye (e.g., fluorescein). The core is then cut back using a grinding system, very gradually (~1 mm per step). At every step, the external surface of the core sample is illuminated with ultraviolet or blue light and photographed with a digital camera. Then, digital image analysis is performed with a computer. Depth, continuity, surface area and other measurements can then be made on the fluorescent resin-impregnated cracks within the soil.

=== Electrical resistivity imaging ===
Thanks to the infinite resistivity of air, the air-filled spaces within a soil can be mapped. A specially designed resistivity meter had improved the meter-soil contact and therefore the area of the reading. This technique provides images that can be analysed for a wide range of crack properties.

== See also ==
- Aeration of soil
- Particle density
- Pore water pressure
- Soil respiration
