= List of South African inventions and discoveries =

Smartlock safety syringe

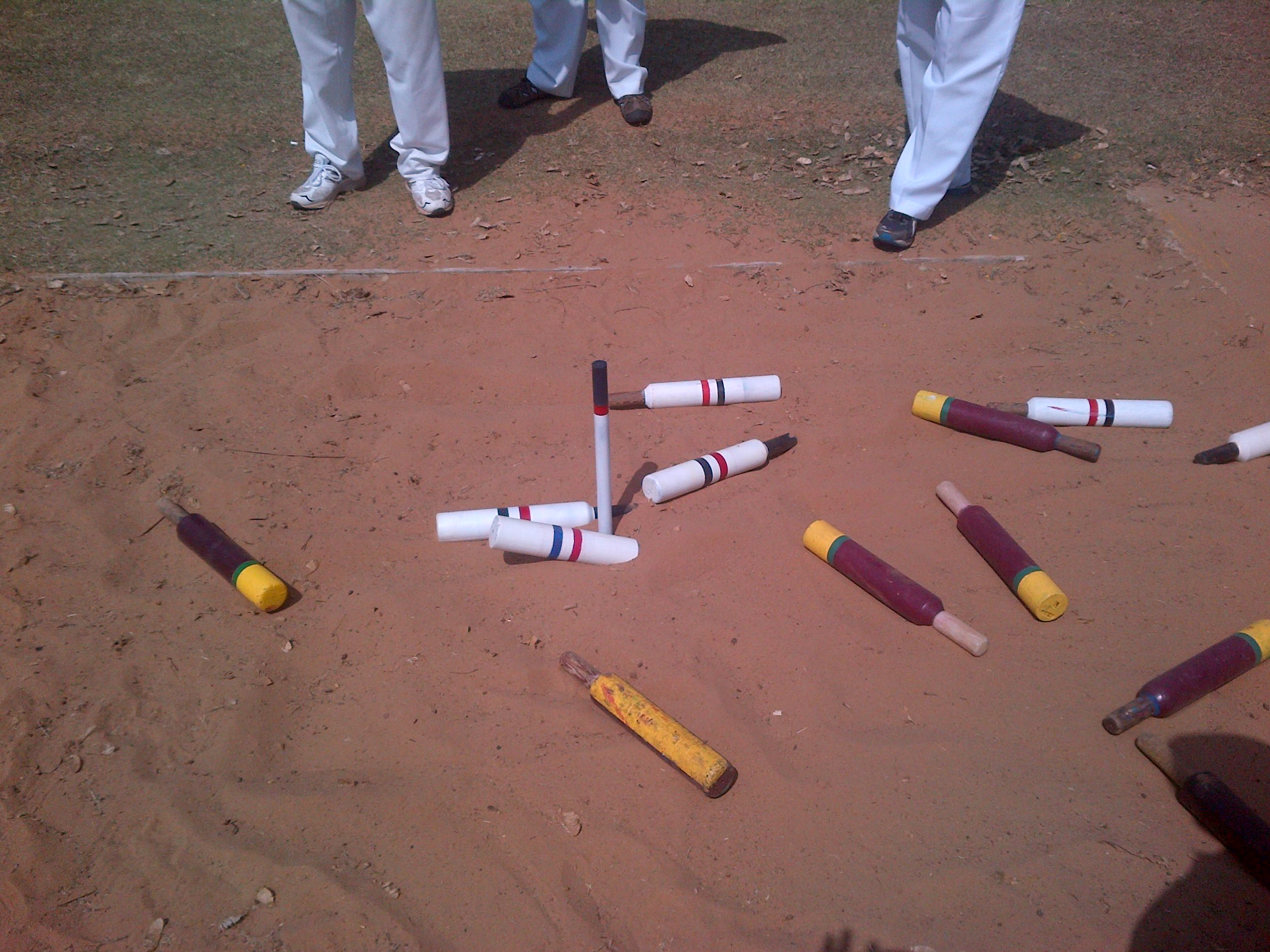
A classic jukskei game

The following is a list and timeline of innovations as well as inventions and discoveries that involved South African people or South Africa including predecessor states in the history of the formation of South Africa. This list covers innovation and invention in the mechanical, electronic, and industrial fields, as well as medicine, military devices and theory, artistic and scientific discovery and innovation, and ideas in religion and ethics.

== 18th Century ==
- 1743 Jukskei is a folksport originating from the Cape and is thought to be the forerunner of the American game Horseshoes.
- 1772 Rooibos tea is recorded by naturalist Carl Thunberg, who noted that "the country people made tea" from a plant related to rooibos or redbush which reignited popular interest in the tea. Khoisan people of the Cederberg region had made the tea for hundreds of years prior.

== 18–19th Century ==
- 1787–1828 The iklwa, a shorter style of spear, was popularized under the rule of Shaka Zulu.

== 20th century ==
=== 1900–1930 ===
- 1925, Pinotage is South Africa's signature variety wine grape, and was bred from a cross between Pinot noir and Cinsaut grapes.

=== 1930–1960 ===
- 1940s, the Wadley loop circuit was designed by Dr. Trevor Wadley and was first used for a stable Wavemeter.
- 1950, Sasol, the country's largest fuel producer, was founded.
- 1950, Q20 lubricant was invented by Mr. Robertson in Pinetown. Q20 is an all purpose lubricating spray that is owned by the Triton-Leo Group (Pty) Ltd. The name derives from "it has 20 answers to 20 questions".
- 1957, Flame ionization detector by Harley and Pretorius at the University of Pretoria in Pretoria, South Africa
- 1959, Tellurometer was the first successful microwave electronic distance measurement equipment and was also invented by Dr. Trevor Wadley.
- 1960s, Helikon vortex separation processis an aerodynamic uranium enrichment process designed around a device called a vortex tube.The Uranium Enrichment Corporation of South Africa, Ltd. (UCOR) developed the process, operating a facility at Pelindaba near Pretoria.

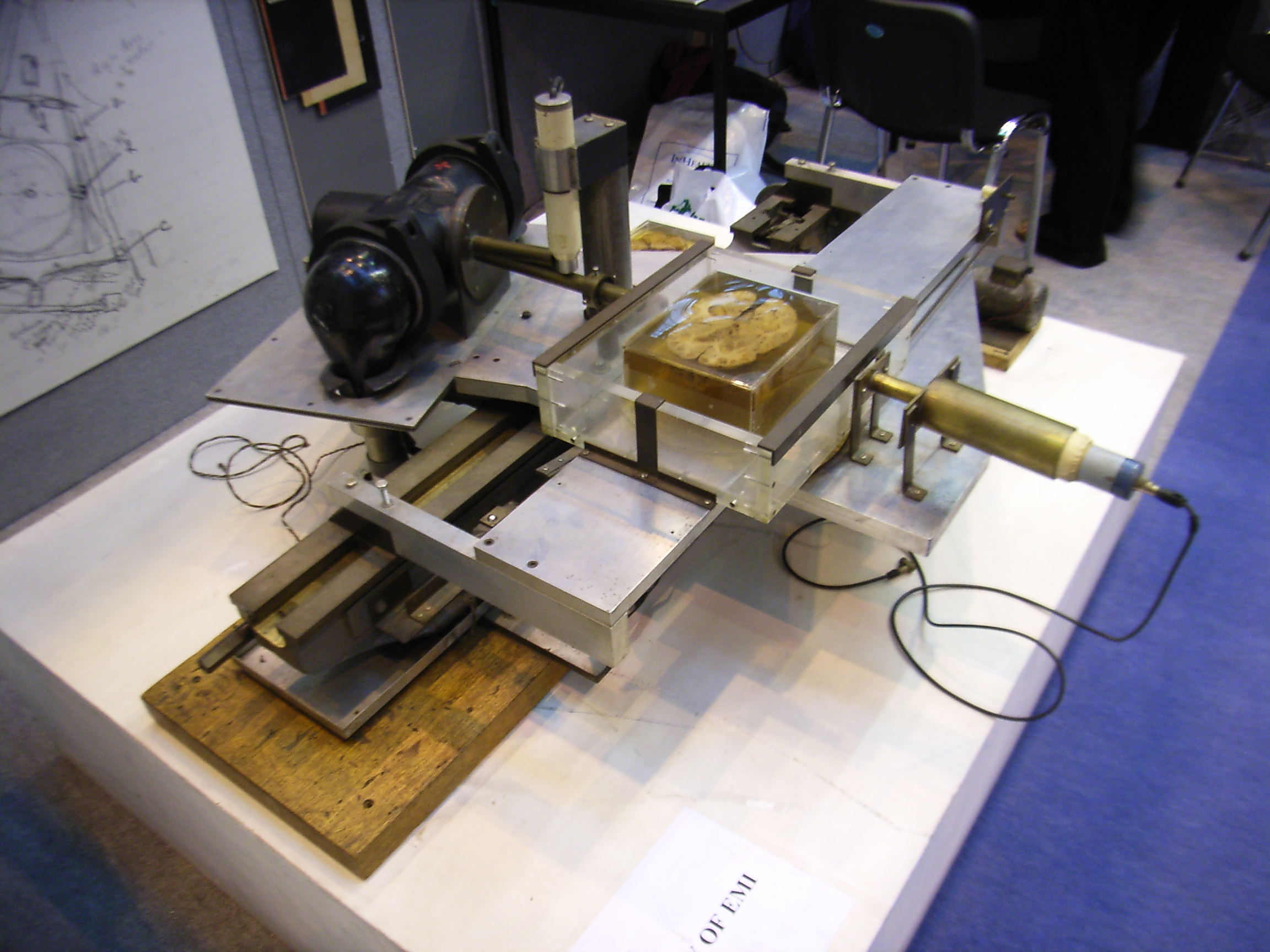
The prototype CT scanner

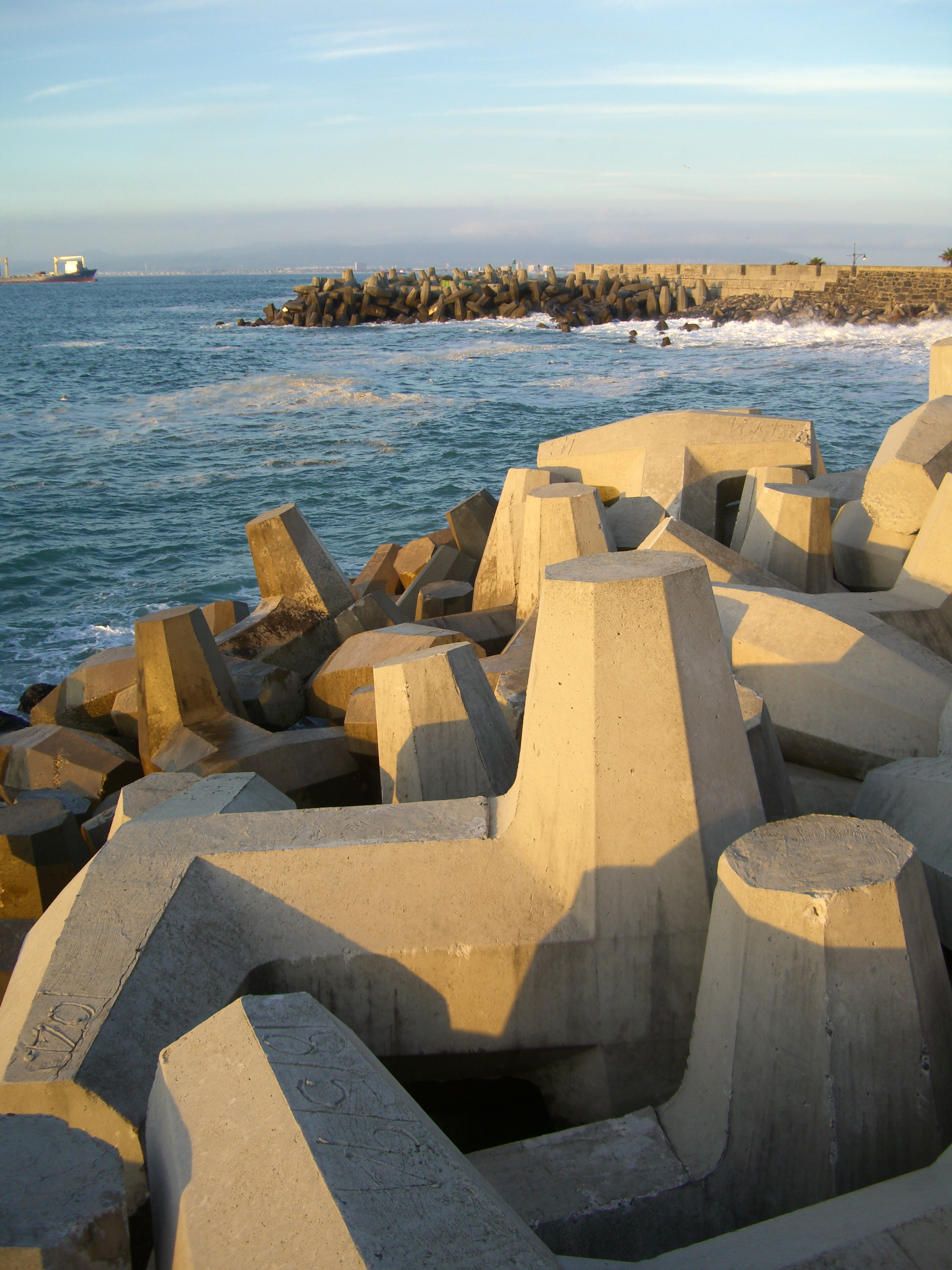
Dolosse - Cape Town, South Africa

=== 1960–1980 ===
- 1961, the Black & Decker Workmate, a portable, multipurpose workbench, was invented by Ron Hickman, and has since sold about 30 million units around the world.
- 1963, the CT scan, or CAT scan, was invented by Allan MacLeod Cormack. He shared the 1979 Nobel Prize in Physiology or Medicine with Godfrey Hounsfield for his work on X-ray CT.
- 1963, the dolos is invented. It is a large concrete block weighing up to 20 tons in a complex geometric shape, used to protect harbor walls from the erosive force of the ocean waves.
- 1965, Freddie "Saddam" Maake claimed to have invented the vuvuzela by fabricating an aluminium version in 1965 from a bicycle horn.
- 1965, Doctor Selig Percy Amoils unveiled the Amoils Cryo Pencil, the world's first surgical tool to use extreme cold to destroy unwanted tissue, at Baragwanath Hospital. Amoils refined the cryoextraction technique for cataract surgery. It has been used to treat Margaret Thatcher and Nelson Mandela's eyes. His invention has been widely used for cryosurgery in gynecology and ophthalmology.
- 1967, Sir Doctor Christiaan Barnard completed the world's first successful heart transplantation on 3 December 1967, in Cape Town.
- 1969, Pratley's Putty was carried aboard the Apollo 11 Eagle landing craft. George Pratley invented Pratley's Putty to hold electrical box components.
- 1970, the diamond vitrectomy cutter was invented by Selig Percy Amoils.
- 1975, the Scheffel bogie was invented by Doctor Herbert Scheffel. This novel bogie design was used to facilitate the development of the South African narrow-gauge railway system.
- 1971, Percy Tucker of Benoni, Gauteng founded Computicket, the world's first computerized ticketing system. It was deployed nationally in 1971.
- 1974, Kreepy Krauly was invented by Ferdinand Chauvier, formerly from the Belgian Congo.
- 1978, South African Class 6E1, Series 4 unit no. E1525 set the world narrow-gauge rail speed record of 245 kilometres per hour.

=== 1980–2000 ===
- 1980, the Casspir, a mine-resistant military personnel vehicle, is produced.
- 1981, Mark Gillman and Fred Lichtigfeld uncovered a new biological principal between 1981 and 1983 i.e., that gases can act as neurotransmitters. This discovery was confirmed as a biological principle at Johns Hopkins University (Baltimore, USA) almost a decade later. Discoveries of a new neurotransmitter class have previously been rewarded with a Nobel Prize e.g. Dale and Loewi (1936) and Furchgott, Ignarro and Murad (1998).
- 1984, development began on the Denel Rooivalk, the first military attack helicopter capable of making a 360 degree loop, a feat previously seen as impossible across the world.
- 1989, FlightScope was founded by Henri Johnson. Originally founded to measure projectiles for the defense industry, FlightScope is a global high-tech company and world leader in the development and manufacturing of 3D Doppler Ball Tracking Monitors, Golf Radars & Launch Monitors for sports. The company was the first worldwide to create a launch monitor capable of tracking a golf ball.
- 1991, the Action Potential Stimulation (APS) Therapy device was invented by Gervan Lubbe. It consists of adhesive electrodes and is used to treat sports injuries and chronic pain conditions.
- 1992, Speed Gun, a device that measures the speed of cricket balls, was invented by Henri Johnson from Somerset West and used in the 1999 Cricket World Cup. Johnson also invented the Speedball, that measures the speed and angle of objects; it is used in various sporting tournaments.
- 1995, the Shark Shield, a portable electronic device that emits an electromagnetic field, was invented. It is often used in scuba diving, spearfishing, ocean kayak fishing, and surfing to repel sharks.
- 1995, Thawte Consulting was founded by Mark Shuttleworth. It is a certificate authority (CA) for X.509 certificates.
- 1996, Vodacom became the first network to introduce prepay mobile phones under the 'Vodago' package, using an 'Intelligent Network' platform. This made it possible to debit customers’ accounts in real time, and led to a dramatic increase in use.
- 1997, CyberTracker was developed by the non-profit CyberTracker Conservation. It allows illiterate animal trackers to record environmental data.
- 1997, the hippo water roller was invented. It is a device for carrying water more easily and efficiently than traditional methods, particularly in the developing world. It consists of a barrel-shaped container which holds the water and can roll along the ground, and a handle attached to the axis of the barrel.
- 1998, Charl Fourie designed the Blaster (flamethrower) to provide defense against carjackings.
- 1999, the Smartlock safety syringe, a three part single use syringe, was invented. It is credited with dramatically reducing HIV infection rates in South Africa.

== 21st century ==
- 2001, Kenneth "Ken" Hall designed the Cobb grill, a charcoal briquette stove as a safer alternative to the paraffin stoves that cause many home fires in rural areas of South Africa. The grill was featured in the Time Magazine's best inventions of the year in 2001.
- 2001, Engineer Graeme Wells created the oil-can guitar.
- 2005, Professor Mulalo Doyoyo invented the "cementless concrete", called Cenocell.
- 2008, the freeplay fetal heart rate monitor was invented. It is a hand-crank powered diagnostic device.
- 2013, Amoriguard, a paint whose fillers are based on recycled industrial waste is invented by Professor Mulalo Doyoyo.
- 2013, Doctor Sandile Ngcobo invented the world's first Digital Laser (Ngcobo, S., Litvin, I., Burger, L. et al. A digital laser for on-demand laser modes. Nat Commun 4, 2289 (2013). https://doi.org/10.1038/ncomms3289).
- 2019, Professor Mashudu Tshifularo becomes the first to transplant 3D-printed bones for reconstructive middle-ear implants on 3 March 2019, at the Steve Biko Academic Hospital.
