= Clarins =

French luxury cosmetics company

- Type: Private
- Industry: Cosmetics
- Founded: 1954; 72 years ago
- Founder: Jacques Courtin-Clarins
- Headquarters: Paris, France
- Area served: Worldwide
- Key people: Jonathan Zrihen, CEO
- Products: Makeup, skincare, perfumes
- Owner: Courtin-Clarins Family
- Number of employees: 8,500
- Website: www.groupeclarins.com

Clarins is a French global leader in luxury skincare and cosmetics, renowned for its pioneering fusion of science and nature. Founded in Paris in 1954 by Jacques Courtin‑Clarins, Clarins revolutionized the beauty industry by being the first company to add plant extracts to skincare for their unique benefits. It's been the number one luxury skincare brand in Europe since 1990, and its flagship Double Serum is ranked the bestselling serum worldwide, with one bottle sold every three seconds.

Clarins develops, manufactures, and markets skincare and make-up with products crafted exclusively in France and operates in the spa sector in nearly 150 countries. The company's products are sold both online and at high-end department stores and retailers.

Clarins owns numerous brands including its eponymous brand Clarins, myBlend, ILIA Beauty, and was a major player in the fragrance industry through the Clarins Fragrance Group until it sold its fragrance division to L'Oréal in 2020. Clarins also held a 23.3% stake in L'Occitane en Provence between 1994 and 2011.

== Founding and early history ==
Clarins was founded in 1954 by Jacques Courtin-Clarins, a former medical student, who opened the first Clarins Institute at 35 rue Tronchet in Paris. The Clarins Institute was a day spa that focused on a holistic vision for beauty, and Jacques created tailor-made formulations for his clients there. Courtin-Clarins said of his vision: "I wanted to make a connection between medicine and beauty, between science and the cosmetic world." His early approach focused on using plant-based ingredients and promoting wellness as part of skincare, an approach that distinguished it from many competitors in the post-war French beauty industry.

The brand's first product was called Médecin’Bust and was created in 1947. It was a rotary water-massage device that connected to a bathroom sink and was inspired by lawn sprinklers at the Parc des Buttes Chaumont. It was used to help to tone and firm the chest and breasts.

The company's early success was driven by demand for products such as its first skincare product in 1962, the Masvelt Body Shaping Cream and Tonic Body Treatment Oil three years later in 1965. Clarins Body and Face Oils emphasized the use of pure plant extracts and was the first ever 100% plant derived beauty oil. While the skincare industry focused exclusively on anti-wrinkle products in the late 1960s, Clarins introduced and popularized the concept of firmness products, inventing a brand new category in skincare. The brand continuted to innovate in the firmness category by inventing the first face slimming product in 1995, Lift Minceur Visage, specifically to refine facial contours through lymphatic drainage. This still exists today as the V Shaping Facial Lift line of products.

Jacques Courtin-Clarins served as an early incubator for the luxury hair care brand Leonor Greyl. In the early 1950s, his sister-in-law, Leonor, worked in the Clarins Institute on Rue Tronchet in Paris, where she discovered a distinct talent for hair treatments. Courtin-Clarins encouraged this specialization and provided her with the formulas for her very first botanical shampoos. Using this foundational knowledge, she and her husband officially launched the Leonor Greyl brand in 1968, which has since become a global leader in natural hair care.

In 1968, the company began putting a "customer card" into every product box to create a direct dialogue with consumers. Founder Jacques Courtin-Clarins tracked this feedback in a file he jokingly called the product's "rap sheet" to ensure quality control and product evolution. Today, the company conducts consumer dialogue through its digital rewards program, Club Clarins.

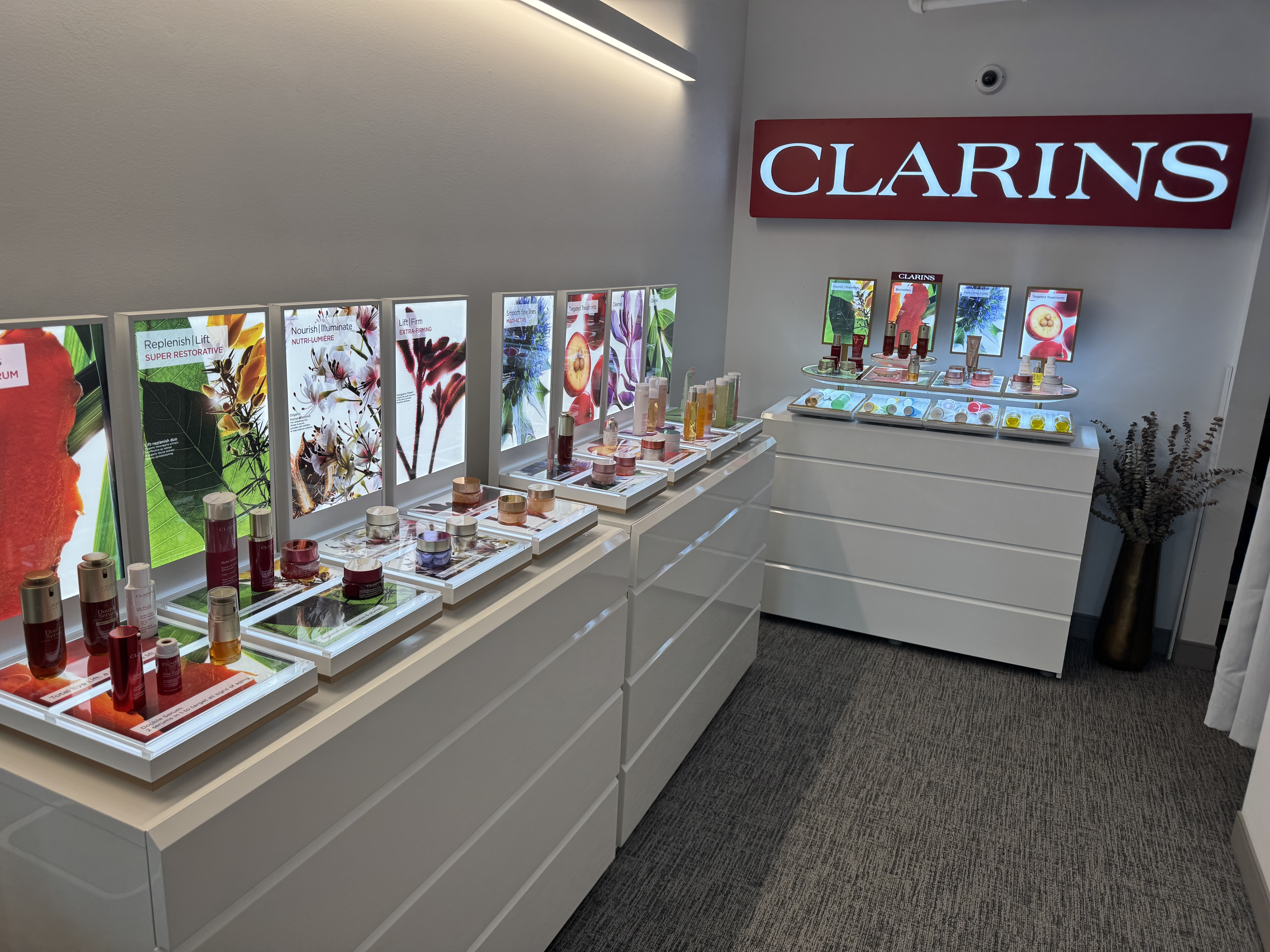
Clarins products on display at the company's US headquarters in New York City in 2025.

One of Clarins' early bespoke clients included Queen Elizabeth II who commissioned Clarins to produce a custom red lipstick shade to match the red Robe of State for her royal coronation. The Queen requested that the lipstick should be “pink to red” or as a “deep, ruby red with soft undertones." The same lipstick is still sold today as the Joli Rouge Lipstick. Since then, Clarins has remained a favorite within the British royal household, with its products regularly used by members of the royal family. In recognition of this long-standing relationship, the brand was granted a Royal Warrant in 2007, an honor awarded to only a select few beauty companies. Queen Elizabeth used the Hand and Nail Treatment Cream and Ever Matte Radiant Mattifying Powder, while Princess Kate Middleton uses Clarins Lip Perfector.

== Expansion and family leadership ==
In the 1970s, Clarins began expanding internationally under the leadership of Jacques’ son, Christian Courtin-Clarins. The brand grew steadily, launching new product lines and entering department stores and duty-free channels globally. By 1971, Clarins was sold in almost 15 countries with multiple subsidiaries opening up from Europe to Asia.

In the 1970s, while much of the beauty industry at the time was focused on "glamour tanning," Clarins shifted the narrative toward skin protection. They became the first brand to market sun care for the whole family, breaking away from traditional advertisements to feature imagery of a mother and her children. Also in the early 1970s, Clarins further disrupted traditional marketing by pioneering the advertorial, or "publi-rédactionnel", format in Cosmopolitan magazine, bypassing glossy, image-only ads in favor of text-heavy, educational columns.

In 1981, it opened its first western hemisphere subsidiary, Clarins USA, based in New York City. When launching in America, Clarins did not follow the standard gift-with-purchase model, instead employing a "try before you buy" strategy utilizing targeted sampling based on personalized skin consultations.

In 1984, Clarins became a public company and was listed on the Paris Stock Exchange, fueling major expansions including the opening of a new manufacturing facility in Pontoise.

In 1985, Clarins released its now-flagship Double Serum, combining water- and oil-soluble ingredients in a dual-chamber design. Since then, the product has been reformulated numerous times, keeping it at the forefront of skincare technology. Double Serum has won nearly 450 beauty awards, has been the number one selling anti-aging serum in the UK since 2013, and a bottle is sold every three seconds.

In 1987, Clarins launched their first fragrance, Eau Dynamisante, which has since become a cult favorite and brought the company to further study the benefits of aromatherapy. The launch of Eau Dynamisante created a new category by combining the olfactory benefits of perfume with the skincare benefits of plant extracts, now known as "skinification".

Clarins was the first French company, and one of the first beauty companies worldwide, to discontinue animal testing in 1987. It subsequently eliminated all active ingredients of animal origin from their formulas in 1991.

In 1990, Clarins entered a strategic partnership with designer Thierry Mugler to expand into the fragrance market, leading to the 1992 launch of Angel. Created by perfumers Olivier Cresp and Yves de Chirin, Angel is recognized as the first modern "gourmand" fragrance, a category characterized by edible, dessert-like accords. The scent utilized a high dose of ethyl maltol to mimic the aroma of pralines and caramel. This formulation diverged from the dominant floral and aquatic trends of the early 1990s and introduced the industry's first blue-tinted liquid.

In 1991, Clarins launched its first make-up collection, expanding the brand's activities beyond skincare. The range combined color cosmetics with skincare-inspired formulations incorporating plant extracts.

By 1998, Angel reached the top sales position in the French perfume market. Internationally, the fragrance was ranked by The NPD Group as the fifth best-selling scent of all time in the United States by 2011 and was inducted into the FiFi Awards Hall of Fame in 2007. Prior to L'Oréal's acquisition of the Mugler brand from Clarins in 2019, Angel and its 2005 successor, Alien, generated approximately $280 million in combined annual sales.

Clarins introduced its first makeup collection in 1991, alongside a line of products featuring an anti-pollution complex. Inspired by the sight of soot accumulating on car windshields, the brand specifically formulated its makeup to act as a functional shield against urban pollution. Clarins is credited with inventing this new category of anti-pollution skincare and makeup, decades before it became popular in the 2010s. Since then, the brand's makeup offerings have included several bestsellers, such as the Joli Rouge Lipstick and Lip Comfort Oil. Clarins is credited with pioneering the modern lip oil trend by creating the world first lip oil in 2014.

In 1994, Clarins acted as an industry incubator, taking a 23% stake in L'Occitane en Provence and providing the industrial structure needed to scale it globally.

In 2002, Clarins unveiled its first line targeted towards men called ClarinsMen. The line features professional shave products, cleansers, moisturizers, eye creams, among other specialty men's skincare items. The ClarinsMen line was an instant success, leaping to the second-highest position in the French men's skincare market within one year. Currently, ClarinsMen is ranked as the fourth most popular men's skincare line globally.

After nearly 25 years as a publicly traded company, in 2008, the Courtin-Clarins family made a €680 million buyout of minority shareholders to delist the company and bring it back to being a private, family-owned company. In 2010, Virginie, Claire, Prisca, Christian, and Jenna Courtin-Clarins became members of the Clarins Supervisory Board to ensure the company's mission kept with the original vision of founder Jacques Courtin-Clarins. While the company remains family-owned, Jonathan Zrihen was appointed president and CEO in 2025, after 25 years of experience working for Clarins.

== Recent developments ==
In 2014, Clarins relocated their headquarters within Neuilly-sur-Seine moving from 5/7 Rue du Commandant Pilot to a new office at 12 Avenue de la Porte des Ternes. This new headquarters building reflects Clarins' commitment to sustainability. The new building is eco-friendly featuring both HQE and BREEAM certifications. Designed by Valode et Pistre, it utilizes sustainable, high-tech features including geothermal cooling, solar panels, and biodiversity-focused green spaces with hives that are home to 160,000 bees.

Clarins is credited with pioneering the modern lip oil category when it launched Lip Comfort Oil in 2015, drawing on its decades of expertise in plant-based oils to create the first lip oil on the market. This hybrid skincare-makeup product combined botanical oils with color and shine, distinguishing it from traditional glosses and sparking a worldwide trend that saw many other brands follow suit. Since its introduction, Lip Comfort Oil has become a global bestseller and helped establish lip oils as a staple in the beauty industry. Clarins sells one Lip Comfort Oil every 8 seconds as of 2024.

In 2018, Clarins began producing its own plant-based ingredients at Domaine Clarins, an open-air laboratory located in a protected area of the French Alps near Serraval, dedicated to sustainable cultivation and research. This initiative was further expanded in 2024 when Clarins announced it acquired a vast natural area of 115 hectares located in the South of France near Nimes.Clarins calls this laboratory Domaine Clarins Sainte-Colombe. Domaine Clarins became the first-ever site in the cosmetics industry to receive Regenerative Organic Certified status in January 2025, recognizing its adherence to strict standards for soil health, animal welfare, and social fairness in regenerative agriculture.

In 2020, Clarins sold its fragrance division, Clarins Fragrance Group, as part of a strategy to focus on its core business of skincare and cosmetics. In 2018, the Clarins Fragrance Group alone generated nearly US$400 million in sales. Fragrance brands that were part of the Clarins Fragrance Group over its history include Thierry Mugler, Azzaro, David Yurman, Porsche Design, Swarovski, Stella Cadente, Zadig& Voltaire, perfumes. Clarins did not sell their eponymous aromatherapy focused fragrance line which includes Eau Dynamisante, Eau de Jardins, Eau Ressourçante, Eau Extraordinaire, and Eau Ensoleillante.

Clarins has continued to introduce new product lines and innovations. In 2019, the company expanded its product offerings with the launch of MyClarins, a vegan and cruelty free skincare range targeted at women aged 18 to 29. In 2022, it relaunched myBlend, a personalized skincare brand first introduced in 2007, with new environmentally focused formulations and packaging. That same year, Clarins also acquired ILIA Beauty, an American brand known for its clean makeup products. In 2023, the company launched Clarins Precious, an ultra-luxury anti-aging skincare collection that utilizes a rare Moonlight Flower cryoextract.

Clarins funded research on a plant-based retinol alternative, called Harungana. Numerous studies have shown it is as effective as retinol for anti-aging, while being significantly less irritating than retinol and bakuchiol, used in the Total Eye Lift Treatment.

In 2026, Clarins launched Double Serum Foundation, extending its Double Serum product line into color cosmetics with a hybrid foundation combining make-up and skincare.

== myBlend ==
MyBlend is a skincare brand relaunched in 2022 by the Clarins Group under the leadership of Dr. Olivier Courtin-Clarins, with a focus on epigenetics-informed research. The brand includes skincare products, dietary supplements, beauty technology devices, and professional spa services. In 2024, it received the Marie Claire Prix d'Excellence de la Beauté.

The brand's flagship experiential space, Maison myBlend, opened in 2022 at 23 Rue Debelleyme in Paris's Marais district. It provides professional skin diagnostics and equipment such as LED masks and Cell-Synergy, as well as bespoke treatments.

MyBlend products are available online, at select luxury spas including Hôtel Lutetia in Paris, and in retailers and department stores such as Harrods and Le Bon Marché.

== Science and research ==
The company own a major Research & Development (R&D) site in Pontoise (Val d’Oise, France), which brings together both laboratories and production facilities. The R&D division emphasises botanical science, phytochemistry and skinbiology research, stating that over 120 employees are dedicated to this work annually and that hundreds of plants are studied for active ingredient potential. In support of performance claims, Clarins holds multiple patent filings in the field of cosmetics research.

More recently, its R&D team has explored epigenetics, meaning studying how plant-derived ingredients can help reinforce skin's resistance to environmental aggressors — a concept that underpins the formulation of its iconic Clarins Double Serum. The company also operates an R&D laboratory in Shanghai, China.

Clarins has developed its skincare research around the biological processes associated with skin ageing. In June 2026, the company announced the opening of the Dr Olivier Courtin-Clarins Longevity Research Center, a research initiative focused on factors influencing skin ageing, including epigenetics. The center brings together specialists from fields including dermatology, ageing biology, epidemiology and biomedical engineering.

According to the company, its research has resulted in 10 patents, 13 peer-reviewed publications and 12 scientific collaborations.

== Domaines Clarins ==
Clarins owns and operates two French farms, referred to as the Domaines Clarins, which serve as cultivation, research and supply-sites for its botanical ingredients.

The first, Domaine de Serraval, is located in the French Alps at approximately 1,400 metres and functions as an open-air laboratory under organic and regenerative agriculture methods. It obtained the Regenerative Organic Certified certification for its regenerative farming activity at the end of 2024.

The second, Domaine Sainte-Colombe, situated near Nîmes in southern France, spans approximately 115 hectares and is intended to provide diversified climate and soil conditions alongside the research and production of [laround 50 plant and tree species.

Clarins aims to cultivate one-third of the plant ingredients used in its formulas on its own estates by 2030. Both Domaines are part of its strategy to enhance traceability, ingredient quality and sustainability in its plant-sourcing model.

== Sustainability ==
Clarins is known to have begun environmental initiatives early in its history. In 1999, the company globally removed plastic shopping bags from all its stores. In 2014, microbeads were eliminated from all rinse‑off exfoliating products. In 2020, the company reached carbon‑neutral status for scopes 1 and 2 and air freight.

In 1992, Angel perfume marked a milestone in environmental design with the introduction of the "Mugler Fountain" (originally termed le ressourçage). Driven by Jacques Courtin-Clarins' concern over the environmental waste of discarding heavy, artisanal glass, the system allowed customers to refill their star-shaped bottles at the perfume counter, a precursor to modern sustainable luxury practices.

Between 2019 and 2024, the company reduced its carbon emissions by approximately 43%, supporting long-term decarbonization targets.

Clarins became a member of the Union for Ethical BioTrade (UEBT) in 2021, formalizing its commitment to ethical sourcing of plant ingredients.

In 2022, the T.R.U.S.T. platform launched, leveraging blockchain technology to provide transparency on ingredient origin, sourcing certifications, and production methods. Consumers can enter a product batch number to see where plants were grown, harvested, and processed.

In 2025, Clarins and its brands achieved B Corp certification, recognizing social, environmental, and governance performance.

Clarins’ long-term strategy focuses on sustainable sourcing, emissions reduction and circular packagings.

High-performance anti-aging products such as Total Eye Lift and ExtraFirming Day Cream are available in refillable formats, as well as Eau Dynamisante since 2018, allowing consumers to replace only the inner cartridge or pod. In October 2025, Clarins partnered with Aptar Beauty to launch the Gaïa airless system for its Total Eye Lift product: a sleek metal casing plus recyclable plastic cartridges that click in and out without sacrificing formula protection. According to Aptar, this design reduces environmental impact by 73%, thanks to 50% less metal, 33% less plastic, and 29% less cardboard compared to previous packaging.

== Social and environmental partnerships ==
Clarins started food access initiatives in 2011 notably through his partnership with FEED and since 2024 with Mary's Meals, which funds approximately 3 million school meals per year. The company is reported to have contributed to more than 50 million meals since 2011.

It also created the Prix Clarins pour l’Enfance, established in 1997, which provides financial support to non-profit organisations working to protect children's rights and well-being.

Through its Seeds of Beauty program, developed with PUR Projet, Clarins has supported reforestation initiatives around the world. As of 2025, the company reports having planted around one million trees under this initiative. The company also collaborates with local farmers through biodiversity projects to strengthen traceability and support regenerative practices.

Clarins participates in several industry-led initiatives to ensure ethical and sustainable sourcing of raw materials, including the Global Shea Alliance for shea butter, the Responsible Mica Initiative for ethical mica mining, and the Roundtable on Sustainable Palm Oil. These partnerships aim to improve traceability, fair labour practices, and biodiversity protection across the cosmetics supply chain.

In addition, in April 2025 Clarins appointed Arizona Muse — model, earth activist, and founder of the regenerative farming charity DIRT — as its first Global CSR Advocate, to help amplify key sustainability initiatives.

Clarins has a long-standing commitment to medical research via its support for Fondation Arthritis, an organization dedicated to funding research into chronic inflammatory rheumatic diseases. The foundation was originally created in 1989 by Jacques CourtinClarins (along with Denis Bloch) under the name ARP, motivated by personal experience — his wife suffered from severe rheumatoid polyarthritis. Since then, Clarins has covered all operating costs of Fondation Arthritis so that 100% of public donations go directly to research.

Today, the foundation is chaired by Dr. Olivier Courtin-Clarins and Clarins contributes by donating via its products: for example, part of the sales from its iconic Tonic Body Treatment Oil and Relax Treatment Oil is directed to Fondation Arthritis to support joint research initiatives. As of 2025, over €25 million has been provided to support research programs of the Arthritis Foundation.
