= Water canister =

Medium-sized portable container

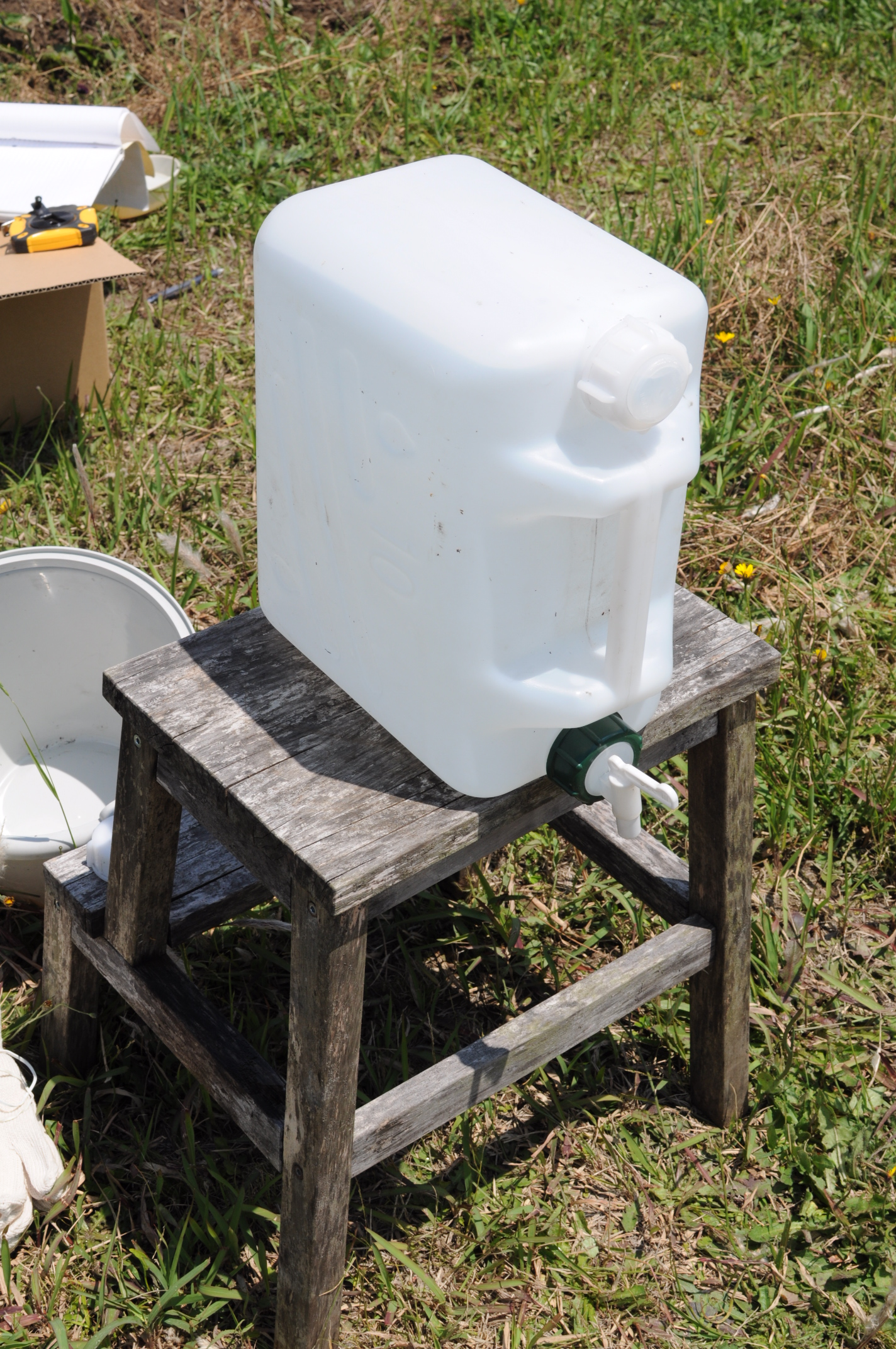
A water canister with a screw cap on top and tap on bottom.

A water container, water canister or water can is a medium-sized portable container for transport, storage and use of water. Large plastic bottles are sometimes called "canisters". Water canisters can be used for drinking water, wastewater or showering, as well as for excursions, camping, boat trips, in cabins without tap water, or as a household drinking water reserve in case of emergency.

Water canisters come in many different materials and shapes, but are usually made from rigid plastic with shape as a square or rectangular cube. Typical capacities lie around 5 to 25 liters for household use. If the water is to be used for drinking, the plastic of both the canister, screw cap and tap (also called water spigot) should be food-safe.

== Design ==
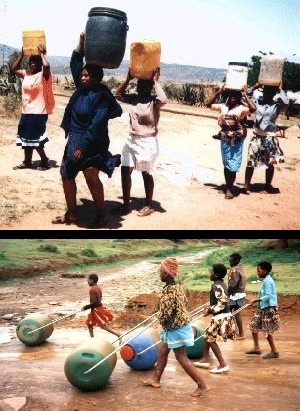
Illustration of the hippo water roller (bottom), a barrel-shaped container designed to be rolled along the ground, as opposed to carried

Water canisters are made in many different sizes, with some of the most common volumes for household use being for example 5 L, 10 L, 20 L or 25 L. There are no common standardized shapes or sizes. Some canisters are for example designed to easily and sturdily be stacked on top of each other. Stackable water container typically have thicker walls to handle the added weight of being stacked on top of each other. There are also designs which are collapsible and can be folded when not filled with a liquid.

Water canisters often have a carrying handle for easier carry. Some canisters are marked with several lines (for example in liters) to indicate the current amount of liquid, but there are also canisters without any level markings. Water canisters are usually made out of plastic, for instance polyethylene or high-density polyethylene, while caps and taps often are made of polypropylene or polyethylene. Some canisters have air vents which can be opened to avoid sloshing while emptying the container.

Large water canisters may require a bung wrench to be opened (similar to barrels).

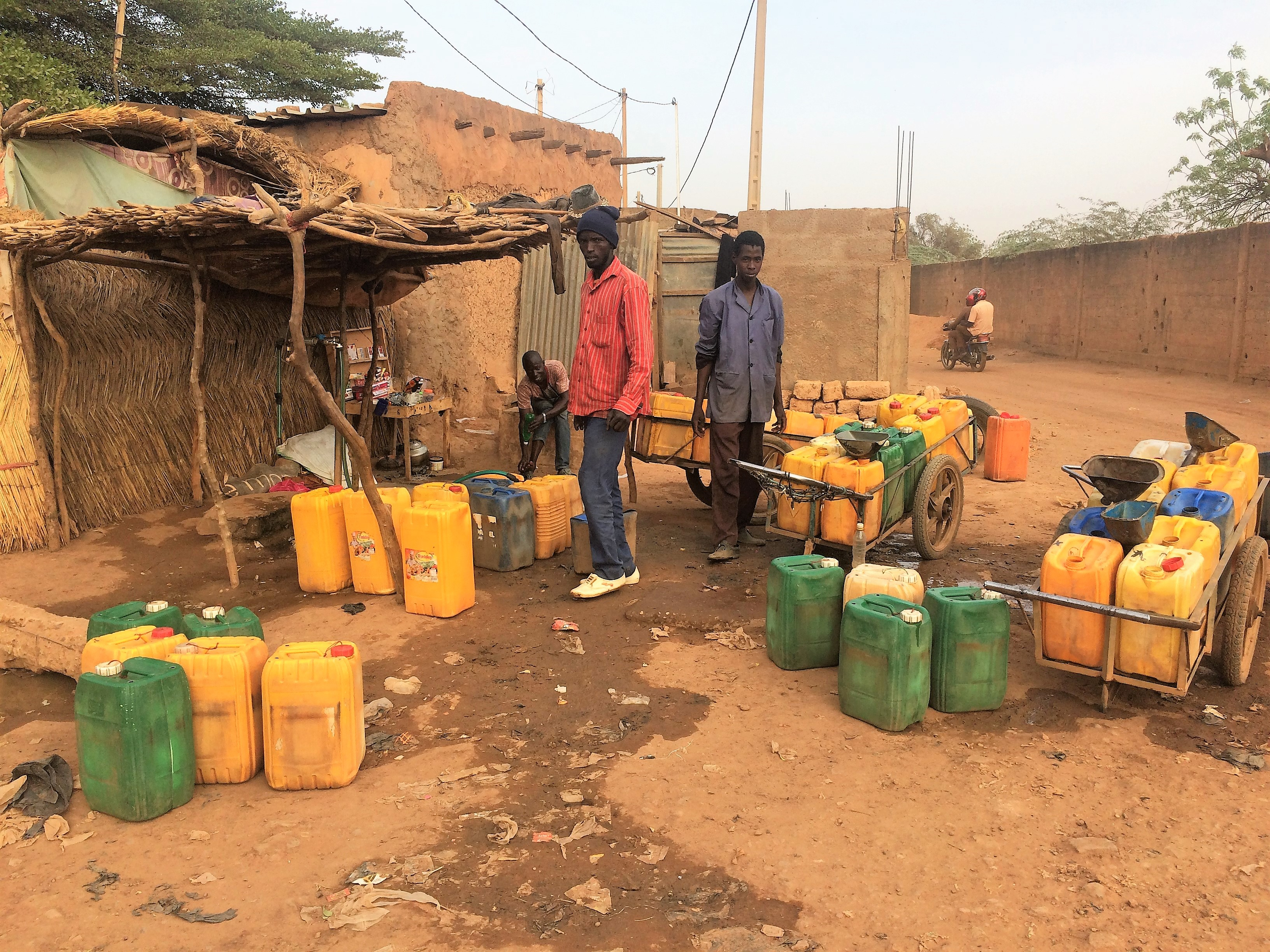
Square containers (here around 25 L) can be stacked more efficiently than cylindrical containers for transport.

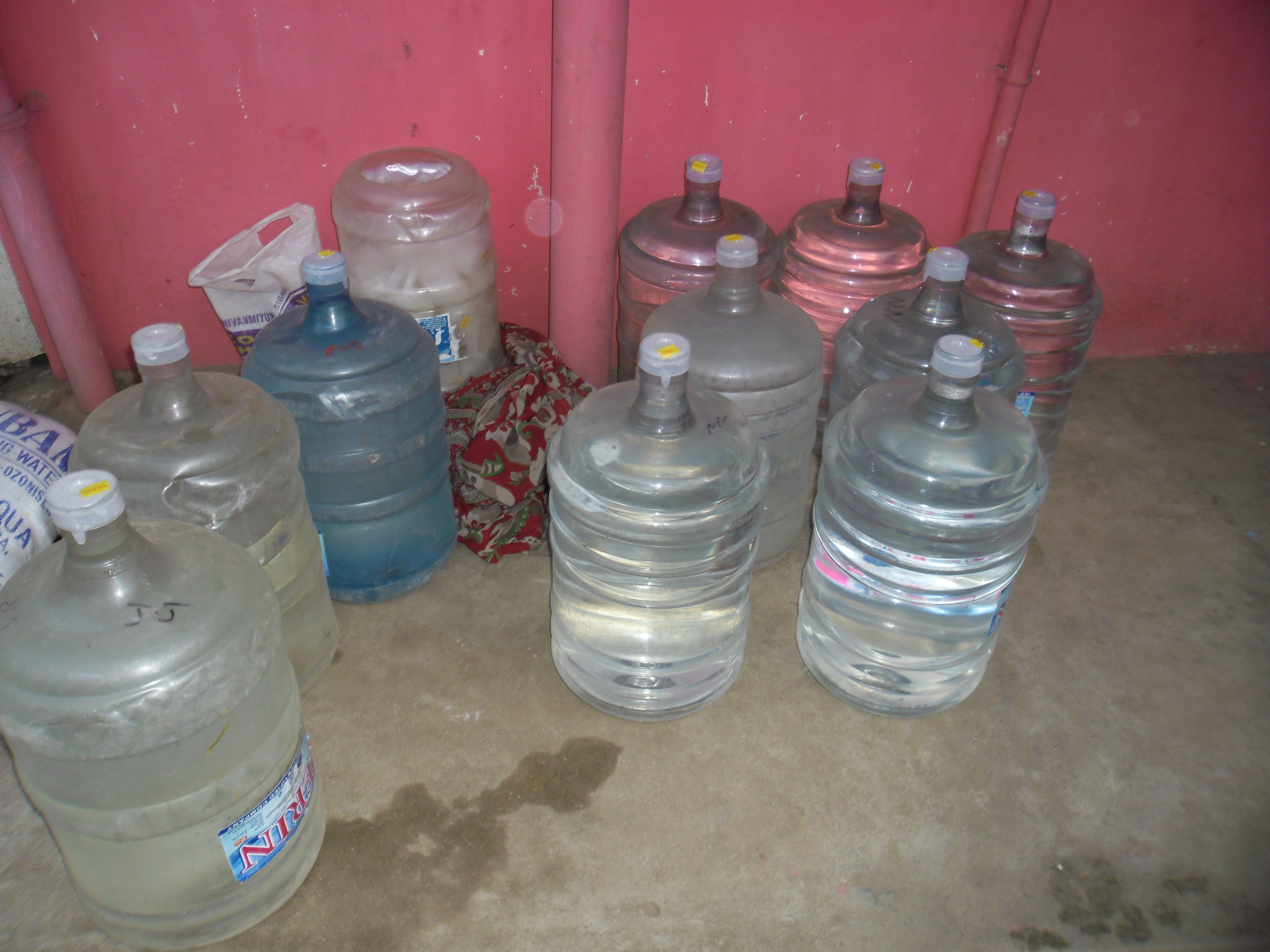
Cylindrical water jugs of the type used on water dispensers (typically around 15-30 liters).

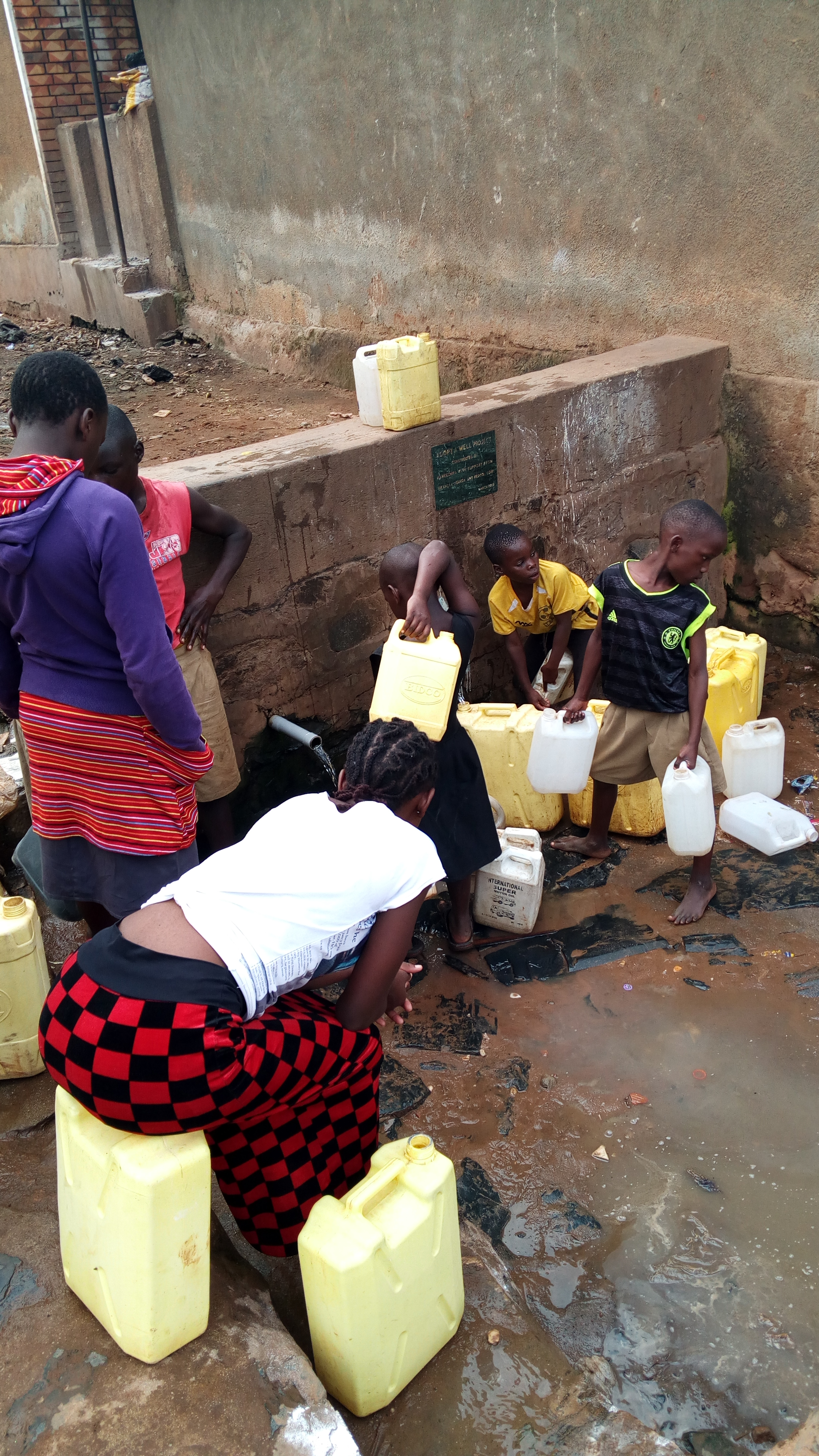
People in Uganda filling up water canisters (here around 5-20 L).

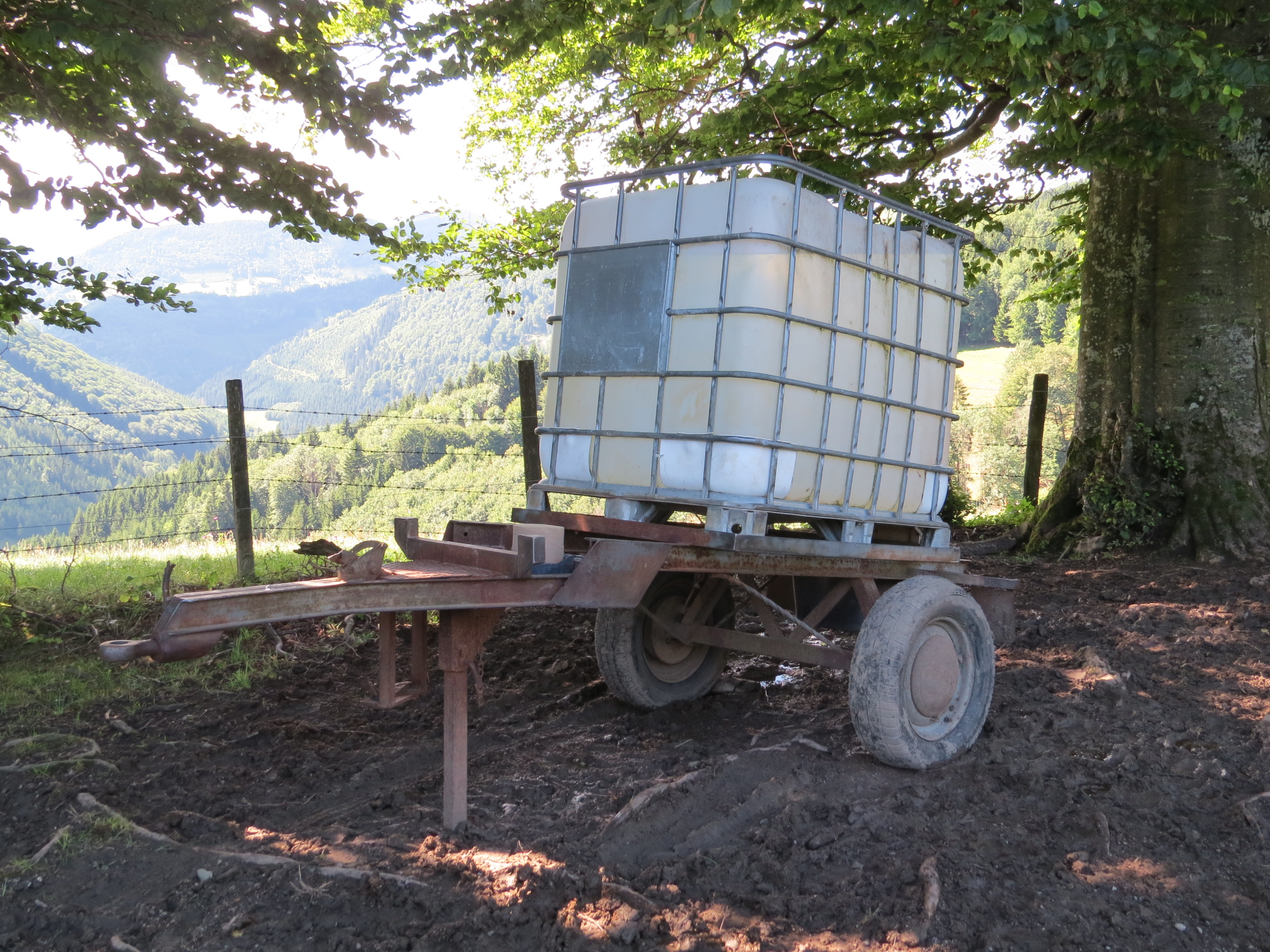
Intermediate bulk containers can be used as larger water canisters, typically holding around 1000 liters.

=== Thread types ===
Threads for caps and taps are standardized to some degree, with many European designs being based on various DIN standard sizes. Some common thread diameters on European water canisters are 40 mm, 45 mm, 50 mm and 60 mm. A tap can either be an integrated part of the container (for example protected by a ridge) or an accessory. On some designs, the tap is supposed to be replaced with a cap for storage or transport.

A table of some common water canister thread types is shown below:

Type	Opening diameter (mm)	External thread diameter (mm)	Pitch (mm)
51 mm DIN 51	50.5	53	5
61 mm DIN 60	55.8	59-60	6
61 mm DIN 61	55.8	61	6
71 mm DIN 71	66.5	71	6
96 mm DIN 96	?	?	?
2 in (51 mm) BSP / R2" steel drum fine thread	57.5	59	2.2
63 mm, 64 mm BSI	60	64.5	5
35 mm	32.7	33.5	3
2″ coarse Mauser L-ring	65	69.5	5.5
Tri-Sure, 2 in (51 mm) coarse thread	52.5	56	3.5
US drum thread	57.5	63.2	4.25

== Weight ==
The weight of just the container itself can for many practical purposes be considered negligible compared to the weight of the liquid it holds. Under this assumption, one can assume that the volume of a canister filled with water measured in liters will correspond to the same mass in kilograms. This will also hold true for other liquids with similar density to water. For example, a full 5 L water canister will thus weight a little over 5 kg, while a full 25 L water canister will weigh a little over 25 kg.

== Hygiene ==
With long-term storage, a biofilm can form on the inside of the canister, especially of the canister is exposed to sunlight. In this case, having a canister with a large diameter opening can make cleaning easier. Many water canisters are made of UV resistant food-grade plastic to limit UV damage to the container, as well as limit biological growth. Water canisters are often blue as this is effective at blocking UV light. For long term storage, it is recommended to store water containers in a dark room to limit bacterial growth. This is especially important with clear containers, as these let through light.

Typical plastics used in food-grade water containers are polyethylene terephthalate (PETE or PET, recycle code 1), high-density polyethylene (PVC, recycle code 2) and low-density polyethylene (LDPE, recycle code 4). The type of plastic should be identifiable from recycle codes stamped on the container.

Care should be taken to know the history of what has been stored previously on the containers, as well as making sure that containers are cleaned properly before use.

== Use for other liquids ==
Some water canisters and similar canisters can be suitable for storing other liquids, like for example many types of acids, bases, salt solutions and oils.

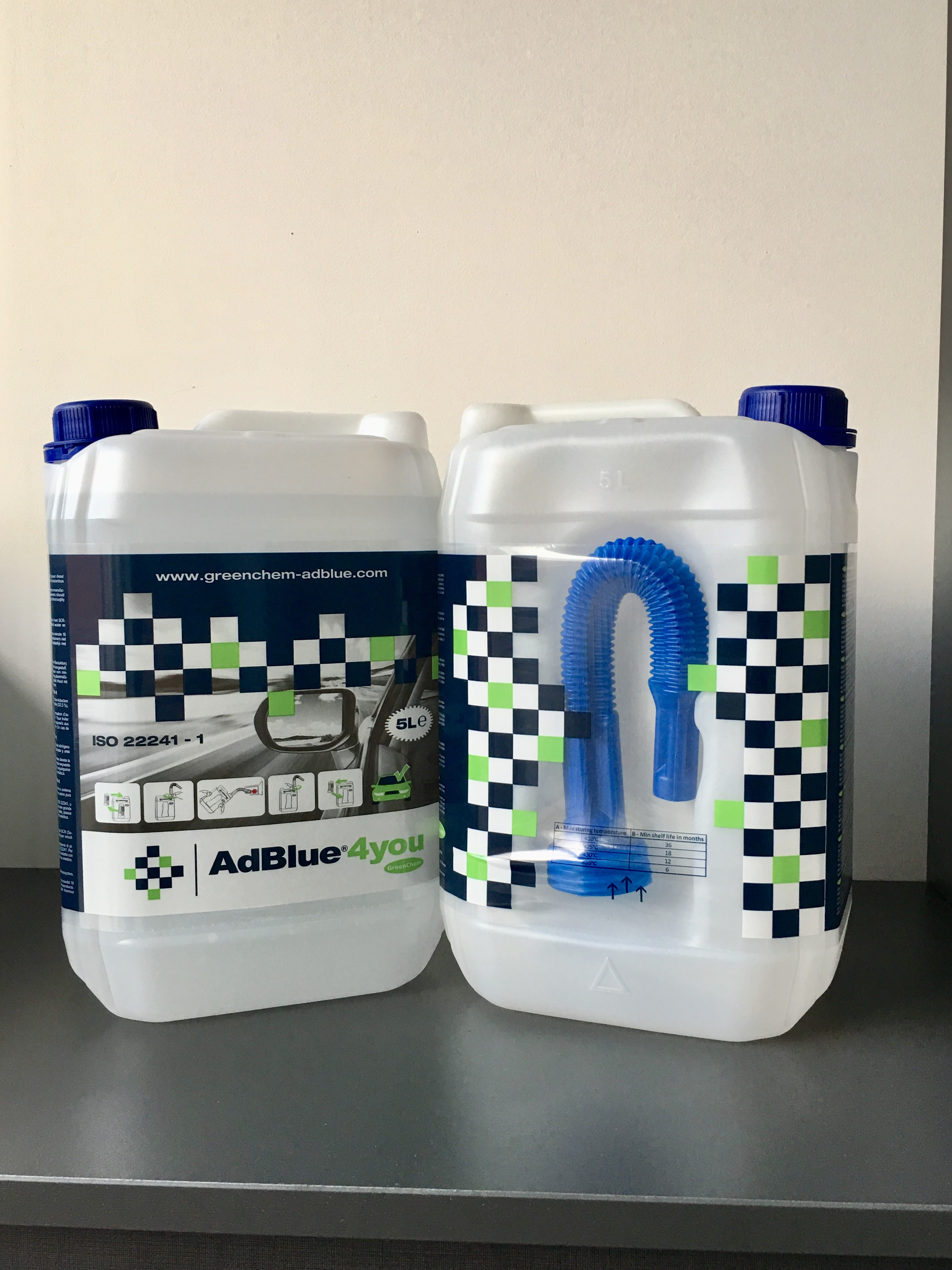
Diesel exhaust fluid packed in two 5L plastic bottles (canisters).

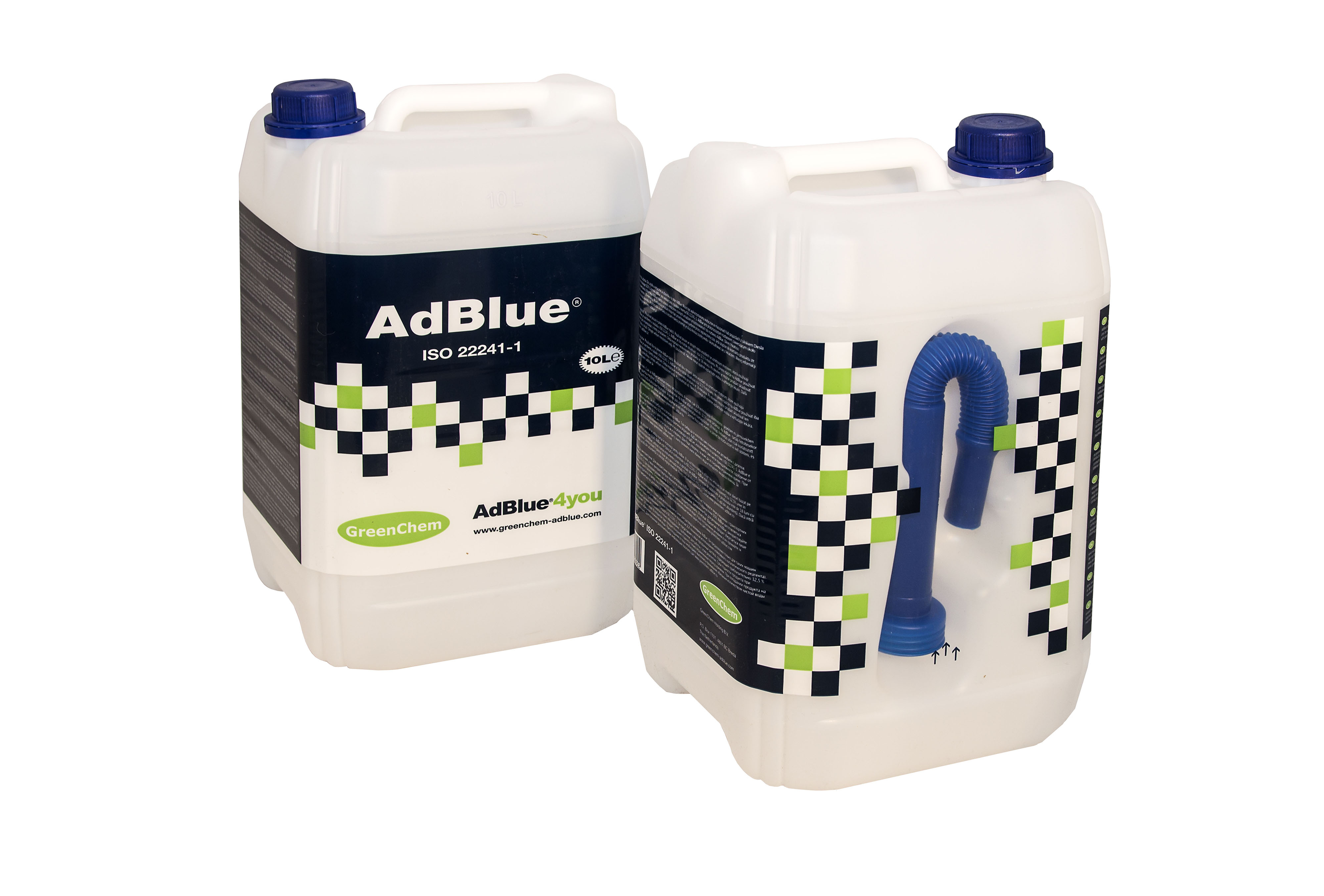
Diesel exhaust fluid packed in two 10L plastic bottles (canisters).

== See also ==
- Bottle
- Bottled water
- Water tank
- Rainwater tank
- Watering can

=== Related fluid containers ===
- Jerrycan (i.e. 20 liters)
- Barrel or drum (i.e. 200 liters)
- Intermediate bulk container (i.e. 1000 liters)
