= Reversibly assembled cellular composite materials =

Reversibly assembled cellular composite materials (RCCM) are three-dimensional lattices of modular structures that can be partially disassembled to enable repairs or other modifications. Each cell incorporates structural material and a reversible interlock, allowing lattices of arbitrary size and shape. RCCM display three-dimensional symmetry derived from the geometry as linked.

The discrete construction of reversibly assembled cellular composites introduces a new degree of freedom that determines global functional properties from the local placement of heterogeneous components. Because the individual parts are literally finite elements, a hierarchical decomposition describes the part types and their combination in a structure.

RCCM can be viewed as a "digital" material in which discrete parts link with a discrete set of relative positions and orientations. An assembler can place them using only local information. Placement errors can be detected and corrected by assembly reversal. These materials combine the size and strength of composites with the low density of cellular materials and the convenience of additive manufacturing.

== History ==
RCCM were introduced in 2013 by researchers at the MIT Center for Bits and Atoms.

== Behavior ==
=== Elasticity ===
RCCM lattices behave as an elastic solid in both tension and compression. They offer both a linear regime and a nonlinear super-elastic deformation mode a modulus an order of magnitude greater than for an ultralight material (12.3 megapascals at a density of 7.2 mg per cubic centimeter). Bulk properties can be predicted from component measurements and deformation modes determined by the placement of part types. Site locations are locally constrained, yielding structures that merge desirable features of carbon fiber composites, cellular materials and additive manufacturing.

Nonlinear elastic behavior derives from a multi-axial elastic instability of the lattice, a complex coordinated elastic buckling of the strut members. The resulting geometry is similar to a Jahn–Teller distortion of an octahedral complex with respect to orientation about the octahedral centers. Elastic folding or pleating can occur in three dimensions, likely a coordinated antisymmetric twisting stress response and/or plastic deformation.

=== Failure ===
Unlike conventional composites, which typically fail catastrophically, RCCM fail incrementally because of the non-linear deformation phase and the multiplicity of joints and links. These results matched finite-element simulations with finely-meshed rigid body models. In addition to convergence to the observed coordinated buckling mode, these simulations accurately predict the relative strength scaling observed in load test experiments. These results are consistent with the observation that open-cell lattice materials fail through micro-structural strut bending failures with σmax ∝. The simulations also suggest that the coordinated buckling phenomenon as well as the modulus measurements are not dominated by edge effects, with minimal influence on overall results beyond characteristic lengths exceeding several units.

Varying the locations of more and less rigid elements can trigger pure axial compression, simple uni-directional Euler buckling and complex buckling.

=== Scaling ===
Cellular composites extend stretch-dominated lattices to the ultralight regime (below ten milligrams per cubic centimeter). Performance depends positively on the framework rigidity of the lattice, node connectivity, slenderness of strut members and the scaling of the density cost of mechanical connections.

Conventional fiber composites make truss cores and structural frames, with bonded assembly of substructures or continuous fiber winding. Examples of such truss cores have been reported with continuous two-dimensional (2D) geometric symmetry and nearly ideal but highly anisotropic specific modulus scaling.

Three-dimensional open-cell lattice materials occur in natural and engineered systems, spanning many length scales. Their mechanical properties scale with relative density according to the geometry. They display either stretch-dominated or transverse beam bending-dominated microstructural behavior, based on periodic mechanical models. For Young’s modulus E, ideal stretch-dominated scaling with density ρ follows a proportional law E∝ρ, while common stochastic foams follow a quadratic law E∝ρ2 otherwise associated with transverse beam bending-dominated behavior. At ultralight densities a further reduced cubic scaling law E∝ρ3 is common, such as with aerogels and aerogel composites.

The dependence of scaling on geometry is seen in periodic lattice-based materials that have nearly ideal E∝ρ scaling, with high node connectedness relative to stochastic foams. These structures have previously been implemented only in relatively dense engineered materials. For the ultralight regime the E∝ρ2 scaling seen in denser stochastic cellular materials applies to electroplated tubular nickel micro-lattices, as well as carbon-based open-cell stochastic foams, including carbon microtube aerographite and graphene cork.

== Design ==
Making the connections stiffer and stronger than the strut members means that stress response is governed by the struts. Extending dimensional scaling methods to include the connections shows that the mass density cost of robust connections – which scale with the strut's cross-sectional area – is low for ultralight materials, where strut diameter dominates mass density scaling. The relative density (ρ/ρs) of these materials is the sum of the relative density contribution of the strut members (ρm/ρs) and the relative density contribution of the connections (ρc/ρs). The strut members have a thickness t and length L. The connections transfer forces through load-bearing surface contacts, requiring that the characteristic dimensions of the connections scale with the cross section of the attached strut members, t2, because this dimension determines the maximum stress transferable through the joint.

These definitions give a cubic scaling relation between the relative mass contribution of the joints and the strut's thickness-to-length ratio (ρc/ρs ∝ Cc(t/L)3, where Cc is the connection contribution constant determined by the lattice geometry). The struts' relative density contribution scales quadratically with the thickness-to-length ratio of the struts (ρm/ρs ∝ Cm (t/L)2), which agrees with the literature on classical cellular materials. Mechanical properties (such as modulus and strength) scale with overall relative density, which in turn scales primarily with the strut and not the connection, considering only open cell lattices with slender struts [t/L < 0.1 (7)], given that the geometric constants Cc and Cm are of the same order of magnitude [ρ/ρs ∝ Cc (t/L)3 + Cm (t/L)2]. The density cost of the mechanical joints decreases with increasing strut member slenderness (decreasing t/L) and decreasing relative density.

Tiling the cross-shaped parts forms the lattice structure. Each part contributes four conjoined strut members to one locally central node and one strut to four peripheral nodes. A shear clip inserted through the four coincident connection holes links the cells.

Each cell includes aligned fiber composite beams and looped fiber load-bearing holes that reversibly chain together to form volume-filling lattices. Mass-produced cells can be assembled to fill arbitrary structural shapes, with a resolution prescribed by the part scale that matches the variability of an application's boundary stress. The periodic nature of assemblies simplifies behavior analysis and prediction.

=== Cuboct geometry ===
A “cuboct” cubic lattice of vertex connected octahedrons, similar to the perovskite mineral structure provides a regular polyhedral unit cell that satisfies Maxwell’s rigidity criterion and has a coordination number z of eight. The dependence of the relative density on the coordination number is small relative to the dependence on strut diameter. Winding the reinforcing fibers around the connection holes optimizes their load bearing capacity, while coupling them to struts which themselves retain uniaxial fiber orientation.

== Comparison with traditional composite materials ==
Carbon-fiber reinforced composite materials can improve efficiency in engineered systems (for example, airframes) by reducing structural weight for given strength and stiffness requirements, but present challenges with manufacturing and certification. High-performance composite components employ many continuous fibers that span the shape of a component, and are embedded in a resin matrix. Such parts typically require custom tooling, pressurization for consolidation and heated curing. Joining such parts adds complexity and structural vulnerabilities.

RCCM eliminate the need for custom tooling because parts can be incrementally added/removed. Their construction, modification, repair and re-use can all employ the same reversible linking process. Heterogeneous elements can be incorporated in structures with functions determined by their relative placement. Exact assembly of discrete cellular composites offers new properties and performance not available with the analog alternatives of continuously depositing or removing material.
