= Percy Tucker =

South African ticket booking agent and author (1928–2021)

- Born: 10 July 1928; Benoni, Gauteng, South Africa
- Died: 29 January 2021 (aged 92); Cape Town, South Africa
- Education: University of the Witwatersrand
- Occupations: ticket booking agent and author
- Known for: pioneer of South African entertainment industry and launched world's first electronic theatre booking system.
- Website: percytucker.com

Percy Tucker (10 July 1928 – 29 January 2021) was a South African ticket booking agent and author. He launched the first electronic theatre booking system in the world in 1971. He was regarded as a pioneer in the entertainment industry of South Africa. He was also nicknamed as South Africa's ticket master.

== Early life and education ==
Percy Tucker was born on 10 July 1928, in Benoni, Gauteng. His family lived across the street from Benoni Town Hall and at the age of 10 he rented the lounge suite of his family home to a touring theatre company, receiving tickets to their production in exchange. He completed his primary education at the Benoni High School and pursued his higher education at the University of the Witwatersrand where he obtained his B. Com. In 1942, he became a backstage worker and later was stage manager at the East Rand Theatre Club.

== Career ==
In 1954, he opened Show Service which was eventually the first South African professional theatre office in Johannesburg. It was also the first centralised ticket-booking agency in South Africa. His decision to pursue his professional career as a ticket seller did not go well with his father as he was not pleased to see his son doing such a meander job after graduating from university.

Tucker travelled to the United States in 1969, looking for a computerised means of handling inventory. He and other investors purchased the Computicket software and an IBM System/360 Model 50. In 1971, Tucker launched Computicket which was the world's first full-fledged operative computerised, centralised ticket booking system which drastically changed the fortunes in the global entertainment industry. It also changed the complexion of the marketing strategy of entertainment tickets worldwide.

He retired in 1994 having been CEO of Computicket since its inception. After his retirement, he focused on his autobiography titled Just the Ticket - My 50 Years in Show Business about the history of South African theatre. It was published in 1997.

== Later life and death ==
Tucker was partner to Graham Dickason for 50 years until his death in November 2020. Tucker himself died from complications of COVID-19 on 29 January 2021, at the age of 92, during the COVID-19 pandemic in South Africa.
