= Mulalo Doyoyo =

South African engineer, inventor and professor (1970-2024)

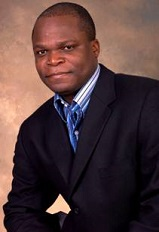
- Born: August 13, 1970; Venda, Limpopo, South Africa
- Died: March 11, 2024 (aged 53); Midrand, Gauteng, South Africa
- Citizenship: South Africa
- Education: Massachusetts Institute of Technology; Brown University; University of Cape Town
- Known for: Applied mechanics; Ultralight materials; Green building; Renewable energy; Ballistics
- Spouse: Thato Doyoyo
- Scientific career
- Fields: Engineering
- Workplaces: Massachusetts Institute of Technology; Georgia Institute of Technology
- Thesis: Experimental studies of subsonic penetration in silica glasses and ceramics

Mulalo Doyoyo OMS FRSA (13 August 1970 – 11 March 2024) was a South African engineer, inventor, and professor.

Doyoyo was a researcher in applied mechanics, ultralight materials, green building, renewable energy, and other fields of engineering. He lectured in different engineering disciplines including ocean engineering, civil and environmental engineering, and mechanical engineering.

Doyoyo invented a cementless concrete, Cenocell, and Amoriguard coatings.

He died on March 11, 2024.

== Early life and education ==
Mulalo Doyoyo was born at William Edie Hospital in Tshidimbini Venda to Khorommbi Doyoyo and Mudzuli (née Dzaga) of Vondwe village. Venda was a bantustan in northern South Africa during apartheid and is now part of the Limpopo Province.

He started his bantu education schooling at Vondwe Lower Primary School in 1977 and then moved on to Tshidimbini Higher Primary School in 1981. He joined Tshidimbini Secondary School in 1984 where he studied until 1985. In 1986, he registered at Mbilwi Secondary School. He was later voted as the head boy of the school, matriculating in 1988.

While he was attending the University of Venda, he obtained an exceptional scores on an IQ test by Anglo American and was awarded a scholarship to study mechanical engineering at the University of Cape Town, which at the time was designed for bantu education matriculates. He resided in Smuts Hall, where he became a tutor in science and engineering, eventually becoming a head tutor. He became a publication officer of the student engineering council, a student representative of the South African Institute of Aerospace Engineers, and a founder of the student aerospace society in the faculty of engineering and the built environment.

Doyoyo's honors thesis was on the design and construction of mechanical equipment to investigate false brinelling of heavy-duty bearings in electric motors. He earned masters' degrees in solid mechanics and applied mathematics in 1995 and 1996, respectively.

His doctoral research was based on the field of ballistics focusing on the design of light-weight armors. He defended his doctoral thesis in engineering in 1999. His thesis was entitled, "Experimental studies of subsonic penetration in silica glasses and ceramics". He employed granular material physics to describe fragment ejecta behaviour and to predict the impact depth of projectiles as a function of impact velocity. Noting an anomalous behaviour from the experimental observations, he applied the variational perturbation theory to reveal and explain the role played by the increase in mass density during the failure of brittle materials under dynamic compression. In 1999, he accepted a postdoctoral researcher position from the Massachusetts Institute of Technology to enhance his studies in applied mechanics.

== Academic career ==
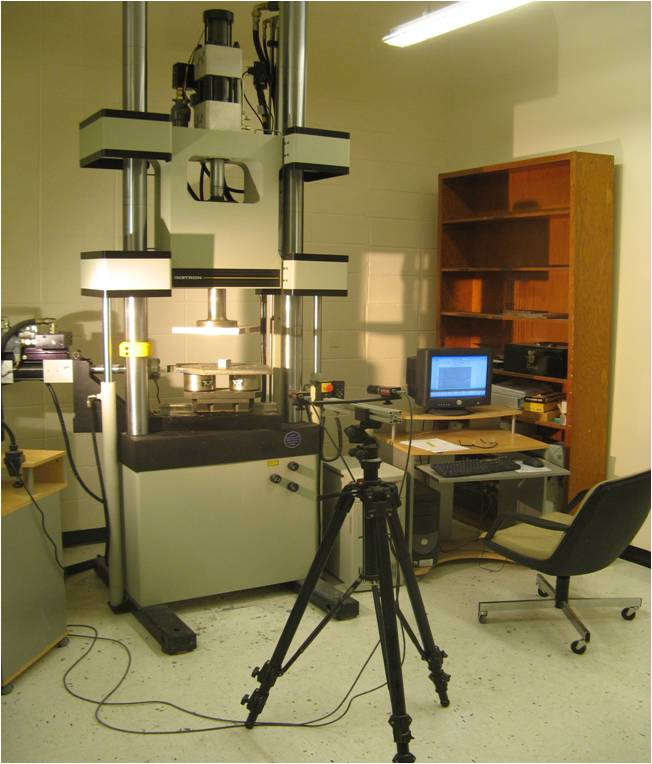
Biaxial universal testing machine

Doyoyo collaborated with researchers in the Joint MIT-Industry Consortium on Ultralight Metal Body Structures, the Cambridge-MIT Institute, and the Next Generation Vehicles Initiative. He performed experiments at the impact and crashworthiness laboratory on cellular solids including metallic foams and honeycombs.

The challenge was to come up with new experimental techniques, specimens, and devices to test soft solids under extreme multidimensional crash loads, to simulate a typical collision event. He developed a trapezoid-shaped specimen to deduce the local stress-strain relation for metal foams to be incorporated into finite element analysis (FEA) codes.

For the constitutive equation and crash failure surfaces, he developed a butterfly-shaped specimen, and modified the Arcan apparatus, deriving equations for determining shear and compressive or tensile stresses in the test section of the specimen. Due to the difficulty of handling the butterfly-shaped specimen, he developed a Universal Biaxial Testing Device with an altered specimen geometry.

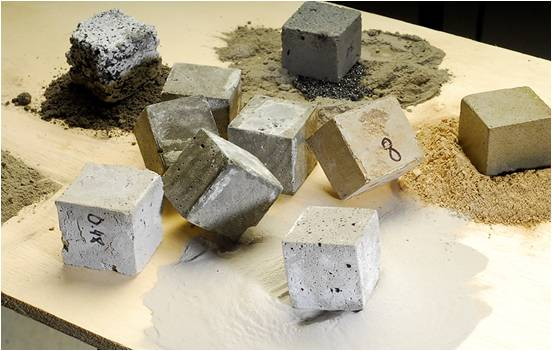
Cenocell samples

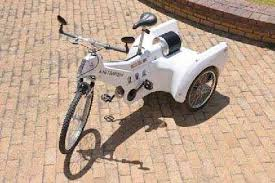
"Ahifambeni" hydrogen motorbike

He left MIT in 2004 to lecture at the school of civil and environmental engineering at the Georgia Institute of Technology (Georgia Tech). He created the ultralight systems laboratory that was dedicated to experimental research on ultralight materials.

Applying the foundation and plate theories of structural mechanics, he proved that as an internal reinforcing element, a truss lattice structure has the ability to reduce the weight of a pressure vessel by decreasing its skin thickness while improving its fracture strength. This led to the invention disclosure of microtruss pressure vessels. These pressure vessels accommodate non-round shapes resulting in increased safety, driving range, and cabin space for hydrogen vehicles.

In an effort to develop energy storage systems for large-scale traditional and renewable energy sources, he began research collaboration with electricity generation companies. As one of the results of this collaboration, he developed Cenocell, a patented concrete-like material that is based on fly ash without the addition of Portland cement. Fly ash is a pollutant byproduct of coal-fired power plants, cement production, paper manufacturing, and mining operations. Cenocell microstructure resembles that of a natural gas reservoir rock.

As of 2006, he became interested in doing research aligning with his homeland's Reconstruction and Development Programme (RDP) He started work with his graduate students on green building and renewable energy. Between 2007 and 2009, he was appointed as a professor extraordinare and later a visiting research and innovation chair at the Tshwane University of Technology. This afforded him the opportunity to collaborate with local researchers on the RDP.

This collaboration inspired him to create Retecza (resource-driven technology concept center). During its inception in South Africa in 2008, the organisation welcomed cross-disciplinary researcher and industrialist participants from around the world. One of the outcomes of Retecza was the design and construction of a hydrogen motorbike named "Ahifambeni".

== Entrepreneurship ==
After leaving Georgia Tech, he moved to Midrand, Johannesburg, where he created an experimental laboratory for environmental-friendly chemicals. Since its founding in 2012, the laboratory has generated several inventions. He also taught mechanical engineering briefly at the University of Johannesburg.Sasol Chemcity recognised the Midrand lab activities and provided funding through its program for small and medium-sized enterprises.

Working in collaboration with concrete manufacturers and mining companies, he developed "green" chemical binders Solunexz and Glunexz for coal dust, construction aggregates, and charcoal. With continued support from Sasol, he developed Amoriguard, a non-volatile organic compound paint and skim coating based on tailings and industrial waste. Amoriguard has received Agrément certificate. In 2014, he worked on flushing solar-powered toilets that operate as a miniature waste-treatment plant. This technology based on nanofiltration and anaerobic digestion is implemented in places where water supply and sanitation are scarce. In 2016, while developing acid bricks, Doyoyo designed and manufactured Ecocast brick making machines that save water and energy, while adaptable to off-grid communities. In 2023, Doyoyo invented a "liquid cement", a type of specialty chemicals that is utilized as a replacement of Portland cement.
