= Percy Amoils =

South African ophthalmologist and biomedical engineering inventor

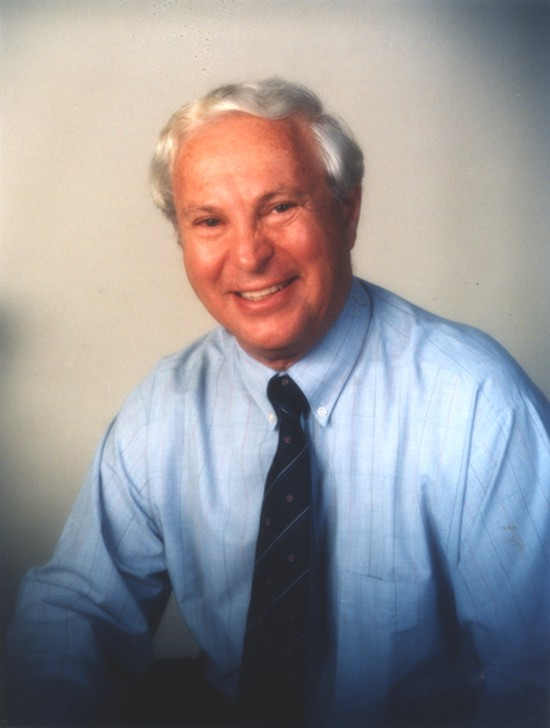
- Born: Selig Percy Amoils; 1933 (age 92–93); Johannesburg, South Africa
- Education: University of Witwatersrand
- Known for: invented the Retinal cryoprobe and the rotary epithelial scrubber
- Medical career
- Profession: Ophthalmologist

Selig Percy Amoils OMS FRCS, born 1933, is a South African ophthalmologist and biomedical engineering inventor. In 1965, Amoils refined the cryoextraction method of cataract surgery by developing a cryoprobe that was cooled through the Joule-Thomson effect of gas expansion. His system is still widely used in the fields of ophthalmology and gynaecology.

Amoils was also awarded a patent for his "rotary epithelial scrubber", an improvement on the brush first developed by Ioannis Pallikaris that removes corneal epithelial cells in preparation for photorefractive keratectomy. Another development of his in 1970, was the diamond vitrectomy cutter, various instruments enabling micro-control of blade depth in radial keratotomy, as well as the oval comparator, or astigmometer, to control astigmatism after cataract surgery.

== Career ==
Born, raised, and educated in Johannesburg, South Africa, Amoils briefly studied mechanical engineering prior to attending medical school at the University of Witwatersrand where he earned his MB and BCh in 1956. His specialist training was with Baragwanath Hospital in Soweto, Moorfields Eye Hospital in London, and Massachusetts Eye and Ear Infirmary as a clinical fellow and research scientist specializing in retinal diseases and surgery and glaucoma.

He advanced cryosurgery for cataracts and retinal detachments during 1962 at Baragwanath hospital in Soweto. This led to the Joule-Thomson effect cryoprobe in 1965, using carbon dioxide or nitrous oxide to cool the probe, which could then be reheated electrically, or by warm gas to release the probe if the resulting iceball also adhered to the iris; this dramatically changed cataract and retinal surgery. Amoils achieved wide recognition for his invention and in 1975 received a Queen's Award for Technological Innovation. His cryoprobe has since been on display in the Kensington Museum in London.

In 1994, Amoils removed a cataract from South African President Nelson Mandela's left eye. In 2006, President Thabo Mbeki awarded him the silver Order of Mapungubwe for "excellence in the field of ophthalmology and for inspiring his colleagues in the field of science".

== Publications ==
- Cryosurgery in ophthalmology (Textbook) Pitman Medical (1975) ISBN 0-272-00468-5
