= Amoriguard =

Type of paint

Amoriguard is a water-based paint with fillers based on recycled industrial waste. The colour has an effective 70% mass of solids, which occupy a volume of at least 55% excluding water. It was invented in South Africa by Mulalo Doyoyo and co-developed by Ryan Purchase.

Typical Amoriguard earth tones on cement tiles

Substances in the paint such as volatile organic compounds, ammonia, formaldehyde, lead, alkyl phenol ethoxylate and glycol are low in quantity or absent. It is manufactured below critical pigment volume concentration (CPVC) which means that most voids between pigment particles in the dried film are filled with solid particles as opposed to air. The paint is hydrophobic and chemical-resistant.
