= Ultralight material =

Ultralight materials are solids with a density of less than 10 mg/cm^{3}, including silica aerogels, carbon nanotube aerogels, aerographite, metallic foams, polymeric foams, and metallic microlattices. The density of air is about 1.275 mg/cm^{3}, which means that the air in the pores contributes significantly to the density of these materials in atmospheric conditions. They can be classified by production method as aerogels, stochastic foams, and structured cellular materials.

== Properties ==
Ultralight materials are solids with a density of less than 10 mg/cm^{3}. Ultralight material is defined by its cellular arrangement and its stiffness and strength that make up its solid constituent. They include silica aerogels, carbon nanotube aerogels, aero graphite, metallic foams, polymeric foams, and metallic micro lattices. Ultralight materials are produced to have the strength of bulk-scaled properties at a micro-size. Also, they are designed to not compress even under extreme pressure, which show that they are stiff and strong.

Ultralight material also has elastic properties. Some ultralight materials are designed with more pores to allow the structure to have better heat transfer, which is needed for many materials, like pipes for example. In compression experiments, ultralight materials almost always show complete recovery from strains exceeding 50%.

== Applications ==
Ultralight foams are produced by 3D interconnected hollow tubes at the micrometer and nanometer levels. These foams are used to quickly and selectively absorb oils from water surfaces that are under magnetic field. The foam can absorb 100 times its own weight. Plywood faced sandwiches are thermal insulators made with low density fiber boards with an ultralight foam interior. The plywood faced sandwich provide insulation properties superior to those without ultralight-weight properties.

== Possible advances ==
Parts of massive bridges could be made from ultra strong, lightweight material in the future. These bridges would also be insulated from heat and cold. Scientists at MIT have been working to make a material that is as strong as steel but has the density of a plastic bag. The biggest hurdle in making this material is the lack of industrial manufacturing capability for producing them.

Ultralight material is constantly subjected to compression and accidental physical damage or abuse during practical applications. Recent advances in ultralight magnetic framework has allowed structures made from lightweight material to self repair their structure when it is compromised. Ultralight materials are capable of healing because of pH induced coordination between iron and catecholic compounds.

== Examples ==
=== Aerogel ===
The first ultralight material, aerogel was first created by Samuel Stephens Kistler in 1931.

=== Stochastic foam ===
Graphene foams and graphite foams are examples of stochastic foams.

=== Structured cellular materials ===
Structured cellular materials can be remarkably strong despite very low density.

Reversibly assembled cellular composite materials enable tailorable composite materials properties, to the ideal linear specific stiffness scaling regime. Using projection microstereolithography, octet microlattices have also been fabricated from polymers, metals, and ceramics.

The design of the high performing lattices mean that the individual struts making up the materials do not bend. The materials are therefore exceptionally stiff and strong for their weight.

== Bibliography ==
- SS Kistler (1931). "Coherent Expanded Aerogels and Jellies". Nature. 127 (3211): 741. Bibcode:1931Natur.127..741K. doi:10.1038/127741a0.
- KC Cheung; N Gershenfeld (September 2013). "Reversibly Assembled Cellular Composite Materials". Science. 341 (6058): 1219–1221. Bibcode:2013Sci...341.1219C. doi:10.1126/science.1240889. PMID 23950496.
