= Cenocell =

Concrete material using fly ash in place of cement

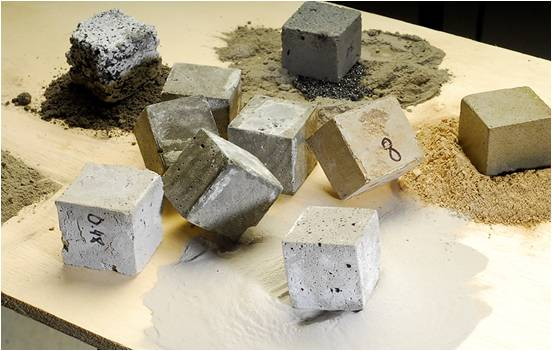
Cenocell samples

Cenocell is a patented concrete-like structural material that is manufactured without the addition of Portland cement. It was invented by Mulalo Doyoyo at the Georgia Institute of Technology.

Cenocell is produced from a chemical reaction involving fly ash or bottom ash and various organic chemicals. The chemical reaction produces foaming, and results in grey slurry that resembles bread dough. The mixture is then cured in ovens at temperatures near 100°C. The result is a homogenous mixture with a high strength and low weight.

== See also ==
- Sulfur concrete
