= Saddam Maake =

South African football fan

Freddie Maake is a South African football fan who is the president of the South African National Supporters (SANASU) and has claimed to be the inventor of the vuvuzela instrument.

== Career ==
Maake is nicknamed "Saddam" after former Iraqi dictator Saddam Hussein. He claimed to have invented the vuvuzela instrument in 1965. He has been a supporter of Kaizer Chiefs since their formation in 1970.

Maake started attending South Africa national soccer team games in 1992. He is president of the South African National Supporters (SANASU).

== Personal life ==
He has fifteen children and has divorced three times.
