= Hippo water roller =

Container for transporting water

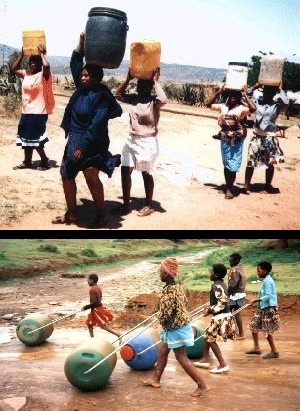
Upper: traditional method of carrying water; lower: more water can be transported easily using the roller

The Hippo water roller, or Hippo roller, is a device used to carry drinking water more easily and efficiently than traditional methods, particularly in the developing world and rural areas. It consists of a barrel-shaped container that holds the water and can roll along the ground, and a handle attached to the axis of the barrel. Currently deployed in rural Africa, its simple and purpose-built nature makes it an example of appropriate technology. The devices cost around $125 each and they are mainly distributed by NGOs.

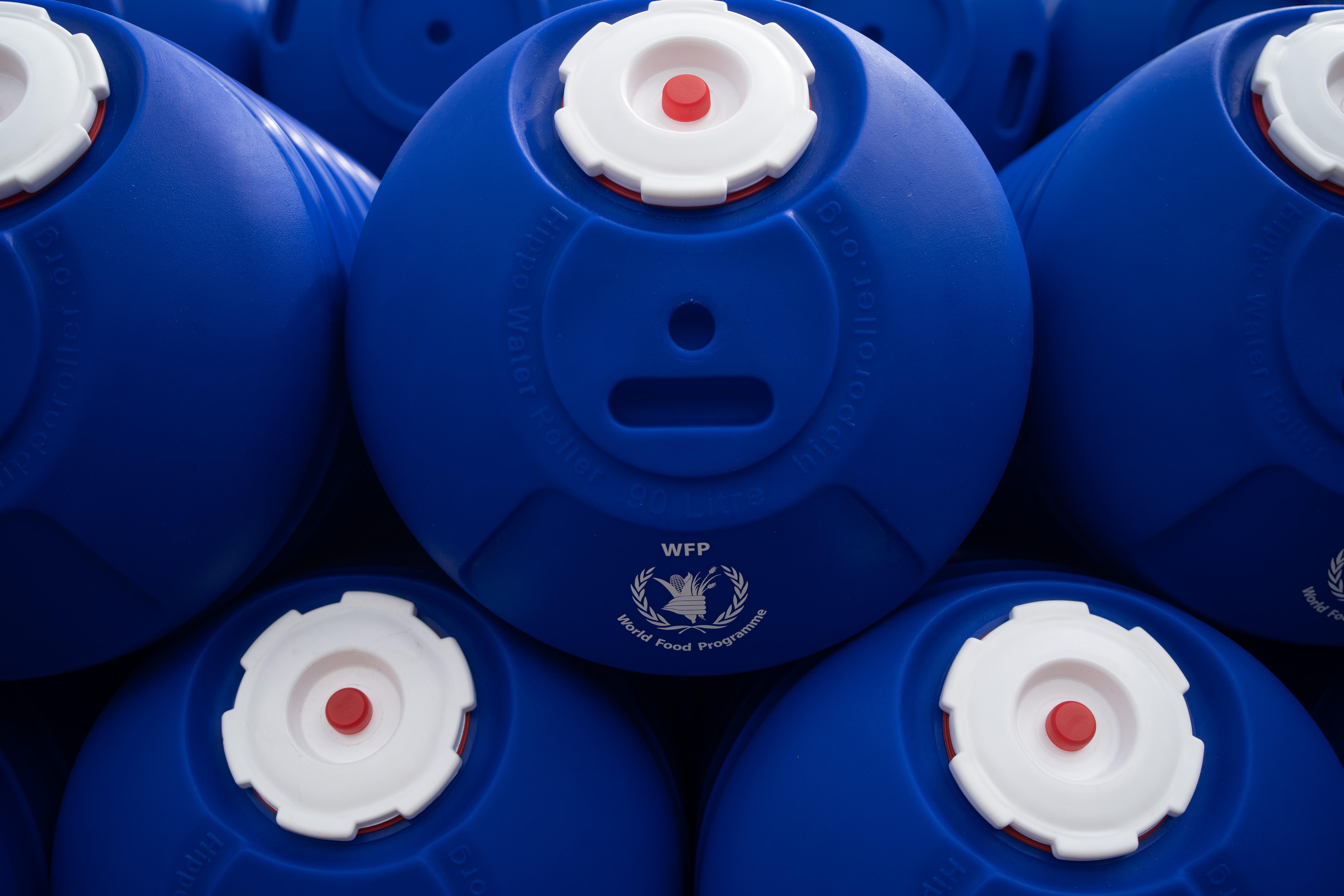
Hippo Rollers with the World Food Programme (WFP) logo printed on it. The WFP is one of the NGOs that distributed Hippo Rollers.

== Physical design ==
The drum of the Hippo water roller is made from UV-stabilized linear low-density polyethylene and is designed to cope with the rough surfaces found in rural areas. The drum's volume is 90 litres (24 US gal). It has a large, 135-millimetre (5.3 in) diameter opening for easy filling and cleaning. The size of the opening was originally determined by the availability of a large enough lid. The lid then on its part determined the roll radius of the roller, since enough clearance was required with the lid fitted to keep the latter clear from the ground and any obstacles which might damage it. The lid was eventually further recessed on later models to enhance its protection.

The newly designed Utility Cap allows users to conveniently and hygienically draw water without contaminating the contents of the drum and ensures hygienic storage of clean water. It can be replaced with a regular bottle cap if damaged or lost.

The steel handle allows the roller to be pushed or pulled over difficult and very rough terrain. The overall width of earlier rollers with the handle attached was determined by measuring the average width of a standard doorway and sized to allow it to be pulled through freely. This parameter together with the roll radius and the rounded shoulders eventually determined the average volume of 90 liters. The dimension of Hippo Rollers changed in later generations, the diameter is slightly decreased to fit better in a shipping container while the drum is lengthened. The width of later rollers with the handle attached is increased to 80 cm and fits through a common 32-or-36-inch (81 or 91 cm) door. Although the later Hippo Rollers with handles attached are wider than a 30-inch (76 cm) door, they can still be maneuvered through the doorway.

The steel handle is fitted with special polymer end-caps to reduce friction and wear and prolong the life of the pivot cavities in the drum.

During development, a water-filled roller was drawn behind a vehicle over a dirt road at 20 km/h for 15 km without any significant signs of wear on both the roller's outer surface or pivot cavities.

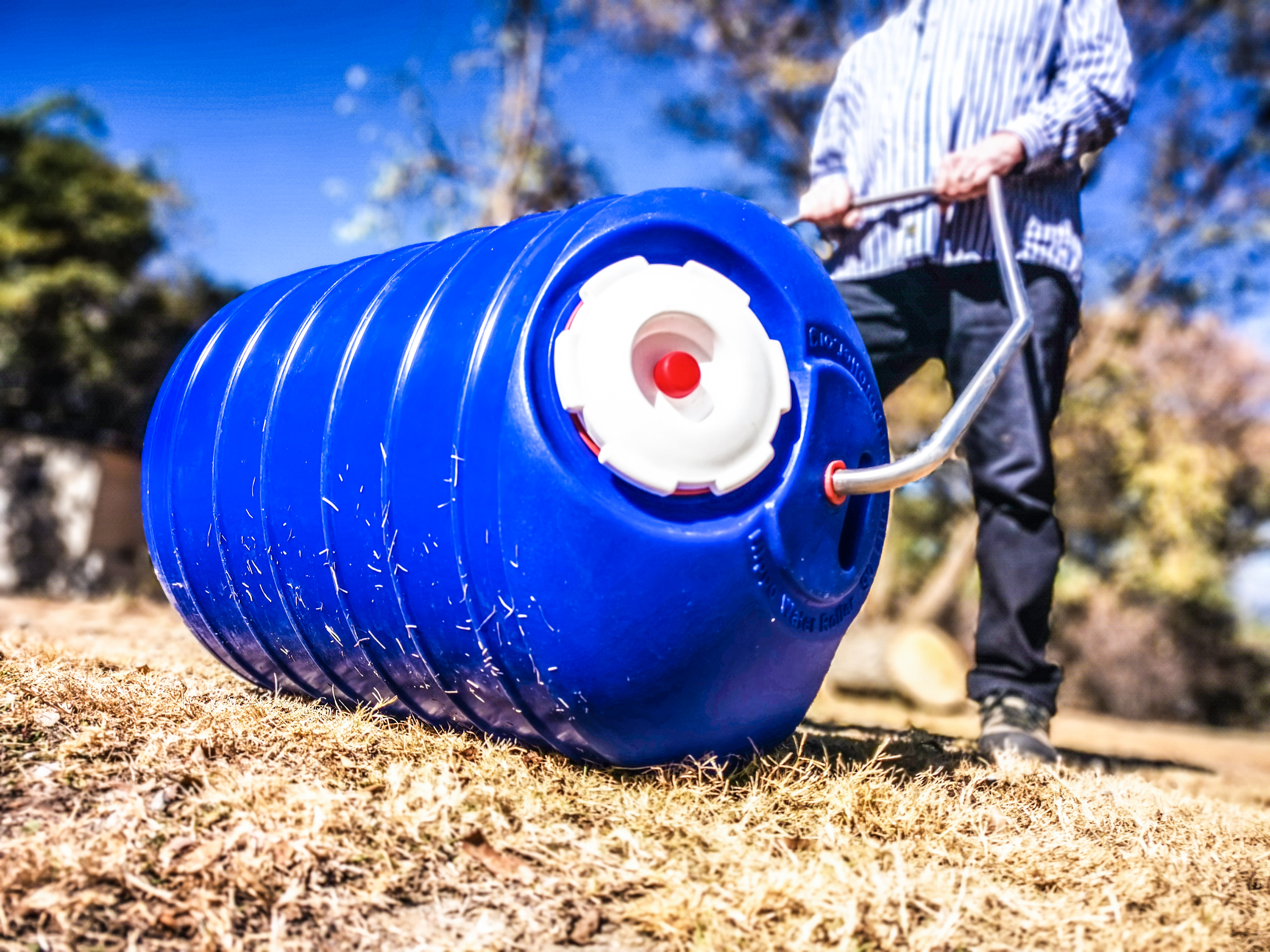
A close up image of a Hippo Roller, showing the drum, the larger (white) and smaller cap (red), the stainless steel handle, and the friction-reducing polymer end-caps.

The roller is rounded at the shoulders to simplify tilting when wanting to pour from the full roller. However, the roller is also very stable in the upright position when it rests on a small, flat surface. The roller has hand grips at the bottom and top to make emptying the container easier.

== History ==
Invented in 1991, the barrel, originally called "Aqua Roller", was the brainchild of two engineers of South Africa, Pettie Petzer and Johan Jonker. Both men were inspired by the impact of water crisis in a rural environment. They were considering a wheelbarrow-style design as an improved method, with far less risk of neck injury compared to the traditional method of a large bucket balanced on top of the head. The wheel was the most expensive component. And then Pettie had the "eureka moment" of putting the water inside the wheel. It was renamed in 1993 to give it a more African-sounding name.

Petzer and Jonker were recognized for their invention in 1997 with the "Design for Development Award" by the South African Bureau of Standards and its Design Institute.

Former South African President, Nelson Mandela, expressed his support for the Hippo roller, believing it "will positively change the lives of millions of our fellow South Africans".

== Claimed benefits ==
It is claimed that approximately five times the amount of water can be transported in less time with far less effort than the traditional method of carrying 20 litres (5.3 US gal) on the head.

Claimed benefits include:

- time savings (fetching water can be very time-consuming in some poor rural environments);
- reduced effort;
- reduced strain (carrying heavy weights on the head every day for years puts strain on the body, particularly the vertebral column);
- increased water availability, with benefits for health and perhaps even enabling vegetables to be grown;
- hygienic storage due to the sealed lid on the roller.

== Critiques ==
This is not a solution that meets the criteria of Sustainable Development Goal (SDG) 6. "Safely managed drinking water services" (SMDWS), which is the global indicator for estimating progress toward the SDG for safe drinking water for all (SDG 6.1). Global use of SMDWS is estimated by the Joint Monitoring Programme (JMP) using data on four subcomponents which measure whether households use a primary drinking water source that is (i) improved, (ii) accessible on premises (4), (iii) available when needed (5), and (iv) free of fecal and priority chemical contamination.

Women and girls are often the ones who spend time fetching water. Having piped water to the home instead of having to carry it, no matter the method, means that families have more time for school and other productive activities. It also means they have more water for cleaning themselves and their homes. Many studies show that water stored in the home without residual chlorination is unsafe to drink.

Many people who have to fetch water from a source outside their home do not live on even terrain. Rivers and springs have steep banks, meaning people would have to drag or push this heavy roller (194 pounds is the weight of 24 gallons of water) up steep, slippery, muddy slopes.

One of the draw-backs of the distribution is that the rollers cannot be stacked efficiently to save space; thus transport capacity is wasted. Using wheels to avoid carrying water on backs and heads is not a new idea. Wheelbarrows and bikes can be used for water transport and other uses; the hippo roller cannot.

== Administration ==
The project is supported financially by donor funding which comes from individuals, corporate businesses and non-profit organization partners. Hippo Water International is a non-governmental organization in the United States created to raise funds there.

== Deployment ==
Around 46,000 Hippo rollers have been manufactured and distributed so far.

As part of the investigation into the alleviation of poverty and scarcity of water in the far northern parts of Namibia, the Social Sciences Division of the Multi-Disciplinary Research Centre at the University of Namibia, sponsored by UNICEF's Directorate of Rural Development bought 1000 rollers and distributed them into the community. Six months after the introduction they launched an evaluation on the success and performance of the rollers as well as the social impact of the roller on the lives of the recipients.

== See also ==
- Water crisis
- Rural development
- Frugal Innovation
