= Cryoextraction (medicine) =

Intracapsular cataract extraction using a cryoprobe

In ophthalmology, cryoextraction is a form of intracapsular cataract extraction in which a cryoextractor, a special type of cryoprobe, is used to freeze the crystalline lens and pull it intact from the eye. Dr. Charles Kelman is credited with pioneering this surgical method in 1962. It can also be used in the treatment of orbital tumors.
