= Moder humus =

Forest floor type

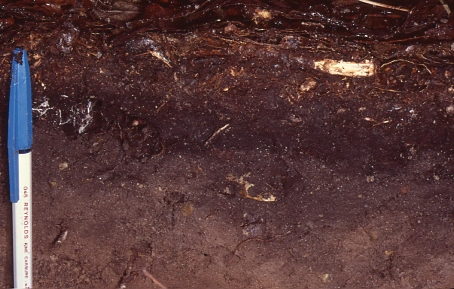
Moder humus profile in an oak forest

Moder is a forest floor type formed under coniferous forests, mixed-wood and pure deciduous forests. Moder is a kind of humus form whose properties are the transition between mor humus and mull humus types. Moder is similar to mor as it is made up of partially to fully humified organic components accumulated on the mineral soil, while compared to mull, moder is zoologically active. In addition, moder presents as in the middle of mor and mull with a higher decomposition capacity than mull but lower than mor. Moder is characterized by a slow rate of litter decomposition by litter-dwelling organisms and fungi, leading to the accumulation of organic residues, mainly in the form of invertebrate fecal pellets. Moder has been described by Franz Hartmann, midway between mull and mor and was previously described as 'insect mull'.

== Properties ==
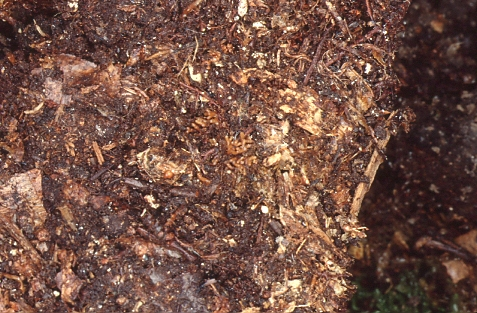
The OF layer in a moder humus profile from a Scots pine stand. Note the numerous digit-like mycrorrhizal root tips protruding upwards within the OF horizon

Moder develops in semiarid, temperate, and Mediterranean climates. Moder' chemical characteristics show high acidity (low pH), total carbon, carbon-nitrogen ratio, and low cation exchange capacity, total nitrogen and base saturation. Moder has a higher availability of nutrients than mor. Moder is the seat of intense biological activity in the forest floor, with a superficial development of the fine root system of trees, associated with a symbiotic ectomycorrhizal mycelium circulating between the accumulated animal faeces in which fungal hyphae penetrate to capture nutrients.

== Formation ==
Morder forms in deciduous forest situations when the soil has fewer bacteria and macro-invertebrates, such as earthworms, to decompose and bury the organic matter deposited on the soil surface, mainly because of high soil acidity and poor litter quality. The animals responsible for the fragmentation of litter and its transformation into humus belong to the detritivorous fauna, including microarthropods (e.g. springtails, oribatid mites), macroarthropods (e.g. millipedes, woodlice, insect larvae) but also molluscs (snails, slugs) and worms (epigeic earthworms, enchytraeids). The small vertical movements of epigeic worms and enchytraeids generate a thin A horizon, with a microgranular or particulate structure (depending on silty or sandy nature of the mineral substrate), with a diffuse transition with the overlying OH horizon.

== Diagnostic horizons ==
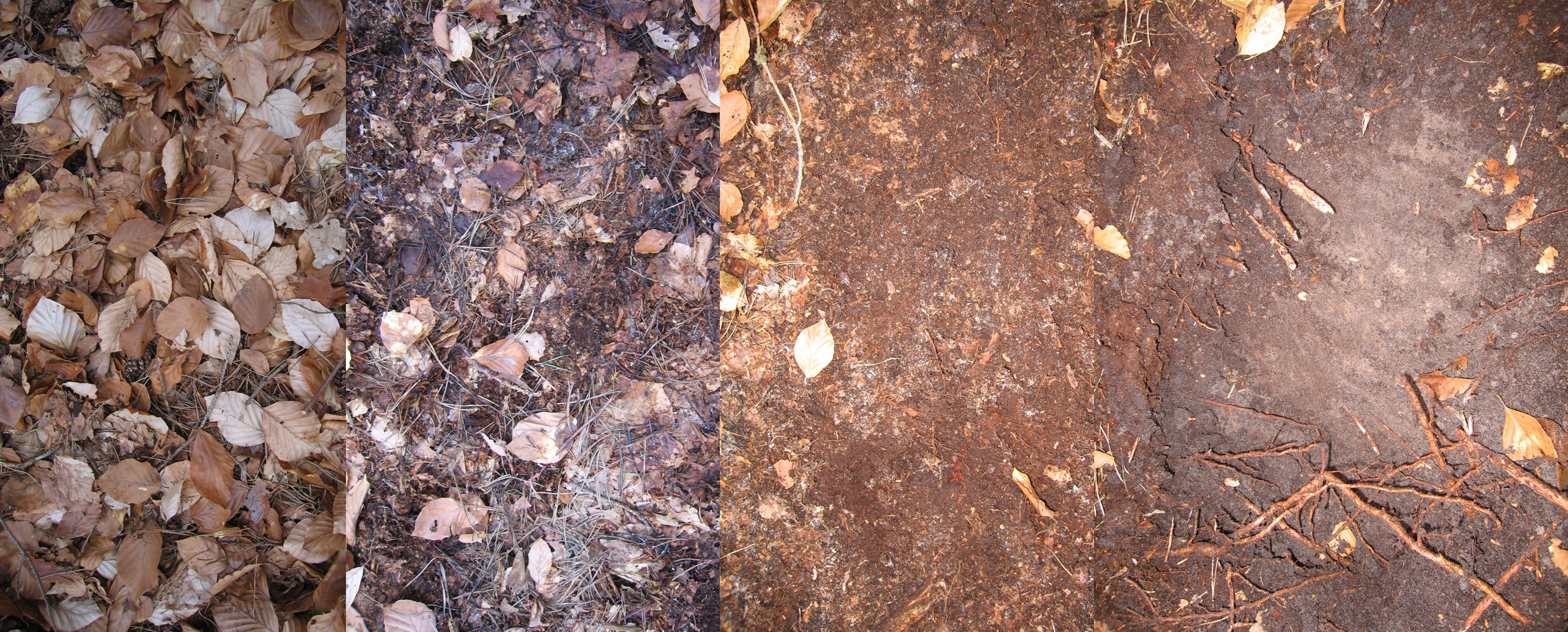
Succession of OL, OF, OH and A horizons in a moder humus from a beech forest: from left to right each picture is a top view of a horizon upon discarding the layer immediately above it

It is generally possible to observe four distinct horizons designated by OL, OF, OH and A.

- OL horizon: a horizon defined by accumulating leaves or needles, twigs, and woody materials, with the original structures still visible.
- OF horizon: a horizon defined by the buildup of partially decomposed organic matter generated primarily from leaves, twigs, and woody materials. Some of the original structures are difficult to identify, and materials may have been transformed into faeces by soil fauna.
- OH horizon: a horizon defined by the accumulation of disintegrated organic matter in which the original structures are undetectable. It differs from the OF horizon by a higher rate of humification due to the action of animals and microbes. It can partially merge into the underlying mineral soil, forming a thin A horizon.
- A horizon: a horizon defined by the accumulation of humified organic matter (humus) mixed (silt, clay) or juxtaposed (sand) with mineral particles. The A horizon of moder differs from that of mull and amphi by the size of peds, i.e. infra-millimetric animal faeces either purely organic when juxtaposed to sand particles or organo-mineral when finely mixed with silt or clay particles. This horizon results from the burrowing and mixing activity (bioturbation) of small invertebrates, mostly enchytraeids.

The OF horizon is used to distinguish moder. This layer is mostly made up of partially decomposed plant remains broken or comminuted by soil fauna and loosely organized rather than matted. However, an abundance of fine roots can sometimes result in a matted appearance. A distinctive aspect of the OF horizon and its loose nature is the abundance of soil animal droppings, which can be seen with the aid of a hand lens. Millipedes, springtails, oribatid mites, woodlice, and various insect larvae all excrete these droppings. The fragmentation of plant residues by soil fauna facilitates a faster rate of microbial decomposition. Bacteria, actinomycetes, and protozoa are progressively contributing to the breakdown process, although fungi play a more important role than other microorganisms in moder humus layers, at least to the exception of the A horizon.

== Classification ==
In the British Columbian classification of humus forms, Moder is subdivided in Velomoder, Xeromoder, Mormoder and Leptomoder for well-aerated (terrestrial) humus forms, and Mullmoder, Hydromoder and Histomoder for poorly aerated (semi-terrestrial) humus forms.

In the French classification of humus forms, Moder is subdivided in Hemimoder, Eumoder and Dysmoder.

In HUMUSICA, a worldwide classification of humus forms, Moder is considered as a humus system (abbreviation of humus interaction system) and subdivided in Hemimoder, Eumoder, and Dysmoder as humus forms. They exhibit the following morphological characteristics:

- Hemimoder: presence of a discontinous OH horizon and a gradual transition to a A horizon with a microgranular structure.
- Eumoder: presence of a continuous OH horizon < 1 cm and a gradual transition to a A horizon with a microgranular structure.
- Dysmoder: presence of a continuous OH horizon > 1 cm and a gradual transition to a A horizon with a microgranular structure.

The gradient of increasing contribution of organic layers to the humus profile, from Hemimoder to Dysmoder, has been included in a numerical scale covering all lowland terrestrial humus forms, called Humus Index. The Humus Index is an ordinal scale which can be rank correlated with other parameters measured on soil or vegetation, and thus can be used as an indicator of soil health or forest stand development. It has been shown to covary with soil fertility, forest management type and tree age, pollution level, and plant species richness.
