= Soil matrix =

Solid phase of soils

The soil matrix is the solid phase of soils, and comprise the solid particles that make up soils. Soil particles can be classified by their chemical composition (mineralogy) as well as their size. The particle-size distribution of a soil, its texture, determines many of the properties of that soil, in particular hydraulic conductivity and water potential, but the mineralogy of those particles can strongly modify those properties. The mineralogy of the finest soil particles, clay, is especially important.

== Gravel, sand and silt ==
Gravel, sand and silt are the larger soil particles, and their mineralogy is often inherited from the parent material of the soil, but may include products of weathering (such as concretions of calcium carbonate or iron oxide), or residues of plant and animal life (such as silica phytoliths). Quartz is the most common mineral in the sand or silt fraction as it is resistant to chemical weathering, except under hot climate; other common minerals are feldspars, micas and ferromagnesian minerals such as pyroxenes, amphiboles and olivines, which are dissolved or transformed in clay under the combined influence of physico-chemical and biological processes.

== Mineral colloids: soil clays ==
Due to its high specific surface area and its unbalanced negative electric charges, clay is the most active mineral component of soil. It is a colloidal and most often a crystalline phyllosilicate material. In soils, clay is a soil textural class and is defined in a physical sense as any mineral particle less than 2 μm (8×10^{−5} in) in effective diameter. Many soil minerals, such as gypsum, calcite, feldspar or quartz particles, are small enough to be classified as clay based on their physical size, but chemically they do not afford the same utility as do mineralogically defined clay minerals.

Before the advent of X-ray diffraction clay was thought to be very small particles of quartz, feldspar, mica, hornblende or augite, but it is now known to be (with the exception of mica-based clays) a precipitate with a mineralogical composition that is dependent on but different from its parent materials and is classed as a secondary mineral. The type of clay that is formed is a function of the parent material and the composition of the minerals in solution. Clay minerals continue to be formed as long as the soil exists, whether by inheritance, neoformation, or transformation of pre-existing minerals. Mica-based clays result from a modification of the primary mica mineral in such a way that it behaves and is classed as a clay. Most clays are crystalline, but some clays or some parts of clay minerals are amorphous. The clays of a soil are a mixture of the various types of clay, but one type often predominates according to soil type.

Typically there are four main groups of clay minerals: kaolinite, montmorillonite-smectite, illite, and chlorite. Most clays are crystalline and most are made up of three or four planes of oxygen held together by planes of aluminium and silicon by way of ionic bonds that together form a single layer of clay. The spatial arrangement of the oxygen atoms determines clay's structure. The layers of clay are sometimes held together through hydrogen bonds, sodium or potassium ionic bonds and as a result will swell less in the presence of water. Clays such as montmorillonite have layers that are loosely attached and will swell greatly when water intervenes between the layers.

In a wider sense clays can be classified as:

1. Layer Crystalline alumino-silica clays: montmorillonite, illite, vermiculite, chlorite, kaolinite.
2. Crystalline Chain carbonate and sulfate minerals: calcite (CaCO_{3}), dolomite (CaMg(CO_{3})_{2}) and gypsum (CaSO_{4}·2H2O).
3. Amorphous clays: young mixtures of silica (SiO_{2}-OH) and alumina (Al(OH)_{3}) which have not had time to form regular crystals.
4. Sesquioxide clays: old, highly leached clays which result in oxides of iron, aluminium and titanium.

=== Alumino-silica clays ===
Alumino-silica clays or aluminosilicate clays are characterized by their regular crystalline or quasi-crystalline structure. Oxygen in ionic bonds with silicon forms a tetrahedral coordination (silicon at the center) which in turn forms sheets of silica. Two sheets of silica are bonded together by a plane of aluminium which forms an octahedral coordination, called alumina, with the oxygens of the silica sheet above and that below it. Hydroxyl ions (OH^{−}) sometimes substitute for oxygen. During the clay formation process, Al^{3+} may substitute for Si^{4+} in the silica layer, and as much as one fourth of the aluminium Al^{3+} may be substituted by Zn^{2+}, Mg^{2+} or Fe^{2+} in the alumina layer. The substitution of lower-valence cations for higher-valence cations (isomorphous substitution) gives clay a local negative charge on an oxygen atom that attracts and holds water and positively charged soil cations, some of which are of value for plant growth. Isomorphous substitution occurs during the clay's formation and does not change with time.

- Montmorillonite clay is made of four planes of oxygen with two silicon and one central aluminium plane intervening. The aluminosilicate montmorillonite clay is thus said to have a 2:1 ratio of silicon to aluminium, in short it is called a 2:1 clay mineral. The seven planes together form a single crystal of montmorillonite. The crystals are weakly held together and water may intervene, causing the clay to swell up to ten times its dry volume. It occurs in soils which have had little leaching, hence it is found in arid regions, although it may also occur in humid climates, depending on its mineralogical origin. As the crystals are not bonded face to face, the entire surface is exposed and available for surface reactions, hence it has a high cation exchange capacity (CEC).
- Illite is a 2:1 clay similar in structure to montmorillonite but has potassium bridges between the faces of the clay crystals and the degree of swelling depends on the degree of weathering of potassium-feldspar. The active surface area is reduced due to the potassium ionic bonds. Illite originates from the modification of mica, a primary mineral. It is often found together with montmorillonite and its primary minerals. It has moderate CEC.
- Vermiculite is a mica-based clay similar to illite, but the crystals of clay are held together more loosely by hydrated magnesium and it will swell, but not as much as does montmorillonite. It has very high CEC.
- Chlorite is similar to vermiculite, but the loose bonding by occasional hydrated magnesium, as in vermiculite, is replaced by a hydrated magnesium sheet, that firmly bonds the planes above and below it. It has two planes of silicon, one of aluminium and one of magnesium; hence it is a 2:2 clay. Chlorite does not swell and it has low CEC.
- Kaolinite is a very common, highly weathered clay, and more common than montmorillonite in acid soils. It has one silica and one alumina plane per crystal; hence it is a 1:1 type clay. One plane of silica of montmorillonite is dissolved and is replaced with hydroxyls, which produces strong hydrogen bonds to the oxygen in the next crystal of clay. As a result, kaolinite does not swell in water and has a low specific surface area, and as almost no isomorphous substitution has occurred it has a low CEC. Where rainfall is high, acid soils selectively leach more silica than alumina from the original clays, leaving kaolinite. Even heavier weathering results in sesquioxide clays.

=== Crystalline chain clays ===
The carbonate and sulfate clay minerals are much more soluble and hence are found primarily in desert soils where leaching is less active.

=== Amorphous clays ===
Amorphous clays are young, and commonly found in recent volcanic ash deposits such as tephra. They are mixtures of alumina and silica which have not formed the ordered crystal shape of alumino-silica clays which time would provide. The majority of their negative charges originates from hydroxyl ions, which can gain or lose a hydrogen ion (H^{+}) in response to soil pH, in such way as to buffer the soil pH. They may have either a negative charge provided by the attached hydroxyl ion (OH^{−}), which can attract a cation, or lose the hydrogen of the hydroxyl to solution and display a positive charge which can attract anions. As a result, they may display either high CEC in an acid soil solution, or high anion exchange capacity in a basic soil solution.

=== Sesquioxide clays ===
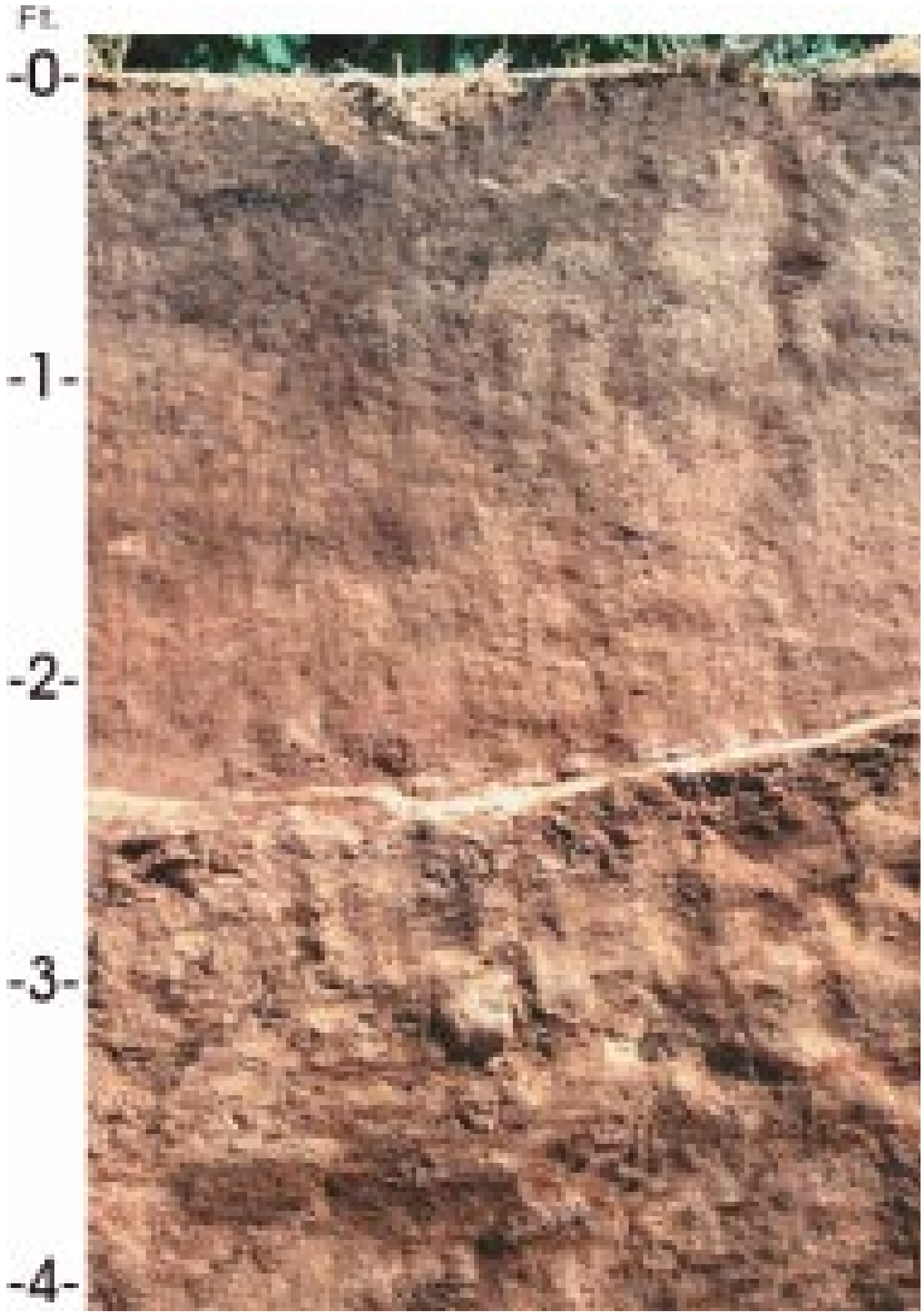
silica-sesquioxide

Sesquioxide clays or sesquioxides are a product of heavy rainfall that has leached most of the silica from alumino-silica clay, leaving the less soluble oxides iron hematite (Fe_{2}O_{3}), iron hydroxide (Fe(OH)_{3}), aluminium hydroxide gibbsite (Al(OH)_{3}), hydrated manganese birnessite (MnO_{2}), as can be observed in most lateritic weathering profiles of tropical soils. It takes hundreds of thousands of years of leaching to create sesquioxide clays. Sesqui is Latin for "one and one-half": there are three parts oxygen to two parts iron or aluminium; hence the ratio is one and one-half (not true for all). They are hydrated and act as either amorphous or crystalline. They are not sticky and do not swell, and soils high in them (e.g. lateritic soils) behave much like sand and can rapidly pass water. They are able to hold large quantities of phosphates, a sorptive process which can at least partly be inhibited in the presence of decomposed (humified) organic matter. Sesquioxides have low CEC but these variable-charge minerals are able to hold anions as well as cations. Such soils range from yellow to red in colour according to the dominance of various iron oxides. Such clays tend to hold phosphorus so tightly that it is unavailable for absorption by plants, in proportion to their content in goethite.

== Organic colloids ==
Humus is one of the two final stages of decomposition of organic matter. It remains in the soil as the organic component of the soil matrix while the other stage, carbon dioxide, issuing from the mineralization of carbonaceous compounds, is freely liberated in the atmosphere or reacts with calcium to form the soluble calcium bicarbonate or precipitates as calcium carbonate according to pH. While humus may linger for a thousand years, on the larger scale of the age of the mineral soil components, it is temporary, being finally released as CO_{2}. It is composed of the very stable lignins (30%) and complex sugars (polyuronides, 30%), proteins (30%), waxes, and fats that are resistant to breakdown by microbes and can form complexes with metals, facilitating their downward migration (podzolization). However, although originating for its main part from dead plant organs (wood, bark, foliage, roots), a large part of humus comes from organic compounds excreted by soil organisms (roots, microbes, animals) and from their decomposition upon death. Its chemical assay is 60% carbon, 2% nitrogen, some oxygen and the remainder hydrogen, sulfur, calcium, potassium, magnesium and phosphorus. On a dry weight basis, the CEC of humus is many times greater than that of clay.

Humus plays a major role in the regulation of atmospheric carbon, through carbon sequestration in the soil profile, more especially in deeper horizons with reduced biological activity. Stocking and destocking of soil carbon are under strong climate influence. They are normally balanced through an equilibrium between production and mineralization of organic matter, but the balance is in favour of destocking under present-day climate warming, and more especially in permafrost.

== Carbon and terra preta ==
In the extreme environment of high temperatures and the leaching caused by the heavy rain of tropical rain forests, the clay and organic colloids are largely destroyed. The heavy rains wash the alumino-silicate clays from the soil leaving only sesquioxide clays of low CEC. The high temperatures and humidity allow bacteria and fungi to virtually decay any organic matter on the rain-forest floor overnight and much of the nutrients are volatilized or leached from the soil and lost, leaving only a thin root mat lying directly on the mineral soil. However, carbon in the form of finely divided charcoal, also known as black carbon, is far more stable than soil colloids and is capable of performing many of the functions of the soil colloids of sub-tropical soils. Soil containing substantial quantities of charcoal, of an anthropogenic origin, is called terra preta. In Amazonia it testifies for the agronomic knowledge of past Amerindian civilizations. The pantropical peregrine earthworm Pontoscolex corethrurus has been suspected to contribute to the fine division of charcoal and its mixing to the mineral soil in the frame of present-day slash-and-burn or shifting cultivation still practiced by Amerindian tribes. Research into terra preta is still young but is promising. Fallow periods "on the Amazonian Dark Earths can be as short as 6 months, whereas fallow periods on oxisols are usually 8 to 10 years long" The incorporation of charcoal to agricultural soil for improving water and nutrient retention has been called biochar, being extended to other charred or carbon-rich by-products, and is now increasingly used in sustainable tropical agriculture. Biochar also allows the irreversible sorption of pesticides and other pollutants, a mechanism by which their mobility, and thus their environmental risk, decreases. It has also been argued as a mean of sequestering more carbon in the soil, thereby mitigating the so-called greenhouse effect. However, the use of biochar is limited by the availability of wood or other products of pyrolysis and by risks caused by concomitent deforestation.

== See also ==
- Physical properties of soil

== Bibliography ==
- Donahue, Roy Luther; Miller, Raymond W.; Shickluna, John C. (1977). Soils: an introduction to soils and plant growth (4th ed.). Englewood Cliffs, New Jersey: Prentice-Hall. ISBN 978-0138219185.
- "Arizona Master Gardener Manual". Arizona Cooperative Extension, College of Agriculture, University of Arizona.
- Stefferud, Alfred (1957). Soil: The Yearbook of Agriculture 1957 (PDF). United States Department of Agriculture. OCLC 704186906.
