= Humus form =

Arrangement of organic and mineral layers in soil

Humus form is the features of the topsoil and plant litter in a biome, such as mull humus form in deciduous forest or mor humus form in coniferous forest. Dead organic matter, such as leaves, decomposes into humus. Sometimes soil animals mix underlying mineral soil with the humus. This is also part of the humus form.

Humus form is important in ecosystem management, such as forest management, as it influences a forest's ability to regenerate through the establishment of new saplings and seedlings. Humus form is affected by land use, vegetation dynamics, pollution, and climate change.

== Terrestrial humus forms ==
Terrestrial humus forms are found in forests, woodlands, grasslands, heathlands, steppes, tundras, deserts and semi-deserts. Five humus systems have been described in terrestrial environments: mull, moder, mor, amphi, and tangel. They all have pore spaces filled with air, where soil organisms live, at least temporarily.

=== Mull ===
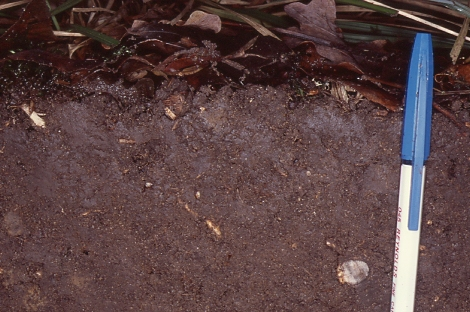
Mull humus profile in an oak forest

Mull is the product of the mixing activity of burrowing soil animals (such as earthworms, ants, termites, moles, pocket gophers) which create nests and burrows within the soil biomantle. These disturbances mix organic matter with mineral particles, aerate soil, create and modify ecological niches of all other soil organisms, from microbes to plant roots and passing by invertebrates. Some mull-forming animal groups (such as earthworms, millipedes, termites, crane fly larvae) ingest soil and mix it with mucus in their gut, or mix it with their saliva to create nests and tunnels (termites). All these disturbances, whether mechanical or biochemical, stimulate microbial activity, hence faster nutrient cycles and better mineral uptake at root level. Thus mull is associated with more fertile soils and productive ecosystems, with a positive aboveground-belowground feedback process: more nutrients for plants, thus better plant growth and more nutrients in plant remains, higher quality of soil organic matter, thus better growth and reproduction of soil animals and microorganisms, with a lesser immobilization of nutrients in microbial biomass, and so on. Mull is linked to favorable environmental conditions, more particularly good litter quality, mild climate and availability of weatherable minerals in the parent rock.

=== Moder ===
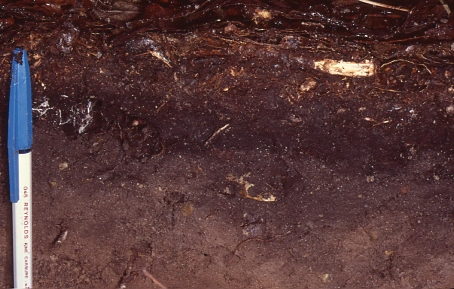
Moder humus profile in an oak forest

Moder is the product of the activity of non-burrowing animals, or those only burrowing over a very short distance. These are mainly active in the litter, which they transform into dark-colored excrement, visible in the form of millimeter-sized fecal pellets or, for the smallest (< 100 microns), a fine reddish-brown powder. The animals responsible for the fragmentation of litter and its transformation into humus belong to the detritivorous fauna, including microarthropods (e.g. springtails, oribatid mites), macroarthropods (e.g. millipedes, woodlice, insect larvae) but also molluscs (snails, slugs) and worms (epigeic earthworms, enchytraeids). Litter fragmentation and deposition of organic excrement generate an OF horizon which is gradually transformed into an OH horizon as animal excrement accumulates. The small vertical movements of epigeic worms and enchytraeids generate a thin A horizon, with a microgranular or particulate structure (depending on silty or sandy nature of the mineral substrate), with a diffuse transition with the overlying OH horizon. Although the OH horizon is considered a diagnostic horizon for moder (as opposed to mull) it is the intense biological activity within the OF horizon which truly marks the moder. In addition to the detritivorous fauna, and predators associated with it, the moder OF horizon is permeated by the fine (assimilatory) root system of trees, notably conifers (e.g. pine, spruce) and hardwoods with recalcitrant litter (e.g. oak, beech), and the ectomycorrhizal system generally associated with it. Microscopic observation of moder OF horizon shows that ectomycorrhizal fungal hyphae penetrate the excreta of detritivorous fauna, thus creating a functional link between soil fauna and plants. Moder is generally associated with environments where nutrient cycles are slowed down, either due to cold climate (high altitude or latitude), low availability of weatherable minerals in the parent rock, or because of acidifying vegetation (e.g. conifers).

=== Mor ===
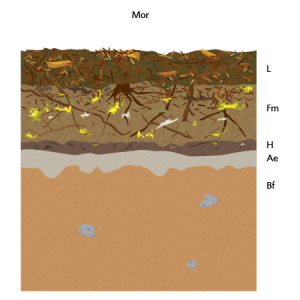
Horizon levels of Mor humus and the soil below

Mor is the product of a slow evolution of organic matter in the absence of significant faunal activity. The absence of OF and OH horizons as defined below and the presence of an abrupt transition with the underlying mineral horizons distinguish mor from other terrestrial humus forms. However, there is considerable confusion in distinguishing mor from moder humus forms with very thick O horizons but intense activity of soil fauna, particularly enchytraeids. The notion of 'raw humus' has long prevailed in pedology, making it difficult or even impossible to separate mor from moder when the litter is very thick, without taking into account faunal activity. In mor humus, litter fragmentation results mainly from physical processes, such as freeze-thaw cycles, and microbial processes, particularly fungal activity. It has been demonstrated that nitrogen transfer occurs directly from slowly decomposing plant remains to vegetation, via the mycelium of ectomycorrhizal and ericoid fungi, in relation to the exploratory capacity of mycelia, at its maximum in mor. Mor is associated with very cold climates, high altitude and latitude, or with very acidifying vegetation as in certain coniferous forests (notably pine) or in ericaceous heath, or even in highly polluted soils. More generally mor is associated with ecological factors that strongly reduce the activity of soil organisms, whether animal or microbial.

=== Amphi ===
Amphi, also called 'twin mull', 'amphimull', 'mull-moder', or 'xeromoder', combines the characteristics of mull and moder, with the presence of OF and OH horizons (typical of moder) and an A horizon with a granular structure (typical of mull) resulting from the seasonal activity of earthworms. The meaning of "Amphi" closely relates to duality and encompasses two environments or sides, as seen in words like "amphibian" (living in water and on land) and "amphitheatre" (a space surrounded). Using the term to identify a humus form emphasizes existence or action "on both sides" or "in two manners". This form of humus, undoubtedly more common than it appears in view of the numerous studies restricted to the classical division into mull, moder and mor, is found in environments with strong seasonal contrasts, of or mountain type. Activities by depth peak at different times of the year in the amphi humus form, more so than in the other humus forms. In Mediterranean environments, summer drought forces earthworms to burrow more deeply. In mountain environments, winter frost plays a similar role. The amphi demonstrates that the sole observation of the thickness of litter layers is not sufficient to characterize the humus form; it must always be complemented with the observation of the structure of the underlying mineral horizon. This humus form deserves to be studied more widely, particularly in the context of the effects of climate warming, because it contains two juxtaposed carbon sinks and perhaps constitutes the form of humus with the best carbon storage potential.

=== Tangel ===
Tangel is found in mountain environments, on hard limestone or dolomitic substrates, in cold and humid climates, and is characterized by a strong accumulation of organic matter, the Kubiëna's 'tangel layer', that can reach up to 1 m thickness, resting on the parent rock, without an A horizon or with a weakly developed A horizon. Tangel and mor constitute two pathways for the evolution of organic matter in cold and humid mountain climates but on alkaline substrates for the former and acidic for the latter. Biological activity, both faunal and microbial, within tangel profiles is still poorly understood because it has been too little studied. However, a study carried out in the northern Alps shows a decrease in microbial activity with depth, in relation to a fall in the abundance of fungi and bacteria, despite increase in abundance of archaea, without any clear hypothesis being formulated as to the possible causal relationships between biological activity and accumulation of organic matter. The probable presence of earthworm activity has been noted by some authors based on the observation of a granular structure within the accumulated organic but sampling of the soil fauna remains to be carried out.

== Semi-terrestrial humus forms ==
The humus forms present in peat bogs and marshes, due to their great variety, are subject to complex classifications, taking into account the stage of evolution towards terrestrial forms, depending on depth of the water table, its variations during the year and the nature of the dominant vegetation (sphagnum or herbaceous plants). For more information, the reader is referred to specialized articles describing diagnostic horizons and humus forms.

== Definitions ==
Virtual Soil Science Learning Resources group: "Humus forms are made of soil horizons located at or near the surface, which have formed from organic residues (separate from or mixed with mineral particles). Horizons that may comprise a humus form include L, F, H, and Ah, but not B or C."

German Soil Science Society: "Humus form is an order of distinct units defined by organic surface horizons and the first mineral horizon with similar morphology, depths and type of boundary of horizons indicating specific conditions for bioturbation, decomposition, humification, and mineralisation."

Canadian Ministry of Forests (British Columbia): "The humus form is defined as a group of soil horizons located at or near the surface of a pedon, which have formed from organic residues, either separate from, or intermixed with mineral materials."

== History ==
Early contributions to the knowledge of humus forms were made by Peter Erasmus Müller, a Danish forester. In his seminal contribution Studier over Skovjord: som bidrag til skovdyrkningens theori, later translated into German and French, Müller described muld (later germanized as mull) and mor, two modes of assemblage of organic and mineral matter, which he associated to two opposite classes of high and low productivity and soil fertility of Danish beechwoods. His investigations embraced a thorough analysis of plant communities, and chemical as well as microscopic investigations in various soil horizons. Enrico Mylius Dalgas also contributed. At the same time Charles Darwin, one year before he died, published a detailed study of the formation of mull (called by him mould, reminiscent of the Danish muld). Moder was later added as a third forest humus form by Franz Hartmann, midway between mull and mor and previously described as 'insect mull' by Müller.

== Classification ==
Most classifications of humus are national (French, Belgian, German, Canadian, Russian, among many others) and do not embrace the variety of humus forms found over all world biomes, being mostly focused on forest soils and temperate climates. However HUMUSICA, a worldwide morpho-functional classification of humus forms, was created in the 2010s. HUMUSICA describes and classifies humus forms from a wide array of terrestrial, semi-aquatic, cultivated and man-made environments. In HUMUSICA the three current humus forms called mull, moder and mor are considered as humus systems, abbreviation of humus interaction systems, each embracing several humus forms according to variations in thickness of organic and mineral-organic horizons.

Humus profiles, like soil profiles, refer to a trench through the soil. Humipedons, like pedons, refer to a column of soil. For the sake of clarity they will be synonymized, because both are made of successive layers the age of which increases with depth, more superficial layers being younger than deeper ones because organic matter is mostly deposited from above. One of the key principles of humus form classifications is that humus profiles (humipedons) may evolve at a different rate from soil profiles (pedons). Given the prominent part taken by soil organisms, from bacteria to mammals, passing by plants and invertebrates, in the spatial arrangement and transformation of organic matter, humipedons display pluri-annual variations, while pedon changes take decades to centuries. However, Walter Kubiëna considered that there was a parallelism between humus forms and soil types, hence his common classification of humus and soil profiles, an opinion not shared by the majority of soil scientists who turned to soil classifications based on physical and chemical properties of more stable underlying mineral horizons, like USDA's Soil Taxonomy and FAO's World Reference Base for Soil Resources (WRB). It has been suggested that the pedon could be subdivided in three parts, called humipedon (for the humus profile), copedon and lithopedon, in a decreasing order of contribution of soil biological activity to their formation, and thus of their cycle of change, from decade to millennium.

== Diagnostic horizons ==
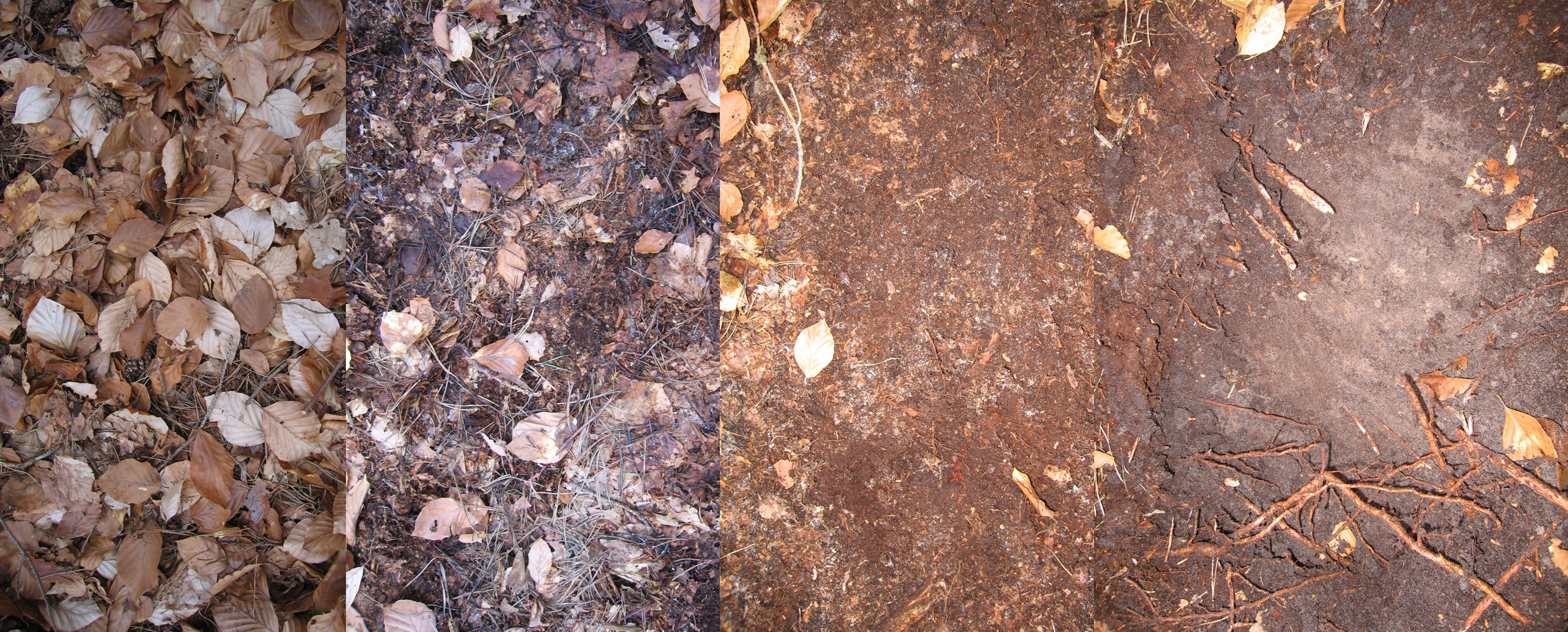
Succession of OL, OF, OH and A horizons in a moder humus from a beech forest: from left to right each picture is a top view of a horizon upon discarding the layer immediately above it

Humipedons display a succession of horizons according to decomposition stages of fallen plant litter and its progressive incorporation to mineral matter. They have been characterized on thin soil sections by soil micromorphologists, but their recognition in the field is easy, being aided by the use of a hand lens if necessary. They can be observed along a humus profile cut with a sharp knife along a trench or be successively collected by hand one by one from the top to the bottom of a small soil monolith.

=== OL horizon ===
The OL horizon (Oi in the USDA Soil Taxonomy) is made of recognizable leaves or needles without any prominent signs of fragmentation by litter-consuming soil animals. Its colour is currently brown to black according to microbial successions taking place during the first stages of litter decomposition. Bleaching of litter may also occur when leaves or needles are colonized by white-rot fungi. The OL horizon is often seen permeated by fungal mycelia which penetrate leaves and needles and participate to their decomposition. The OL horizon is present in all terrestrial humus forms, to the exception of the most active mull humus forms (e.g. Eumull) where it might be seasonally absent because of a fast decomposition rate of recently fallen litter.

=== OF horizon ===
The OF horizon (Oe in the USDA Soil Taxonomy) is made of fragmented leaf or needle litter, from the feeding activity of soil animals (macrofauna and mesofauna). Litter debris are mixed with feces deposited by litter-consuming animals in the form of dark-coloured pellets of a size varying from 30-50 micrometres (enchytraeids, oribatid mites, springtails) to 1-2 millimetres (epigeic earthworms, millipedes, woodlice, molluscs). Enchytraeid faeces are so small that they appear as a very fine black powder covering or intermingled between decaying leaves. In coniferous forests enchytraeids and some oribatid mites penetrate fallen needles once these have been heavily colonized by fungi and they deposit their feces at the inside, making them invisible if needles are not dissected by the observer. In thick forest floors with active animal activity (e.g. moder humus forms) OF horizons are the seat of maximum development of the fine root system of trees and mycelia of their ectomycorrhizal fungal associates.

=== OH horizon ===
The OH horizon (Oa in the USDA Soil Taxonomy) is the product of transformation of plant remains by soil organisms once these remains are no longer visible, but the humus thus formed is still not incorporated with mineral matter. According to the soil animals which contributed the most to the faunal activity observed in the overlying OF horizon, the OH horizon may be seen as an accumulation of still visible fecal pellets (e.g. earthworms, ants, millipedes, woodlice, crane fly larvae for macrofauna, but also oribatid mites for mesofauna) or in the case of enchytraeids as a fine powder further compacted in depth. By their vertical movements enchytraeids play a decisive role in the transition with the underlying A horizon. Fine root systems are also present in OH horizons, together with subterranean organs of heathland plants (e.g. Ericaceae) and their symbiotic fungal associates (ericoid mycorrhizae) which are able to decompose recalcitrant organic matter and transfer its nitrogen to the host plant.

=== A horizon ===
The A horizon results from the mixing of organic matter with mineral matter, mostly effected by burrowing soil animals (e.g. enchytraeids, earthworms, termites, ants, darkling beetles, gophers). Some physical processes may also contribute to the mixing of organic matter with mineral matter, such as shrink-swell cycles of vertisols. The A horizon is mainly made of mineral-organic aggregates (peds) of varying size, depending on the size of soil animals which excreted or moulded them in the course of their burrowing activity. Macroaggregates (> 250 μm) are built by macrofauna (e.g. earthworms, ants, termites) and megafauna (e.g. gophers), while microaggregates (< 250 μm) are built by mesofauna (e.g. enchytraeids, microarthropods). Plant roots and Microorganisms (bacteria, fungi) also contribute to the formation and stabilization of aggregates through their excreta (e.g. microbial extracellular polysaccharides, root mucilages).

=== E horizon ===
The E horizon appears as a white or grey (ashy) horizon, the lightness (Munsell colour value) of which varies with its carbon content, always feeble. Compared to the abovelying organic and mineral-organic horizons, the E horizon displays only poor signs of biological activity, being mainly the seat of leaching of water, solutes (e.g. nitrates, dissolved organic carbon) and colloids (e.g. clay, humus) through a mineral layer. Whether the E horizon is the main seat of mineral weathering, as suggested by the observation of pore networks of fungal origin within weathered minerals, is still a matter of conjecture because highly weathered minerals are present in the E horizon. This suggests that mineral weathering mainly takes place in the overlying A horizon permeated by plant roots and their microbial rhizosphere associates. Like the OH horizon can be considered as the end-product of biological activity taking place in the above A horizon, the E horizon could be the end-product of biochemical processes of mineral weathering taking place in the above A horizon.

== Humus forms in a changing world ==
A key principle in the classification of humus forms is that humus profiles (humipedons) can evolve at a different rate than soil profiles (pedons). Given the predominant role of soil organisms, from bacteria to mammals, plants, and invertebrates, in the spatial organization and transformation of organic matter, humipedons exhibit pluri-annual variations, while the evolution of pedons takes decades or even centuries. Like any ecosystem, the humus form is likely to evolve under the influence of environmental changes, e.g. vegetation dynamics, land use, pollution or climate change.

=== Vegetation dynamics ===
The humus form evolves during plant successions. Several authors have highlighted an increase in the thickness of organic horizons, associated with an evolution from mull, in the initial forest stages, towards moder under mature forest stands. However, most of these studies concern plantations or natural woodlands after crop abandonment, the final stage studied being the age at which the trees are harvested before possible clear-cutting, a prelude to a new silvicultural rotation. In old, natural or semi-natural forests, where natural regeneration takes place freely, a cycle is observed where mull and moder alternate. This alternation is associated with earthworm population dynamics, which itself depends on access to nutrients via litter quality, at its optimum in grassy clearings where young seedlings are established, restricted when trees are actively growing (pole stage), and improving under adult and senescent trees, thus anticipating a new forest cycle by preparing the regeneration niche even before the trees die.

During forest conversion, from deciduous to coniferous or coniferous to deciduous stands, an evolution of humus forms in relation to the evolution of litter quality is observed: 'improving' litter (generally under deciduous trees) is associated with mull while 'acidifying' or 'recalcitrant' litter (generally under coniferous trees) is associated with moder or even mor. The conversion of coniferous forests into deciduous forests is accompanied by a transition from moder to mull, the opposite being observed in conifer plantations succeeding to deciduous stands. Similarly to conversion, the application of a calcium supply can promote the appearance of mull and better growth conditions for trees. However, in the presence of a biological phenomenon, it is not enough that the conditions for the existence of an organism are met for it to be present and active. If it is absent from the vicinity or has only weak dispersal capabilities, which is the case for earthworms and more generally for non-flying soil invertebrates, humus-form responses are observed that do not go in the expected direction. This is why attempts have been made to inoculate earthworms, in the presence or absence of mineral or organic fertilization, to facilitate the evolution of humus form from moder to mull, considered better in terms of forest site quality, during conversions or to improve forest productivity on acidic soils. The results are sometimes positive, sometimes negative if they do not take into account the requirements of soil organisms, particularly in cases of soil waterlogging (hydromorphy), to which earthworms are particularly sensitive.

The humus form is not only influenced by vegetation dynamics but is also, in some cases, a key player in this ecological process. Forest regeneration, that is, the ability of juvenile forms of trees (seedlings, seedlings) to establish themselves successfully, relies to a large extent on the humus form. When tree seedlings fail to develop their root system in deep litter, only mull is capable of ensuring a rapid contact of the young root, still non-mycorrhizal, with the mineral matter. This is what foresters achieve, by imitating the action of earthworms, when they recommend scarifying the soil to improve the regeneration of forest stands.

=== Land use ===
Land use influences the humus form via the nature of the vegetation (herbaceous, shrubby or tree-like) established under the influence of human activities such as agriculture, forestry or pastoralism, but also via the modifications resulting from soil work (ploughing, stubble cultivation) or inputs (fertilizers, pesticides). In permanent grasslands on fertile and well-aerated soils the most common humus form is mull, in its most active form, with an absence of an OL horizon and a A horizon permeated by the endomycorrhizal roots of herbaceous plants. Cultural practices modify this basic humus form by acting on the soil structure by removing the main burrowing groups such as earthworms and enchytraeids. Organic farming, by promoting organic amendment and eliminating chemical fertilizers and synthetic pesticides, and conservation agriculture, by eliminating or greatly reducing ploughing, encourages the activity of earthworms and therefore the development of a humus form similar to the mull of meadows, pastures and deciduous forests, called agri-mull or agro-mull. If cultural practices (ploughing, fertilizers, pesticides) are detrimental to earthworms but remain at a low level of impact on wildlife (integrated farming), the typical granular structure of mull is replaced by a microgranular (flaky) structure produced by enchytraeids and reminiscent of what is observed in the A horizon of the moder.

=== Pollution ===
Soil pollution, whether from atmospheric sulfur or nitrogen deposits, heavy metals, or organic compounds (hydrocarbons, persistent organic pollutants, etc.), impoverishes soil fauna and microflora when the pollution level reaches the tolerance threshold of soil organisms. Consequently, when keystone species are affected, such as soil engineers (earthworms, termites, ants, enchytraeids, etc.), organic matter decomposes more slowly, bioturbation is reduced, and the humus form evolves toward mor. The abnormal appearance of mor in a terrain otherwise conducive to the genesis of mull, moder, or amphi, constitutes a specific indication of reduced biological functions of the soil ecosystem. In this case, observing the humus form constitutes an inexpensive means of early detection and mapping of pollution at a large number of points before implementing more in-depth contamination assessment.

=== Climate change ===
Climate change significantly affects humus forms through multiple interconnected mechanisms that alter the balance between organic matter inputs and decomposition rates. Rising temperatures accelerate microbial decomposition processes, resulting in humus depletion and a negative carbon balance in many soils. Research in alpine grasslands demonstrates that a 3 °C temperature increase reduces soil humus content and destabilizes soil structure. The impacts are complex and vary depending on the specific humus form and environmental conditions. Climate warming drives predictable shifts between humus forms along temperature gradients. Research in France demonstrates that the change from moder towards mull occurs from north to south following increasing temperature gradients.

The effects of current global warming on humus form are still understudied and some hindsight is needed before drawing definitive conclusions on the current evolution. However, potential evolutions can be discerned through the study of altitudinal and latitudinal transects. Statistically, the warmer the temperature, the more mull is encountered at the expense of forms with lesser decomposition and incorporation of organic matter (e.g. moder, more, tangel). This is mainly explained by the general sensitivity of the activity of soil organisms, whether animal or microbial, to temperature. However, it must be taken into account that soil organisms, with their limited dispersal capabilities, are, for the most part, unable to track too rapid a change in climate, particularly with latitude where the distances to be covered for the same thermal gap are a thousand times greater than with altitude. Habitat fragmentation is another obstacle to the free dispersal of soil organisms, making any prediction based on distances alone difficult. Furthermore, disturbances (drought or flooding) accompanying climate warming can also counter the expected migration of soil engineers, such as earthworms, to warmer areas.

The expected change in humus form under climate warming also raises the question of the role of soil as a carbon source or sink. It was long believed that mull was not conducive to carbon sequestration due to the rapid decomposition of litter. In reality, in mull the litter does not accumulate on the surface but is quickly buried deep down, where it is bound to mineral matter in the form of organo-mineral assemblages that are more stable than the organic matter accumulated on the surface of mor and moder humus profiles. Mull therefore ultimately stores more carbon than moder or even mor forms. A shift from moder to mull, if confirmed, might ultimately allow the soil to store more carbon and therefore might mitigate the greenhouse effect.

== See also ==
- Marine sediment
