= Humus =

Organic matter in soils resulting from decay of plant and animal materials

Humus has a characteristic black or dark brown color and is an accumulation of organic carbon. Besides the three major soil horizons of (A) surface/topsoil, (B) subsoil, and (C) substratum, most soils have an organic horizon (O) on the very surface. Hard bedrock (R) is not in a strict sense soil.

Humus is the stable form of soil organic matter derived from decomposition of plant and animal substances. Humic layer or humus horizon is the organic matter above the topsoil and below leaf litter which is finely divided having a high surface area. This layer consists of a large proportion of humus. Humus can be found in many layers of the soil, but usually in the upper layers. Humus, which ranges in colour from brown to black, is largely composed of carbon, and contains high amounts of nitrogen, and smaller amounts of phosphorus and sulfur. Humus retains moisture in the topsoil, in particular in soils with a coarse texture (e.g. sand). Humus is the Latin word for "ground" or "earth".

Organisms which feed off the litter layer serve a key role in the formation of humus, known as humification. Earthworms are a major contributor to this process, alongside many other invertebrates, microbial processes, and fungi.

Only the decomposed organic matter in soil is considered humus, while the portion still in the process of decomposition is referred to as detritus. Since the respective stages of transformation are gradual, a precise distinction is not possible. Neither humus nor detritus is dead matter; both are heavily permeated by microorganisms such as soil bacteria and fungi.

In agriculture, "humus" sometimes also is used to describe mature or natural compost extracted from a woodland or other spontaneous source for use as a soil conditioner. It is also used to describe a topsoil horizon that contains organic matter (humus type, humus form, or humus profile). Humus has many nutrients that improve soil health, nitrogen and phosphorus being the most important. The ratio of carbon to nitrogen (C:N) of humus commonly ranges between 8:1 and 15:1 with the median being about 12:1. It also significantly improves (that is, decreases) the bulk density of soil. Humus is amorphous and lacks the cellular structure characteristic of organisms. The solid residue of biological wastewater treatment is also called humus. When not found to be contaminated by pathogens, toxic heavy metals, or persistent organic pollutants according to standard tolerance levels, it is sometimes composted and used as a soil amendment.

== Description ==
The primary materials involved in the process of humification are plant detritus, dead animals and microbes (necromass), excreta of all soil organisms, and also black carbon resulting from past fires. The composition of humus varies with that of primary (plant) materials and secondary microbial and animal products. The decomposition rate of the different compounds will affect the composition of the humus.

=== Types ===
Mor humus soil occurs when decomposition is slow, with a thick layer of Litter and Detritus above the Humus layer which has little or no mixing to the underlying mineral soil leaving a clearly visible boundary. Mor humus most often occurs on well drained and acidic soils, usually under conifer woodland and heathland. Many macroscopic organisms such as Lumbricus Terrestris cannot survive in such acid conditions, the lack of activity from such organisms mean the boundary between the mineral soil and the humus remains undisturbed.

In low acidity soil such as calcareous soils, the activity of these earthworms establish a mixture of the humus and the underlying mineral soil known as Mull humus. Mull humus is commonly found in deciduous woodland and lowland grassland, where the decomposition of the litter layer to humus is quite rapid, leaving a minimal or non-present detritus layer.

Moder is a transitional form of humus between mull and mor.

=== Horizons ===
Humus has a characteristic black or dark brown color and is organic due to an accumulation of organic carbon. Soil scientists use the capital letters O, A, B, C, and E to identify the master soil horizons, and lowercase letters for distinctions of these horizons. Most soils have three major horizons: the surface horizon (A), the subsoil (B), and the substratum (C). Most soils have an organic horizon (O) on the surface, but this horizon can also be buried. The master horizon (E) is used for subsurface horizons that have significantly lost minerals (eluviation). Bedrock, which is not soil, uses the letter R. The richness of soil horizons in humus determines their more or less dark color, generally decreasing from O to E, to the exception of deep horizons of podzolic soils enriched with colloidal humic substances which have been leached down the soil profile.

=== Composition ===
It is difficult to define humus precisely because it is a very complex substance which is still not fully understood. According to the classical conception of Selman Waksman, long-time reported in most textbooks of soil science, humus is different from decomposing soil organic matter. The latter looks rough and has visible remains of the original plant, animal or microbial matter, while fully humified humus, on the contrary, is amorphous and has a uniformly dark, spongy, and jelly-like appearance. However, when examined under a light microscope, humus may reveal tiny plant, animal, and microbial remains that have been mechanically, but not chemically, degraded. This suggests an ambiguous boundary between humus and soil organic matter, leading some authors to contest the use of the term humus and derived terms such as humic substances or humification, proposing the Soil Continuum Model (SCM). However, humus can be considered as having distinct properties, mostly linked to its richness in functional groups, justifying its maintenance as a specific term.

Fully formed humus is essentially a collection of very large and complex molecules formed in part from lignin and other polyphenolic molecules of the original plant material (foliage, wood, bark), in part from similar molecules that have been produced by microbes. During decomposition processes these polyphenols are modified chemically so that they are able to join up with one another to form very large molecules. Some parts of these molecules are modified in such a way that protein molecules, amino acids, and amino sugars are able to attach themselves to the polyphenol "base" molecule. As protein contains both nitrogen and sulfur, this attachment gives humus a moderate content of these two important plant nutrients.

Radiocarbon and other dating techniques have shown that the polyphenolic base of humus (mostly lignin and black carbon) can be very old, but the protein and carbohydrate attachments much younger, while to the light of modern concepts and methods the situation appears much more complex and unpredictable than previously thought. It seems that microbes are able to pull protein off humus molecules rather more readily than they are able to break the polyphenolic base molecule itself. As protein is removed its place may be taken by younger protein, or this younger protein may attach itself to another part of the humus molecule.

There is little data available on the composition of humus because it is a complex mixture that is challenging for researchers to analyze. Researchers in the 1940s and 1960s tried using chemical separation to analyze plant and humic compounds in forest and agricultural soils, but this proved impossible because extractants interacted with the analysed organic matter and created many artefacts. Further research has been done in more recent years, though it remains an active field of study.

== Humification ==
Microorganisms decompose a large portion of the soil organic matter into inorganic minerals that the roots of plants can absorb as nutrients. This process is termed mineralization. In this process, nitrogen (nitrogen cycle) and the other nutrients (nutrient cycle) in the decomposed organic matter are recycled. Depending on the conditions in which the decomposition occurs, a fraction of the organic matter does not mineralize and instead is transformed by a process called humification. Prior to modern analytical methods, early evidence led scientists to believe that humification resulted in concatenations of organic polymers resistant to the action of microorganisms, however recent research has demonstrated that microorganisms are capable of digesting humic substances in Redox reactions.

Humification can occur naturally in soil or artificially in the production of compost. Organic matter is humified by a combination of saprotrophic fungi, bacteria, microbes and animals such as earthworms, nematodes, protozoa, and arthropods (see Soil biology and Soil animals). Plant remains, including those that animals digested and excreted, contain organic compounds: sugars, starches, proteins, carbohydrates, lignins, waxes, resins, and organic acids. Decay in the soil begins with the decomposition of sugars and starches from carbohydrates, which decompose easily as detritivores initially invade the dead plant organs, while the remaining cellulose and lignin decompose more slowly. Simple proteins, organic acids, starches, and sugars decompose rapidly, while crude proteins, fats, waxes, and resins remain relatively unchanged for longer periods of time.

Lignin, which is quickly transformed by white-rot fungi, is one of the primary precursors of humus, together with by-products of microbial and animal activity. The humus produced by humification is thus a mixture of compounds and complex biological chemicals of plant, animal, and microbial origin that has many functions and benefits in soil. Some judge earthworm humus (vermicompost) to be the optimal organic manure.

== Stability ==
Much of the humus in most soils has persisted for more than 100 years, rather than having been decomposed into CO_{2}, and can be regarded as stable; this organic matter has been protected from decomposition by microbial or enzyme action because it is hidden (occluded) inside small aggregates of soil particles, or tightly sorbed or complexed to clays. Most humus that is not protected in this way is decomposed within 10 years and can be regarded as less stable or more labile. The mixing activity of soil-consuming invertebrates (e.g. earthworms, termites, some millipedes) contribute to the stability of humus by favouring the formation of mineral-organic complexes with clay minerals at the inside of their guts, hence more carbon sequestration in humus forms such as mull and amphi, with well-developed mineral-organic horizons, when compared with moder and mor where most organic matter accumulates at the soil surface.

Stable humus contributes few plant-available nutrients in soil, but it helps maintain its physical structure. A very stable form of humus is formed from the slow oxidation of soil carbon after the incorporation of finely powdered charcoal into the topsoil, suggested to result from the grinding and mixing activity of a tropical earthworm. This process is speculated to have been important in the formation of the unusually fertile Amazonian terra preta do Indio, also called Amazonian Dark Earths. However, some authors suggest that complex soil organic molecules may be much less stable than previously thought: "the available evidence does not support the formation of large-molecular-size and persistent 'humic substances' in soils. Instead, soil organic matter is a continuum of progressively decomposing organic compounds.″

== Benefits in agriculture ==
The importance of chemically stable humus is thought by some to be the fertility it provides to soils in both a physical and chemical sense, though some agricultural experts put a greater focus on other features of it, such as its ability to control diseases. It helps the soil retain moisture by increasing microporosity and encourages the formation of good soil structure. The incorporation of oxygen into large organic molecular assemblages generates many active, negatively charged sites that bind to positively charged ions (cations) of plant nutrients, making them more available to the plant by way of ion exchange. Humus allows soil organisms to feed and reproduce and is often described as the "life-force" of the soil.

The most useful functions of humus are in improving soil structure, all the more when associated with cations (e.g. calcium), and in providing a very large surface area that can hold nutrient elements until required by plants, an ion exchange function comparable to that of clay particles.

Soil carbon sequestration is a major property of the soil, also considered as an ecosystem service. Only when it becomes stable and acquires its multi-century permanence, mostly via multiple interactions with the soil matrix, should molecular soil humus be considered to be of significance in removing the atmosphere's current carbon dioxide overload.

- The process that converts soil organic matter into humus feeds the population of microorganisms and other creatures in the soil, and thus maintains high and healthy levels of soil life.
- The rate at which soil organic matter is converted into humus promotes (when fast, e.g. mull) or limits (when slow, e.g. mor) the coexistence of plants, animals, and microorganisms in the soil.
- "Effective humus" and "stable humus" are additional sources of nutrients for microbes: the former provides a readily available supply, and the latter acts as a long-term storage reservoir.
- Decomposition of dead plant material causes complex organic compounds to be slowly oxidized (lignin-like humus) or to decompose into simpler forms (sugars and amino sugars, and aliphatic and phenolic organic acids), which are further transformed into microbial biomass (microbial humus) or reorganized and further oxidized into humic assemblages (fulvic acids and humic acids), which bind to clay minerals and metal hydroxides. The ability of plants to absorb humic substances with their roots and metabolize them has been long debated. There is now a consensus that humus functions hormonally rather than simply nutritionally in plant physiology, and that organic substances exuded by roots and transformed in humus by soil organisms are an evolved strategy by which plants "talk" to the soil.
- Humus is a negatively charged colloidal substance which increases the cation-exchange capacity of soil, hence its ability to store nutrients by chelation. While these nutrient cations are available to plants, they are held in the soil and prevented from being leached by rain or irrigation.
- Humus can hold the equivalent of 80–90% of its weight in moisture and therefore increases the soil's capacity to withstand drought.
- The biochemical structure of humus enables it to moderate, i.e. buffer, excessive acidic or alkaline soil conditions.
- During humification, microbes secrete sticky, gum-like mucilages; these contribute to the crumby structure (tilth) of the soil by adhering particles together and allowing greater aeration of the soil. Toxic substances such as heavy metals and excess nutrients can be chelated, i.e., bound to the organic molecules of humus, and so prevented from leaching away.
- The dark, usually brown or black, color of humus helps to warm cold soils in spring.
- Humus can contribute to climate change mitigation through its carbon sequestration potential. Artificial humic acid and artificial fulvic acid synthesized from agricultural litter can increase the content of dissolved organic matter and total organic carbon in soil.

== See also ==
- Biochar
- Biomass
- Biotic material
- Detritus
- Glomalin
- Humic acid
- Immobilization (soil science)
- Mineralization (soil science)
- Mycorrhizal fungi and soil carbon storage
- Organic matter
- Plant litter
- Soil horizon
- Soil science
- Terra preta
- Humus form
