= Soil animals =

Invertebrates and vertebrates living in soil

Soil harbours a huge number of animal species (30% of arthropods live in soil), whether over their entire life or at least during larval stages. Soil offers protection against environmental hazards, such as excess temperature and moisture fluctuations, in particular in arid and cold environments, as well as against predation. Soil provisions food over the year, especially since omnivory seems the rule rather than the exception, and allows reproduction and egg deposition in a safe environment, even for those animals not currently living belowground. Many soil invertebrates, and also some soil vertebrates, are tightly adapted to a subterranean concealed environment, being smaller, blind, depigmented, legfree or with reduced legs, and reproducing asexually, with negative consequences on their colonization rate when the environment is changing at landscape scale. It has been argued that soil could have been a crucible for the evolution of invertebrate terrestrial faunas, as an intermediary step in the transition from aquatic to aerial life.

Soil fauna have been classified, according to increasing body size, in soil microfauna (20 μm to 200 μm), mesofauna (200 μm to 2 mm), macrofauna (2 mm to 2 cm) and megafauna (more than 2 cm). The size of soil animals determines their place along soil trophic networks (soil foodwebs), bigger species eating smaller species (predator-prey interactions) or modifying their environment (nested ecological niches). Among bigger species, soil engineers (e.g. earthworms, ants, termites, moles, gophers) play a prominent role in soil formation and vegetation development, giving them the rank of ecosystem engineers.

From a functional point of view soil animals are tightly interconnected with soil microorganisms (bacteria, archaea, fungi, algae). Soil microorganisms provide food to saprophagous and microbivorous species, and play a significant role in the digestion of recalcitrant compounds by saprophagous animals. In turn, soil animals, even the tiniest ones, create environments, e.g. digestive tracts, feces, cavities, favourable to soil microorganisms, allow their dispersal for those unable to move by their own means (e.g. non-motile bacteria), and regulate their populations.

The identification of soil animals, needing to be extracted (e.g. microarthropods, potworms, nematodes), expelled (earthworms), trapped (e.g. carabids) or searched by hand (e.g. termites, ants, millipedes, woodlice) before being observed under a dissecting, light microscope or electron microscope, has slowed down the development of soil zoology compared to the aboveground. To a few exceptions (e.g. vertebrates) the identification of soil animals was only done by specialists, using various published or unpublished keys and their own collections. From a few decades on molecular tools such as DNA barcoding helped field ecologists to achieve complete lists of species or OTUs. Such automated tools have been implemented in the study of nematodes, protozoa, and are still in development for other soil invertebrates such as earthworms and collembolans. They will be most useful for giving us reliable estimates of soil biodiversity, taking into account the huge amount of cryptic species which cannot be identified by morphological criteria.

== Soil microfauna ==
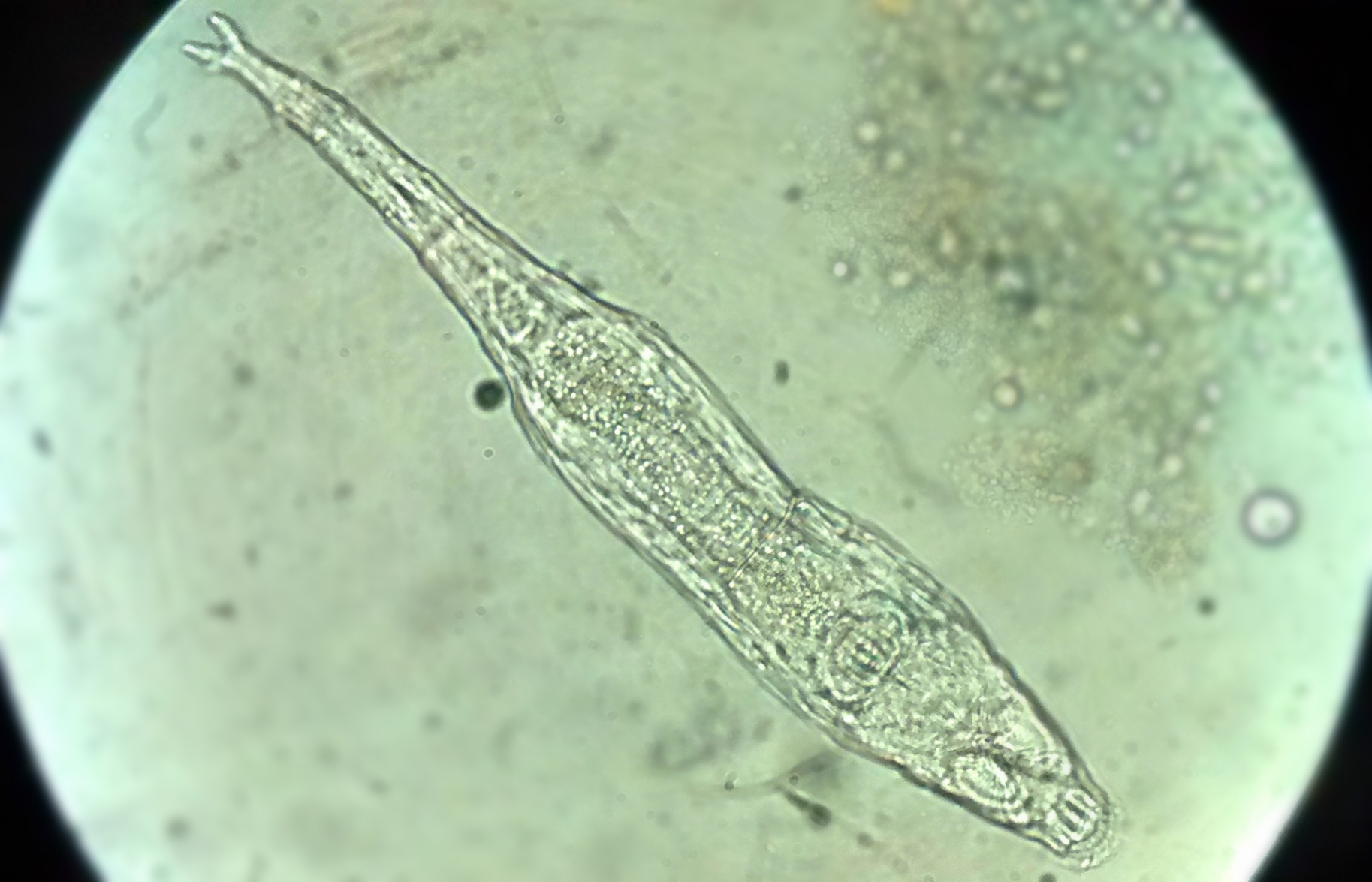
Rotifera microscopic view

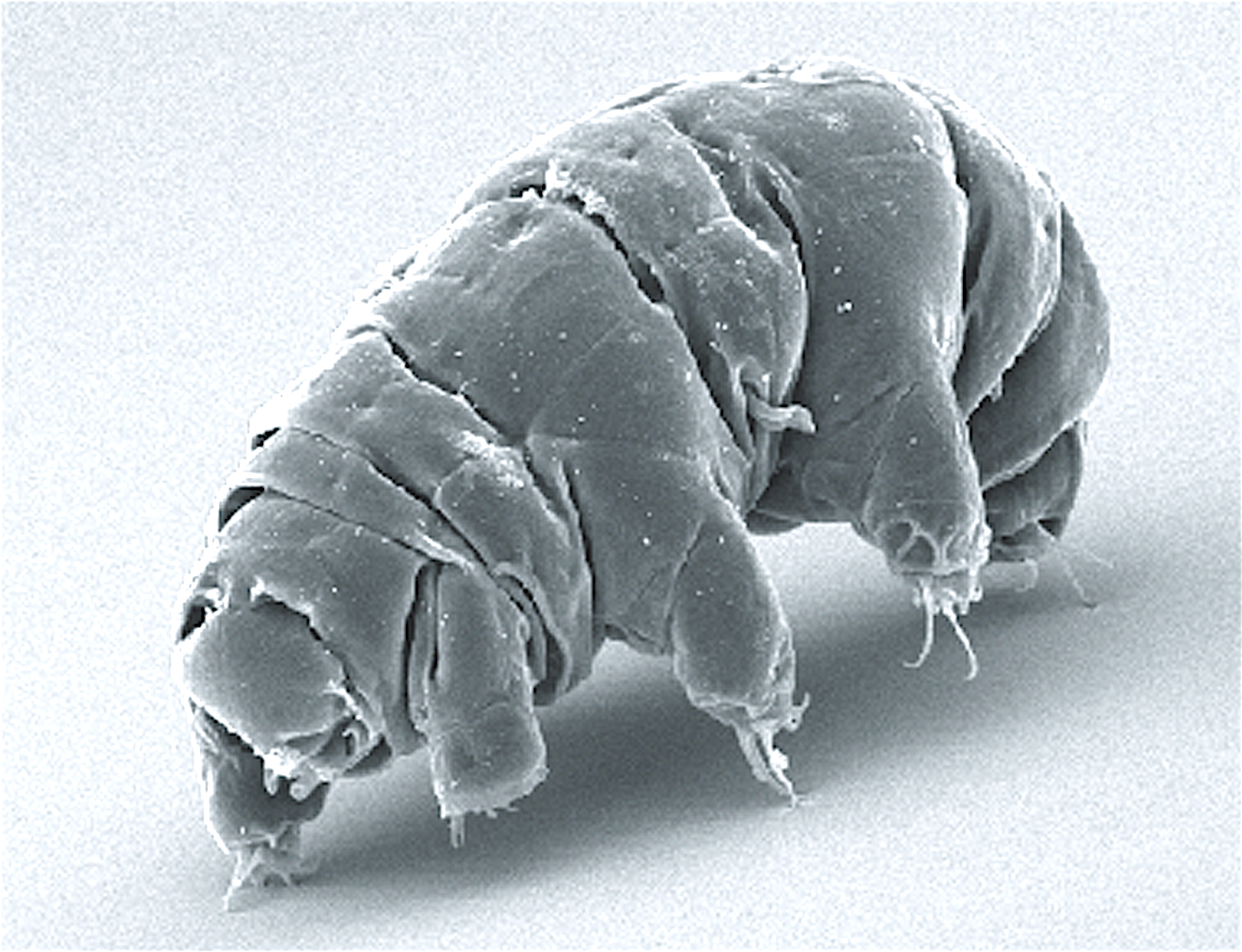
SEM image of Milnesium tardigradum in active state - journal.pone.0045682.g001-2

Soil microfauna comprise unicellular (protozoa), and multicellular (nematodes, rotifers, tardigrades) organisms. By their small size (20 μm to 200 μm) they are able to move within mesopores (30–75 μm) and macropores (>75 μm) where they find microorganisms (for microbivorous species) or other microfauna (for predatory species) as food. To the exception of resting stages (e.g. eggs, cysts, dauer larvae) microfauna are more often in tight contact with water films surrounding soil aggregates and roots (rhizoplane). Microfauna are involved in strong interactions with soil microorganisms, together consuming and stimulating them by rejuvenating microbial colonies. Through the excretion of nutrients in a plant-available form (e.g. ammonium) they contribute to plant nutrition.

Although difficult to verify experimentally, Clarholm's microbial loop hypothesis explained how the growth of roots, when exploring a new environment, exerts a priming effect on quiescent soil bacteria which in turn are predated by naked amoeba, liberating nitrogen in a mineral form, further absorbed by root hairs, stimulating in turn the plant through a positive feedback process.

Chemical signalling through the water film in which microfauna are living (e. g. chemotaxis) is strongly involved in intra-species (pheromone) and between-species (allomone) communication. Microfauna are also involved in chemical signalling with plants, in particular in parasitic forms (e. g. root-feeder nematodes). Interesting parallels between nematode-plant chemical interactions and plant-fungal symbioses (mycorrhizae) have been suggested.

Because of their physiological and locomotory dependence to pore water microfauna are very sensitive to moisture fluctuations. Variations in population size of active forms (e.g. protozoan trophozoites) are correlated with variations in soil moisture along precipitation cycles. However, resistant life-cycle cryptobiotic stages (e.g. protozoan resting cysts, nematode dauer larva, rotifer anhydrobiotes, tardigrade tuns), allow them to stay and wait for better conditions, restoring fully active metabolism with a few hours. It can thus be postulated that, contrary to most other soil invertebrates, soil microfauna will not suffer to a critical extent from climate warming, while they are highly sensitive to other man-induced global changes such as acid rains.

Although sexual reproduction (including sexual conjugation) is widespread in microfauna, allowing rapid adaptation (by genetic recombination) to environmental heterogeneity both in space and time, asexual reproduction (e.g. parthenogenesis, fission) is commonplace in protozoa (amoebae and flagellates), nematodes, rotifers, and tardigrades, allowing them to rapidly exploit new or temporary environments or new hosts for parasites. Infestation of female gonads by bacteria belonging to the genus Wolbachia, hereditary transmitted through the germline, has been found to be responsible for the loss of sexual reproduction and shift to parthenogenesis in some lineages of parasitic nematodes.

== Soil mesofauna ==
Soil mesofauna are invertebrates between 0.2 mm and 2 mm in size, which live in the soil or in a leaf litter layer on the soil surface. Members of this group include microarthropods (mites, springtails (collembola), proturans, diplurans, pseudoscorpions, symphyla, pauropods), and enchytraeids (potworms). By their intense consumption of plant remains (detritophagy) and microorganisms (microbivory) they play an important part in the carbon cycle and by their sensitivity to environmental hazards they are likely to be adversely affected by climate and land use change, and agricultural intensification.

Soil mesofauna feed on a wide range of materials including other soil animals, microorganisms (bacteria, archaea, fungi, algae), live or decaying plant material, lichens, spores, and pollen. Soil microarthropods play a negligible role in soil bioturbation and soil pore formation, but enchytraeids dig the soil and create galleries in which they deposit their faeces, giving them the rank of ecosystem engineers in soils (or in times) with poor earthworm activity. In addition to abovementioned food resources common to mesofauna, oribatid mites and springtails feed on decaying root material, a now fully recognized prominent food source for soil mesofauna. The fecal material of soil macrofauna (e. g. earthworm casts) is eaten and broken down by mesofauna. Earthworm casts are pulverized by enchytraeids eating on them, exemplifying the dynamic nature of soil aggregates and suggesting some kind of competition between two co-occurring ecosystem engineers of quite different size.. Contrary to microfauna the bigger size of mesofauna does not allow them to graze bacteria, which they consume together with organic and/or mineral matter while feeding on decaying plant material or animal faeces. Fungal hyphae and spores are actively consumed by microarthropods and enchytraeids, giving them a prominent place in the regulation of fungal communities, including mycorrhizal fungi. Fungal-feeding mesofauna play both a positive (through dissemination of spores and hyphal fragments) and a negative role (through severing connections) in mycorrhization and more generally in the development of soil fungal colonies and their ecosystem services (e.g. decomposition). Predatory species (e. g. mesostimatid mites, pseudoscorpions) eat mainly on springtails, which are also submitted to an active predation from macrofauna (e. g. centipedes, ground beetles, spiders), making springtails, with their high reproductive rate and large populations, a pivotal component of soil food webs, mediating indirect effects of predation on soil ecosystem services. However it has been shown that mesofauna customarily classified as saprophagous or microbivorous ingest also occasionally some animal prey (e. g. nematodes, protozoa, rotifers, tardigrades, small enchytraeids).

Contrary to enchytraeids, soil microarthropods do not have the ability to reshape the soil and, therefore, are forced to use the existing macropore network for their locomotion and access to food resources. This makes them highly sensitive to soil compaction, as it occurs under the influence of agricultural and sylvicultural intensification. Most species of soil mesofauna are susceptible to environmental changes through direct (e.g. plant litter quality, soil acidity, pollution, microclimate) and indirect (e.g. dispersal limitation, predation) influences. Some frost- and drought-resistant life forms exist, allowing mesofauna to await for better conditions, such as coccoons in enchytraeids, diapausing eggs in Collembola. Environmental heterogeneity is often reflected in the species composition of mesofaunal communities, making these animals good bioindicators of soil quality. However, they cannot track environmental changes when these are too rapid and in excess of their limited dispersal capacity, or when the landscape is fragmented in patches and inhospitable matrices cannot be crossed.

Mesofauna reproduce in a variety of ways. Potworms can reproduce both sexually and asexually, by fragmentation (fission) and subsequent regeneration as in the widespreaad Cognettia sphagnetorum. Thrips and most probably also pauropods reproduce by parthenogenesis (thelytoky). Diplurians, springtails and mites reproduce sexually, but some species facultatively or obligately reproduce by parthenogenesis, in particular those living deep in the soil. Wolbachia infestation and transmittance through the female germline is involved in microarthropod parthenogenesis.

== Soil macrofauna ==
Soil macrofauna are invertebrates between 2 mm and 2 cm in size, which live in the soil or in leaf litter. Known as soil engineers, earthworms, termites, ants, some millipedes (e.g. Polydesmida) and some insect larvae (e.g. tenebrionids), can make the pore spaces and hence can change the soil structure, one important aspect of soil morphology. By their size, their activity and abundance in the more fertile soils they condition the existence of various soil organisms and are typical of mull humus, harbouring a wide variety of trophic niches and more complex foodwebs. Being more exacting in nutrients than smaller organisms, because of their accumulation of calcium and nitrogen in thick chitinous arthropod exoskeletons and mollusc shells, and the active secretion of nutrient-rich mucus by earthworms and molluscs, soil macroinvertebrates need a plant cover able to redistribute nutrients in the soil through fast leaf and root litter decomposition. In turn, by favouring decomposer activity and nutrient cycling, macrofauna favours the growth of nutrient-exacting plant species, a positive aboveground-belowground feed-back which has been suggested to be a win-win evolutionarily stable strategy at the scale of the ecosystem in biomes with biologically favourable (not too cold, not too dry) climate and weatherable minerals in the parent rock.

Macrofauna feed on leaf litter (e.g. millipedes, woodlice, slugs, snails, tipulid larvae, epigeic and anecic (e.g. Lumbricus terrestris) earthworms), wood (e.g. lower termites, xylophagous beetles), humus (e.g. endogeic earthworms, higher termites), roots (e.g. elaterid larvae) or animal prey (e.g. centipedes, spiders, harvestmen, carabids), flatworms). Litter- and soil-feeding macrofauna contribute to litter and organic matter decomposition by comminuting plant remains and stimulating microbial activity of ingested soil, the so-called 'Sleeping beauty' paradigm, with the dormant bacteria as 'Sleeping Beauty' and the earthworm as 'Prince Charming'. Enzymes of symbiotic gut microflora are necessary requirements of digestive capacities of saprophagous macrofauna, in particular those able to digest wood or soil organic matter. In lower termites, symbiotic flagellates add their contribution to the digestion of lignocellulose in wood. Ingested plant or soil material is finely ground in earthworm gizzards and finely chewed by termite mandibles and mixed with saliva, giving their faeces a pasty appearance, further hardened by drought as seen in the formation of stable structures such as earthworm casts and termite mounds.

Reproduction of macrofauna is mainly sexual, with males well-differentiated from females, as in spiders, harvestmen, centipedes, carabids, but hermaphroditism is the rule in earthworms and molluscs (slugs, snails), while some earthworm species are facultatively or obligately parthenogenetic. Sexual reproduction (hermaphroditism) and asexual reproduction (parthenogenesis) are combined in free-living soil flatworms.

== Soil megafauna ==
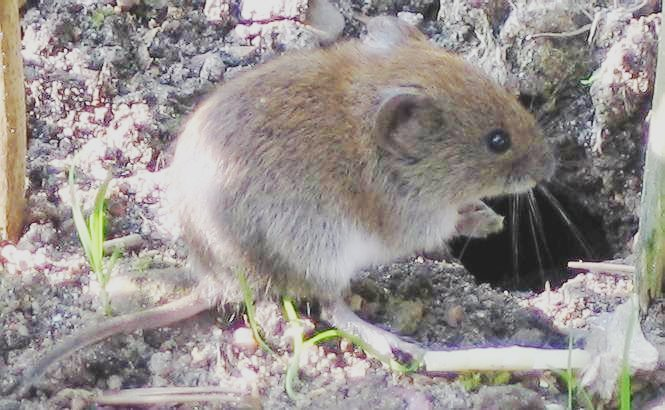
bank vole

Soil megafauna are soil animals (some bigger invertebrates but for the most part vertebrates) more than 2 cm in size, living in the soil where they dig nests and galleries (extensive tunnel networks) and eject earth at the soil surface as mounds. They consist of fossorial mammals (e.g. moles, pocket gophers, voles, badgers, mole-rats, ground squirrels, suricates, lemmings), birds (e.g. miners), reptiles (e.g. skinks, gopher tortoises, burrowing snakes) and amphibians (e.g. caecilians, mole salamanders), bigger earthworms (e.g. megascolecids) and macroarthropods (e.g. scorpions, scolopendrids). They are present in all biomes, but are more particularly represented in arid areas where the soil offers them a harbor against harshness of the environment (e.g. drought, heat, UV-radiation). Many other vertebrates live or rest in the soil temporarily, either for hibernation or protection against predation or both (e.g. rabbits, marmots, lemmings), and thus like permanent dwellers they participate to soil life through their burrowing activities. The megafauna that lives in the soil eat organic matter, insects and small vertebrates since most fossorial animals just dig the soil without feeding on it, and thus are not directly involved in decomposition and microbial-faunal relationships, but their mechanical disturbance of soil horizons may contribute to improve nutrient availability, infiltration rate, soil aeration, mycorrhizal inoculation and seed germination, making them providers of important ecosystem services.

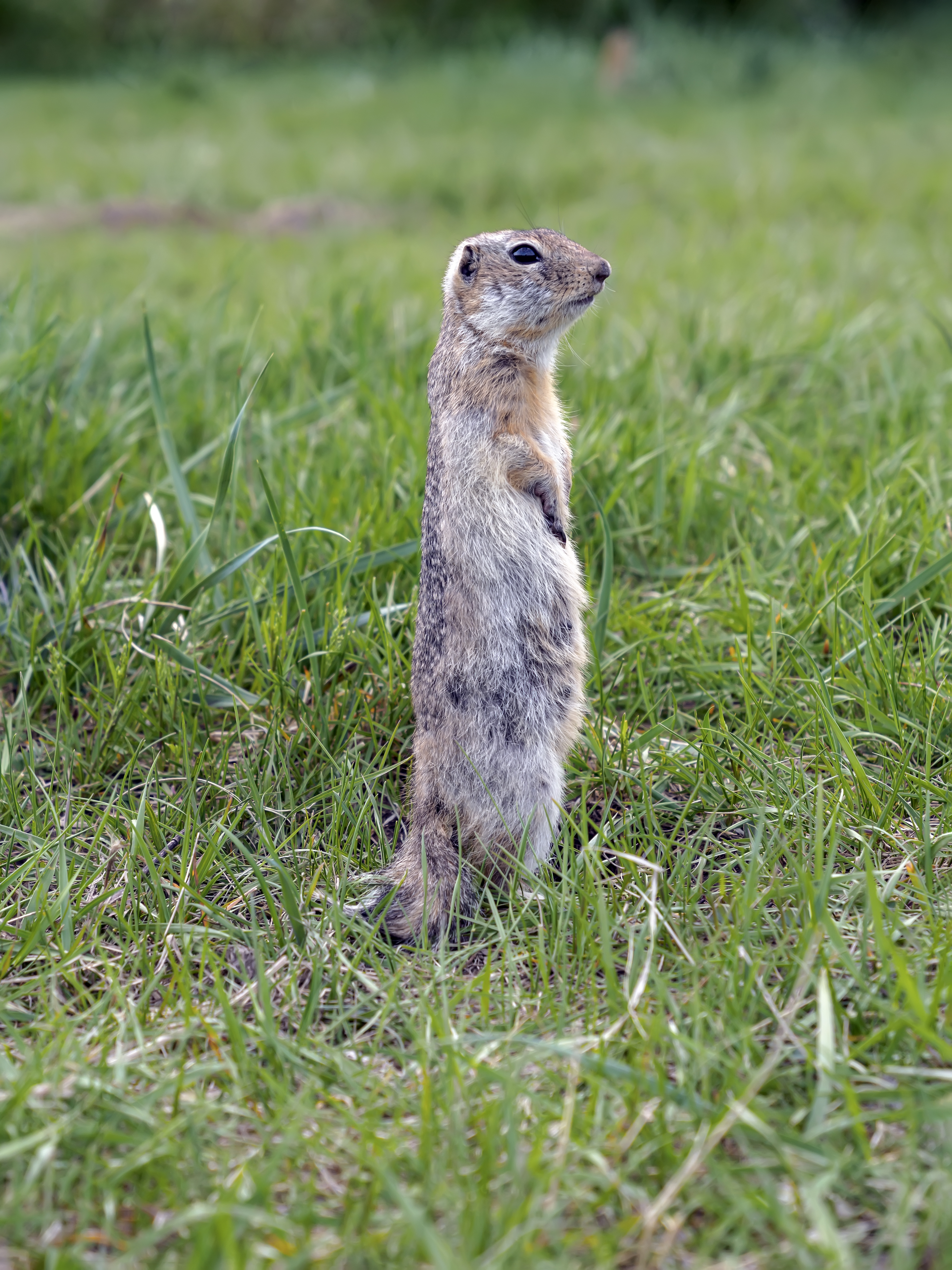
gopher

Soil fossorial vertebrates are carnivorous, feeding on soil invertebrates (e.g. caecilians, moles), or herbivores, consuming roots, seeds and tubers (e.g. voles, pocket gophers). They disseminate seeds and spores by carrying them on their fur, scales or feathers or incorporating them in their feces after gut transit. Fossorial mammals contribute to disseminate mycorrhizal fungi when feeding on fruiting bodies, and facilitate seed germination in their excavated mounds, making them, beside and through their often reported influence on soil morphology, important agents of vegetation dynamics, giving them the rank of ecosystem engineers.

Reproduction occurs through the search for sexual partners, using chemical communication within social groups, with an evolutionary link between group-living and fossoriality. Fossoriality among vertebrates is associated with appendage reduction, and has been considered as an evolutionary dead end in some groups like snakes.

Often considered as pests by agriculturists, the disappearance of fossorial vertebrates from entire landscapes was considered as an ecological catastrophe, in particular in arid and semi-arid environments where they are often considered as keystone species for soil health. Special programs for the reintroduction of endangered native species have been implemented in Australia.
