= Podsolisation =

Podsolisation is an extreme form of leaching which causes the eluviation of iron and aluminium sesquioxides.

The process generally occurs in areas where precipitation is greater than evapotranspiration. The minerals are removed by a process known as leaching.

When organic material is broken down nutrients are released, but at the same time organic acids are released. These organic acids are known as chelating agents. Many podsol soils form underneath coniferous forests, the fact that pine trees are evergreen causes a very thin litter layer inhibiting the production of humus. As a result, an acidic (pH 4.5) mor humus is produced which provides a greater amount of chelating agents.

== The A Horizon ==
In podsolisation, chelating agents break down clay and release minerals such as iron and aluminium. When iron and aluminium are hydrated they become sesquioxides. The sesquioxides are translocated from the A Horizon, a zone of out-washing, to the B Horizon, a zone of illuviation. Many bases such as calcium and potassium are also leached from the zone along with organic matter and silica. Often minerals like quartz and silica are left behind in the A horizon. What is significantly different about podsols in comparison to other soils is that the bottom of A horizon is known as the AE horizon, which is an eluviated area which has lost sesquioxides. It tends to be an ash gray colour.

== The B Horizon ==
The B Horizon has dark layer where minerals, organic matter and bases are being illuviated (washed in/accumulated). Below this is a red/orange layer of iron and aluminium sesquioxides deposit. Some bases remain in the soil, though others may be lost by throughflow. In many podsols, Iron Pans are created. This can cause water logging which may then saturate the A horizon leading to mottling or a gleyed podsol.

Also useful: soil chemistry
