= Peter Erasmus Müller (forester) =

Danish forester and naturalist (1840–1926)

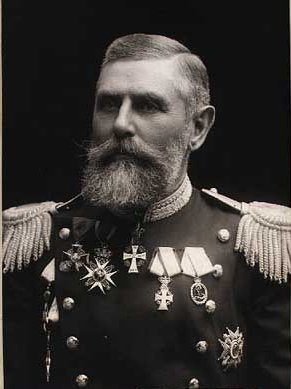
- Born: 25 October 1840; Copenhagen, Denmark
- Died: 5 October 1926 (aged 85); Copenhagen, Denmark
- Known for: Humus form
- Scientific career
- Fields: Forestry

Peter Erasmus Müller (1840 – 1926) was a Danish forester and naturalist. He studied mor humus.

== Biography ==
Born 1840, Müller was the son of the director of the Royal Danish Coin and Medal Collection, Ludvig Müller, and Eleonore VFG Levetzau. After taking the preliminary examination in 1856, he studied practical agriculture for a few years and took the agricultural examination in 1861. There he resumed his academic studies, which had been interrupted for health reasons, became a student in 1863, a forestry candidate in 1867, took the philosophy degree in the same year and also won the University of Copenhagen's gold medal that same year for a zoological thesis, Danmarks Cladocera. In 1868, he embarked on a longer trip abroad to Central and Southern Europe, especially to train as a forester, but at the same time used a stay in Switzerland to study lake crustaceans.

In 1871, he defended his doctorate with Observations on some Siphonophores, and the following year he was appointed teacher of forestry at the Danish Agricultural College, a position he held until 1882, when he entered the administration as a transfer officer at the state forests. The transfer officer position was linked to the position of royal gamekeeper, that is he was responsible for the hunts of the king and the court. In 1883, he became chief inspector of the forests of Sorø Academy, in 1884 a member of the Danish Academy of Sciences, and over time a number of other positions were entrusted to him.

== Career ==
Müller received his forestry education partly at the 1st Sorø Forest District, partly at the Agricultural University, and partly during trips abroad. He greatly influenced Danish forestry, partly through his teaching and partly through his literary work. In almost all areas of forestry he introduced a new basis for teaching, and this was very independent in the case of forestry and forestry history, while the other technical and economic parts of the subject were mainly taken from the latest German works, while the administrative side of forestry was more distant to him. When he felt that the forestry students did not receive preparatory instruction in plant physiology and general economics, he himself gave them a brief presentation of what was necessary in these areas as an introduction to forestry and industrial studies, respectively. His excellent abilities as a teacher were particularly evident during excursions, where he greatly opened the students' eyes to the phenomena of nature and their causal connections.

He also exerted a noticeable influence on Danish forestry by being the leader at a large number of meetings and exhibitions, in commissions and committees concerning forestry matters, and by frequently acting as an advisor to forest owners.

As late as 1924, Müller published through the Danish Academy of Sciences a last major literary work: Contributions to the Natural History of the Jutland Heaths, Karup Heaths and Related Formations, the main result of which was that the Danish heaths must be assumed to lie as a direct continuation of the tundra that arose after the ice age, from which it follows that they have not been forested in the same way as the hilly heaths, the heath marshes and the banks along the river valleys.

== Journal of Forestry ==
In 1875, he began publishing Tidsskrift for Skovbrug as the first independent journal of Danish forestry, thereby laying the foundation for all subsequent forestry literature. In this journal he published the results of his forestry studies, of which especially those concerning the forest soil have had a profound influence by demonstrating the influence of plant communities and the associated animals on the Earth's surface, such as the formation of heathland, the emergence of Red soil as a result of the peat that forms on top of the soil, and similar phenomena in the forest. His statistical studies of Danish forestry also revealed much that had not previously been generally recognized, and contributed greatly to spreading the understanding of forestry practices and living conditions. For the sake of heathland and dune planting, he carried out a plant geographical and partly botanical study of the Scots pine, mainly on a journey to the home of this tree species in southern Central Europe. He continued his journal until 1891 (a total of 12 volumes), and by making it an archive of original Danish studies from the beginning, he succeeded in producing a number of good treatises by a number of authors.

== Nature conservation ==
PE Müller was a pioneer in nature conservation in Denmark. As a member of the Natural History Association, he was elected to the committee for nature conservation, of which he was a member from 1905 to 1925 and chairman from 1912 to 1917. Müller thus played a leading role in the creation of the first nature conservation law from 1917. Already around the turn of the century, certain forest areas had been protected on Müller's initiative, e.g. Hald Egeskov and some old beech stands in the Farum forest district, and he was diligently involved in the operation of Jægersborg Dyrehave, which fell under his transfer inspection.

== Honors ==
In addition to becoming a member of the Swedish Academy of Sciences in 1884, Müller was made an honorary member of the Swedish Forest Conservation Association, of the Danish Forestry Candidates Association, the Russian Forest Corps, and in 1921 he was appointed an honorary doctor at the Hochschule für Bodenkultur in Vienna. He was made a Knight of the Order of the Dannebrog in 1881, a Dannebrogsmand in 1888, a Commander of the 2nd degree in 1892 and of the 1st degree in 1906, and received the Grand Cross in 1911.

== Marriage ==
Müller was married on October 10, 1874, in Garnisons Church to Augusta Sophie Thiele (July 7, 1851 in Copenhagen – March 29, 1928), daughter of secretary at the Danish Academy of Fine Arts, later director of the Royal Danish Collection of Copperplate Engravings, Just Mathias Thiele, and Hanne née Aagesen.

He is buried at Assistens Cemetery.

== Authorship ==
PE Müller had an extensive scientific writing output, published among other things in the series of articles "Studier over Skovjord" (1878—84), which appeared in the Journal of Forestry published by him. Among his most important writings are:

- Contribution to the History of Reproduction of the Gladocerans (1868)
- The Phyllopoda found in Denmark so far (1873)
- On Vegetation Water (1876)
- Studies on Forest Soil (1879 and 1884; translated into German and French),
- Outline of a Danish Forestry Statistics (1881),
- On the Mountain Pine. An Experiment in Applied Plant Geography (1887—89),
- "Forestry" (in: Statistics Denmark, 1887),
- Forestry History and Statistics, I, Denmark (autographed lecture, 1882),
- Lectures on Silviculture (autographed 1882).
- On the Relation of Earthworms to Rhizome Plants (1894)
- Contribution to the Natural History of the Jutland Heathlands, Karup Heathlands and Related Formations (1924)

== Literature ==
- Vagn Jensen : "Peter Erasmus Müller" in Naturens Verden 1982 no. 2, pp. 57–64
- CS de Roepstorff "Peter Erasmus Müller" in: Forest State, 2nd edition.
