= Mor humus =

Humus formed in coniferous forests

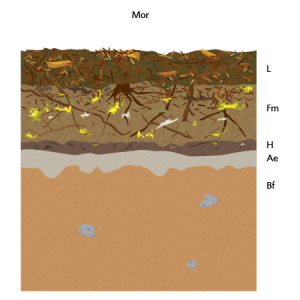
Horizon levels of Mor humus and the soil below

Mor is a humus form occurring mostly in coniferous forests and ericaceous heathlands. Mor humus consists of evergreen needles, ericaceous twigs and foliage and woody debris that litter the forest floor. This litter is slow to decompose, in part due to its chemical composition (low pH, low nutrient content, high lignin, tannin or terpenic content), but also because of the generally cool and wet conditions where mor humus is found. This results in low bacterial activity and an absence of earthworms and a low presence of other soil fauna. Because of this, most of the organic matter decomposition in mor humus is carried out by fungi.

Mor humus is one of three current classifications of forest floor humus, along with Moder and Mull. Each class corresponds to a scale of increasingly colder conditions, decreasing biological diversity and activity, and decreasing nutrient availability. Mor humus ranks at the bottom of this scale and is characterized by very slow decomposition and accumulation of plant material. In the seminal work of Peter Erasmus Müller on Danish forest soils, which described mor for the first time, this humus form was called beech peat by analogy with sphagnum peat.

== Morpho-functional features ==
Mor humus has three distinct organic horizons: an OL horizon (litter horizon), atop an OF horizon (fermentation horizon), followed by a more or less thick (sometimes absent) OH horizon (humus horizon), before a sharp transition to the mineral soil (E horizon).

The OL horizon is very thick and is made up of undecomposed organic material. In coniferous forests the litter is composed primarily of evergreen needles, conifer cones, and woody debris. In ericaceous heaths the litter is composed of ericaceous leaves and twigs, included in a dense network of subterranean rhizomes growing more or less horizontally through the forest floor. In the OL horizon of mor, living (green) and dead (brown) parts of mosses are often associated with coniferous needles, which do not shade out mosses, contrary to deciduous leaves.

The OF horizon below consists of plant remains still in varying degrees of decomposition. A layered and compact-matted structure caused by the interweaving of plant roots and fungal hyphae make up the fermentation layer, with a very weak contribution of animal faeces, contrary to the OF horizon of moder. Through their distinct yellow and white coloration, the fungal hyphae in this horizon are identifiable as cellulose-decomposing fungi, which are the primary decomposers of organic matter in mor humus, and ectomycorrhizal fungi (with conifers) and ericoid mycorrhizal fungi (with Ericaceae) which contribute to nitrogen uptake and transfer to their host plant, and act as a sink for carbon. The plant roots present further contribute more organic residues through exudation.

The OH horizon is composed of humified plant material, resulting from the slow and incomplete process of fungal decomposition. There is very little blending of material between the humus layer and the mineral soil below resulting in the poor content in organic matter in the top mineral soil horizon.

Rather than being intimately mixed (clay, silt) or juxtaposed (sand) with mineral particles, like in the A horizon of mull or moder, organic matter, either in colloidal or dissolved form (DOC), is leached (eluviated) through the E horizon until deposited (illuviated) below in the B horizon, a process typical of podzolization. Despite the clear distinction between Mor and all other humus forms stemming from the absence of an A horizon and the sharp transition from the forest floor to the mineral soil, mor and moder (in particular Dysmoder) were often confused under the designation of raw humus, embracing a wide variety of variants, from poorly to highly biologically active.

== Formation ==
Compared to the litter of deciduous forests, evergreen needles have relatively low nutrient content and a much lower pH. This makes mor humus acidic to very acidic in nature. In coniferous forests and ericaceous heaths, foliage litter can also contain high concentrations of tannins and terpenes. Tannins protect vegetation from insects attacks and infections and reduce soil pH. All of these factors result in mor humus being an undesirable habitat for soil fauna. Soil bacteria are also unable to metabolize organic matter efficiently when pH is low. Consequently, the majority of decomposition in mor humus is performed by soil fungi.

== Nutrient availability ==
The high volume of undecomposed organic matter in the OF horizon of mor humus leads to a high C:N ratio and can immobilize important plant nutrients such as nitrogen. The high C:N and C:P ratios of mor humus slow the release of nutrients available to plants, restricting in turn plant development and favouring the production of a nutrient-poor litter, thus closing the feed-back loop between humus and vegetation. Far from being improper to plant growth and soil life and needing to be improved by fertiization, mor humus with its short food chains should be considered as the best ecological strategy by which plants, animals and microbes cope with the harsh environmental or nutritional conditions associated with high altitude, high latitude or nutrient-poor geological substrates (e.g. quartz sand, quartzite).

== Classification ==
In the British Columbian classification of humus forms, Mor is subdivided in Velomor, Xeromor, Hemimor, Hemihumimor, and Humimor for well-aerated (terrestrial) humus forms, and Hydromor and Histomor for poorly aerated (semi-terrestrial) humus forms.

In HUMUSICA, a worldwide classification of humus forms, Mor is considered as a humus system (abbreviation of humus interaction system) and subdivided in Hemimor, Eumor, and Humimor as humus forms. They exhibit the following morphological characteristics:

- Hemimor: presence of a discontinuous non-zoogenic OF horizon and presence of an OH horizon.
- Eumor: presence of a continuous non-zoogenic OF horizon and absence of an OH horizon.
- Humimor: presence of a continuous non-zoogenic OF horizon and a continuous OH horizon.

== See also ==
- Moder humus
- Mull humus
- Humus form
