= Mull humus =

Mull forest humus

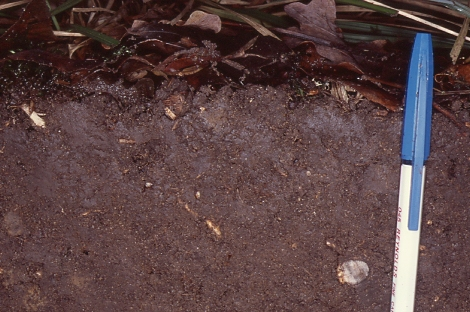
Mull humus profile in an oak forest

Mull humus is distinguishable from the other terrestrial humus types moder, mor, amphi and tangel in characteristics, formation, nutrient cycling, productivity, etc. It is characterized by the granular structure of its A horizon and the absence of an OH horizon.

== Characteristics ==
Mull is the product of the mixing activity of burrowing soil animals such as earthworms, ants, termites, moles or pocket gophers which create nests and burrows within the soil biomantle. Mull displays a more rapid and complete litter decomposition. Due to the presence of various soil organisms, from microbes to mammals, and high biological activity in mull, the disappearance of plant litter is fast, and there are no distinct layers because thick organic horizons do not accumulate. Conversely, the A horizon is well developed, resulting from the assemblage of humified organic matter with mineral particles. Broadleaf tree species, the significant components in the deciduous forest ecosystems aligned with mull, appear to be effective in raising soil organic matter levels. Also, plants under mull humus produce litters that are easier decomposable with a low C:N ratio, allowing nutrient release, preventing immobilization, and encouraging high bioturbation. Moreover, a relatively complete decomposition relates to more completely oxidized organic acids, promoting a higher value of pH and base saturation in the soil.

== Formation ==
The formation of mull humus form results from various factors, including regional climate, parent rock, vegetation, and soil organisms. Mull is present in deciduous forests, and its development is often associated with a mild climate in terms of warm temperature and moderate precipitation, also with rich soil parent materials. Soil organisms, including invertebrates and microbes, are the agents for the intimate mixing of soil organic matter into the mineral soil rather than organic matter accumulation on the surface, leading to mull.

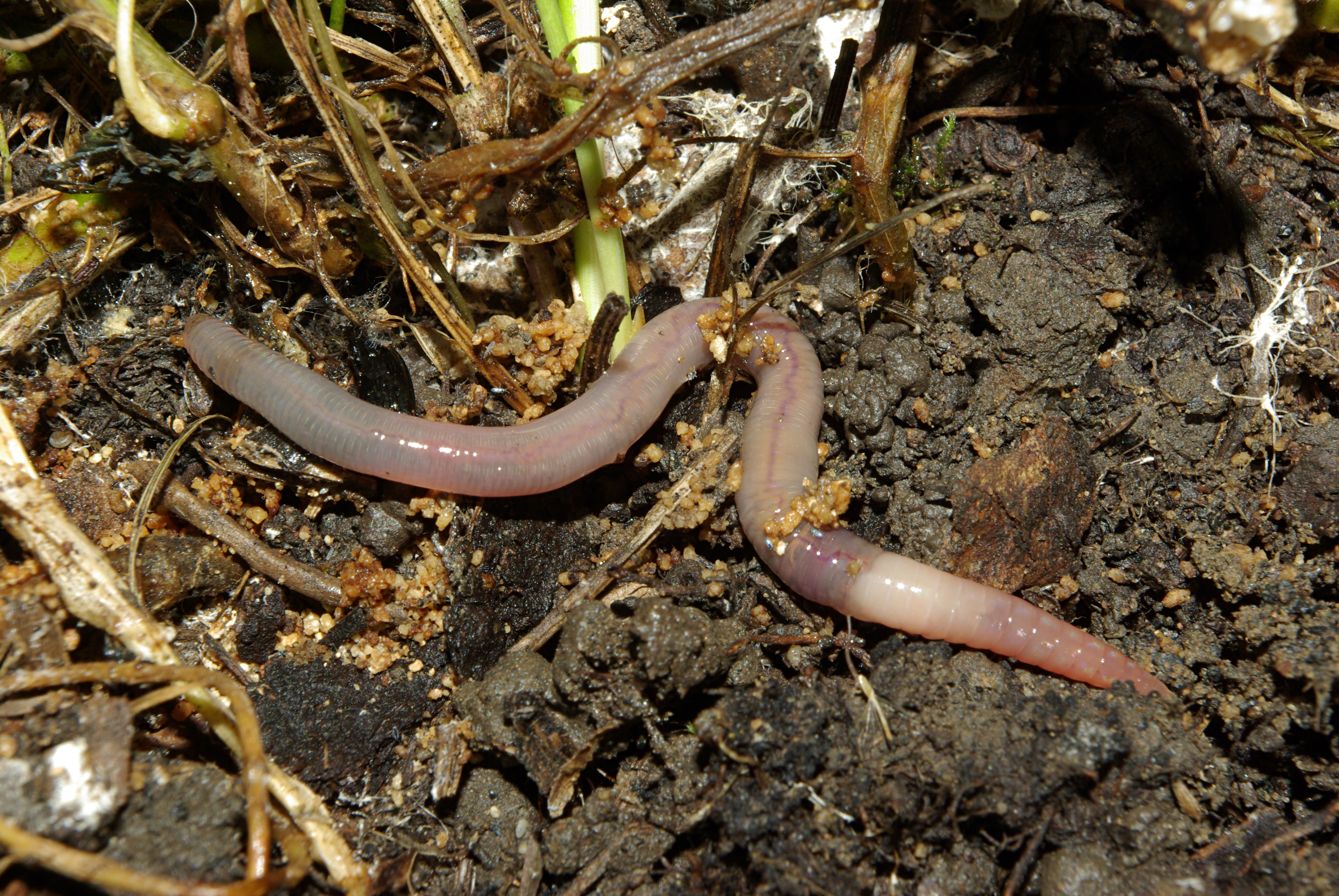
Lumbricus terrestris, a mull-forming earthworm species

Earthworms are the most widespread invertebrate group in the formation of mull. They comminute microbially decomposed plant remains into small pieces and bury those residues into the soil, having significant roles in their decomposition and in the formation of stable mineral-organic assemblages in the macro-structured A horizon. The feeding and burrowing functions of the earthworms have a decisive influence on the control of soil organic matter levels. Other agents may also contribute to incorporating soil organic matter into the mineral soil, such as white-rot fungi and bacteria belonging to the microbial group. They act as essential decomposers, facilitating the breakdown process of organic residues and increasing their palatability to earthworms by decreasing their recalcitrant (lignin) and toxic (tannin) content. However, even if mull formation by earthworms is well known from Charles Darwin's seminal work, many other soil invertebrate and vertebrate animal groups can be involved in the formation of mull, depending on climate and past history of land colonization. Millipedes, in particular Polydesmida, have been described as mull-formers in old-growth forests of the Appalachians, still not invaded by burrowing European earthworms. In arid and semi-arid environments darkling beetles have conspicuous fossorial habits, creating mull-like biogenic granular structures. Fossorial mammals (e.g. voles, prairie dogs, pocket gophers), contribute to the formation of mull through their excavating, feeding and defecating activities.

The intensive bioturbation processes that create mull humus occur primarily within the soil biomantle, the upper organic-rich zone where biological mixing dominates soil formation. The resulting intimate association of organic matter with mineral particles creates the characteristic granular structure and high soil fertility associated with mull.

== Biodiversity and fertility ==
Mull is the cause and result of plant-soil relationships. Litter quality, soil nutrient availability, and organism activity are related. Mull harbours a high biomass and species richness of soil fauna, ranging from megafauna to microfauna. Those soil organisms have high nutrient requirements because they have high energy costs for capturing space and nutrients under high competition, explaining the fast use of nutrients. Also, the variety of organisms reflects nutrient availability, which is necessary for the build-up of mull humus. Consequently, high nutrient availability and fast use of nutrients allow rapid cycling of nutrients. Mull humus profiles are the seat of numerous disturbances linked to the burrowing, feeding and defecating activities of engineering species, contributing to increase soil heterogeneity and consequently soil biodiversity.

A rapid nutrient cycling can further contribute to soil fertility and enrich aboveground and belowground biodiversity, indicating a high level of biodiversity and productivity. Optimal plant growth depends on the degree of litter decomposition because litter provides most nutrients required by plants. Associating with soil organisms, a positive feedback loop will be formed: the higher the litter quality, the faster organic matter decomposition, the faster nutrient cycling, and the faster vegetation growth. In forests more vascular plants and less mosses cohabit in mull, compared with moder and mor. However, too much nutrient availability may negatively impact plant biodiversity, because of either toxicity when in excess of plant nutrient requirements, or exploitative competition and allelopathy from actively growing plant species with high nutrient requirements. However, the moderate level of nutrient availability provided by mull in the absence of external inputs (e.g. mineral fertilizers, manure) optimizes plant biodiversity.

== Classification ==
In the British Columbian classification of humus forms, Mull is subdivided in Rhizomull and Vermimull for well-aerated (terrestrial) humus forms in forests and grasslands, Hydromull and Saprimull for poorly aerated (semi-terrestrial) humus forms in bogs and fens.

In the German classification of humus forms, Mull is subdivided in L-mull and F-mull, each of them subdivided in numerous subtypes.

In the French classification of humus forms, Mull is subdivided in Eumull, Mesomull, Oligomull, Dysmull and Amphimull.

In HUMUSICA, a worldwide classification of humus forms, Mull is considered as a humus system (abbreviation of humus interaction system) and subdivided in Eumull, Mesomull, Oligomull and Dysmull as humus forms, while Amphimull is considered as a separate humus system. They exhibit the following morphological characteristics:

- Eumull: presence of a discontinuous OL horizon and a A horizon with a granular structure seasonally visible at the surface.
- Mesomull: presence of a continuous OL horizon and a A horizon with a granular structure.
- Oligomull: presence of a discontinuous OF horizon under the continuous OL horizon and a A horizon with a granular structure.
- Dysmull: presence of a continuous OF horizon under the continuous OL horizon and a A horizon with a granular structure.

The gradient of increasing contribution of organic layers to the humus profile, from Eumull to Dysmull, has been included in a numerical scale covering all lowland terrestrial humus forms, called Humus Index. The Humus Index is an ordinal scale which can be rank correlated with other parameters measured on soil or vegetation, and thus can be used as an indicator of soil health or forest stand development. It has been shown to covary with soil fertility, forest management type and tree age, pollution level, and plant species richness.
