= Soil pH =

Measure of how acidic or alkaline the soil is

Global variation in soil pH. Acidic Neutral Alkaline No data

Soil pH is a measure of the acidity or basicity (alkalinity) of a soil. Soil pH is a key characteristic that can be used to make informative analysis both qualitative and quantitatively regarding soil characteristics. pH is defined as the negative logarithm (base 10) of the activity of hydronium ions (H^{+} or, more precisely, H_{3}O^{+}_{aq}) in a solution. In soils, it is measured in a slurry of soil mixed with water (or a salt solution, such as 0.01 M CaCl_{2}), and normally falls between 3 and 10, with 7 being neutral. Acidic soils have a pH below 7 and alkaline soils have a pH above 7. Ultra-acidic soils (pH < 3.5) and very strongly alkaline soils (pH > 9) are rare.

Soil pH is considered a master variable in soils as it affects many chemical processes. It specifically affects plant nutrient availability by controlling the chemical forms of the different nutrients and influencing the chemical reactions they undergo. The optimum pH range for most plants is between 5.5 and 7.5. However, many plants have adapted to thrive at pH values outside this range.

== Classification of soil pH ranges ==
The United States Department of Agriculture Natural Resources Conservation Service classifies soil pH ranges as follows:

Semantic description	pH range
Ultra acidic	< 3.5
Extremely acidic	3.5–4.4
Very strongly acidic	4.5–5.0
Strongly acidic	5.1–5.5
Moderately acidic	5.6–6.0
Slightly acidic	6.1–6.5
Neutral	6.6–7.3
Slightly alkaline	7.4–7.8
Moderately alkaline	7.9–8.4
Strongly alkaline	8.5–9.0
Very strongly alkaline	> 9.0

== Determining pH ==
Methods of determining pH include:

- Observation of soil profile: certain profile characteristics can be indicators of either acid, saline, or sodic conditions. Examples are:
  - Poor incorporation of the organic surface layer with the underlying mineral layer – this can indicate strongly acidic soils;
  - The classic podzol horizon sequence, since podzols are strongly acidic: in these soils, a pale eluvial (E) horizon lies under the organic surface layer and overlies a dark B horizon;
  - Presence of a caliche layer indicates the presence of calcium carbonates, which are present in alkaline conditions;
  - Columnar structure can be an indicator of sodic condition.
- Observation of predominant flora. Calcifuge plants (those that prefer an acidic soil) include Erica, Rhododendron and nearly all other Ericaceae species, many birch (Betula), foxglove (Digitalis), gorse (Ulex spp.), and Scots pine (Pinus sylvestris). Calcicole (lime loving) plants include ash trees (Fraxinus spp.), honeysuckle (Lonicera), Buddleja, dogwoods (Cornus spp.), lilac (Syringa) and Clematis species. This observational method has been used to calibrate Ellenberg's reaction indicator values.
- Use of an inexpensive pH testing kit, wherein a small sample of soil is mixed with indicator solution which changes colour according to the acidity.
- Use of litmus paper. A small sample of soil is mixed with distilled water, into which a strip of litmus paper is inserted. If the soil is acidic the paper turns red, if basic, blue.
- Certain other fruit and vegetable pigments also change colour in response to changing pH. Blueberry juice turns more reddish if acid is added, and becomes indigo if titrated with sufficient base to yield a high pH. Red cabbage is similarly affected.
- Use of a commercially available electronic pH meter, in which a electrode or solid-state electrode is inserted into moistened soil or a mixture (suspension) of soil and water; the pH is usually read on a digital display screen.
- In the 2010s, spectrophotometric methods were developed to measure soil pH involving addition of an indicator dye to the soil extract. These compare well to glass electrode measurements but offer substantial advantages such as lack of drift, liquid junction and suspension effects.

Precise, repeatable measures of soil pH are required for scientific research and monitoring. This generally entails laboratory analysis using a standard protocol; an example of such a protocol is that in the USDA Soil Survey Field and Laboratory Methods Manual. In this document the three-page protocol for soil pH measurement includes the following sections: Application; Summary of Method; Interferences; Safety; Equipment; Reagents; and Procedure.

Summary of Method

The pH is measured in soil-water (1:1) and soil-salt (1:2 $\ce{CaCl2}$) solutions. For convenience, the pH is initially measured in water and then measured in $\ce{CaCl2}$. With the addition of an equal volume of 0.02 M $\ce{CaCl2}$ to the soil suspension that was prepared for the water pH, the final soil-solution ratio is 1:2 0.01 M $\ce{CaCl2}$.
A 20-g soil sample is mixed with 20 mL of reverse osmosis (RO) water (1:1 w:v) with occasional stirring. The sample is allowed to stand 1 h with occasional stirring. The sample is stirred for 30 s, and the 1:1 water pH is measured. The 0.02 M $\ce{CaCl2}$ (20 mL) is added to soil suspension, the sample is stirred, and the 1:2 0.01 M $\ce{CaCl2}$ pH is measured (4C1a2a2).

— Summary of the USDA NRCS method for soil pH determination

== Factors affecting soil pH ==
The pH of a natural soil depends on the mineral composition of the parent material of the soil, and the weathering reactions undergone by that parent material. In warm, humid environments, soil acidification occurs over time as the products of weathering are leached by water moving laterally or downwards through the soil. In dry climates, however, soil weathering and leaching are less intense and soil pH is often neutral or alkaline.

=== Sources of acidity ===
Many processes contribute to soil acidification. These include:

- Rainfall: Average rainfall has a pH of 5.6 and is moderately acidic due to dissolved atmospheric carbon dioxide (CO_{2}) that combines with water to form carbonic acid (H_{2}CO_{3}). When this water flows through the soil it results in the leaching of basic cations such as bicarbonates; this increases the percentage of Al^{3+} and H^{+} relative to other cations.
- Root respiration and decomposition of organic matter by microorganisms release CO_{2} which increases the carbonic acid (H_{2}CO_{3}) concentration and subsequent leaching.
- Plant growth: Plants take up nutrients in the form of ions (e.g. NO^{−}_{3}, NH^{+}_{4}, Ca^{2+}, H_{2}PO^{−}_{4}), and they often take up more cations than anions, in particular in legumes. However, plants must maintain a neutral charge in their roots. In order to compensate for the extra positive charge, they will release H^{+} ions from the root. Some plants also exude organic acids into the soil to acidify the zone around their roots to help solubilize metal nutrients that are insoluble at neutral pH, such as iron (Fe).
- Fertilizer use: Ammonium (NH^{+}_{4}) fertilizers react in the soil by the process of nitrification to form nitrate (NO^{−}_{3}), and in the process release H^{+} ions.
- Acid rain: The burning of fossil fuels releases oxides of sulfur and nitrogen into the atmosphere. These react with water in the atmosphere to form sulfuric and nitric acid in rain.
- Oxidative weathering: Oxidation of some primary minerals, especially sulfides and those containing Fe^{2+}, generate acidity. This process is often accelerated by human activity:
  - Mine spoil: Severely acidic conditions can form in soils near some mine spoils due to the oxidation of pyrite.
  - Acid sulfate soils formed naturally in waterlogged coastal and estuarine environments can become highly acidic when drained or excavated.

=== Sources of alkalinity ===
Total soil alkalinity increases with:

- Weathering of silicate, aluminosilicate and carbonate minerals containing Na^{+}, Ca^{2+}, Mg^{2+} and K^{+}
- Addition of silicate, aluminosilicate and carbonate minerals to soils; this may happen by deposition of material eroded elsewhere by wind or water, or by mixing of the soil with less weathered material (such as the addition of limestone to acid soils)
- Addition of water containing dissolved bicarbonates (as occurs when irrigating with high-bicarbonate waters)

The accumulation of alkalinity in a soil (as carbonates and bicarbonates of Na, K, Ca and Mg) occurs when there is insufficient water flowing through the soils to leach soluble salts. This may be due to arid conditions, or poor internal soil drainage; in these situations most of the water that enters the soil is transpired (taken up by plants) or evaporates, rather than flowing through the soil.

The soil pH usually increases when the total alkalinity increases, but the balance of the added cations also has a marked effect on the soil pH. For example, increasing the amount of sodium in an alkaline soil tends to induce dissolution of calcium carbonate, which increases the pH. Calcareous soils may vary in pH from 7.0 to 9.5, depending on the degree to which Ca^{2+} or Na^{+} dominate the soluble cations.

== Effect of soil pH on plant growth ==
=== Acid soils ===
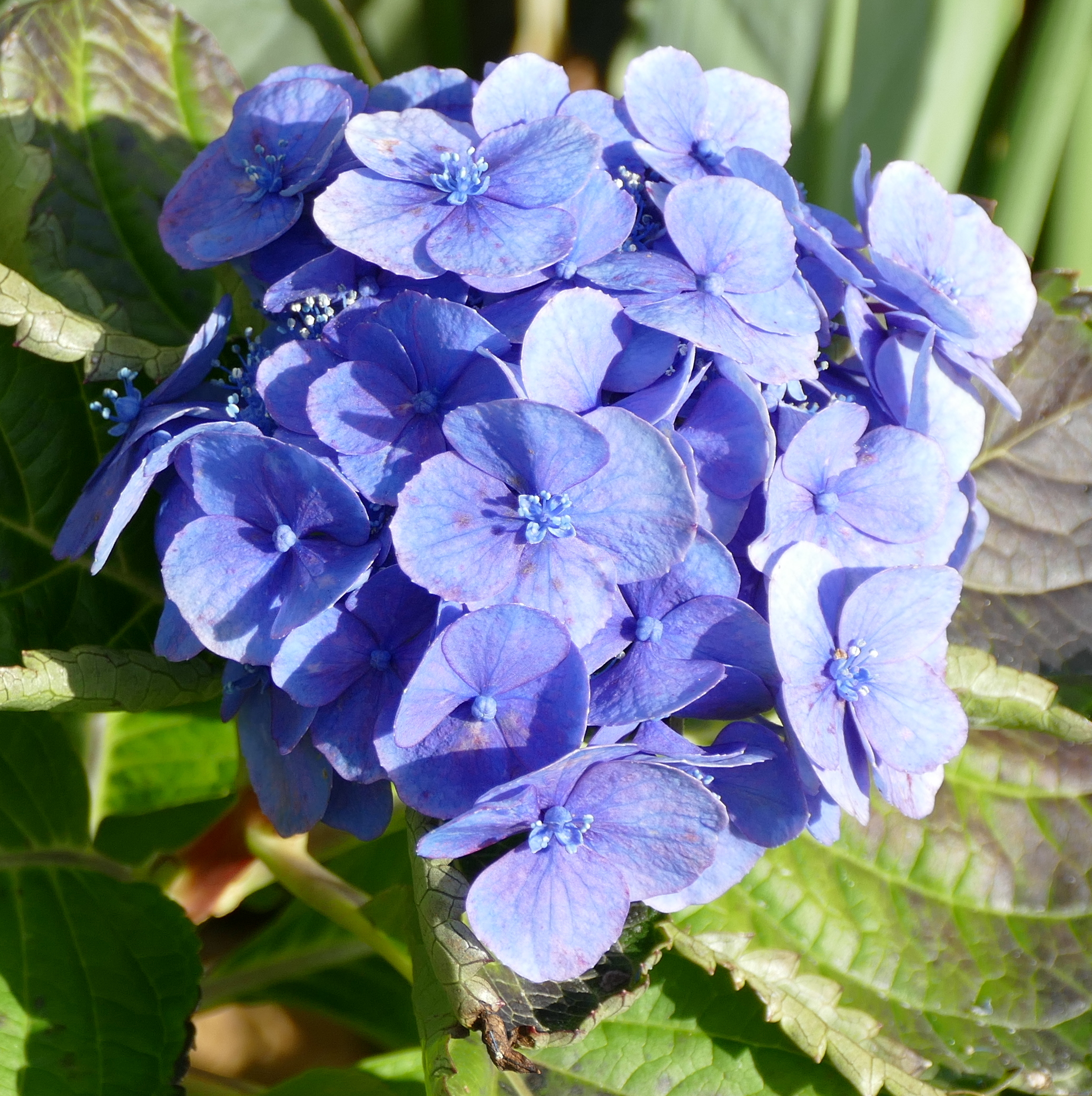
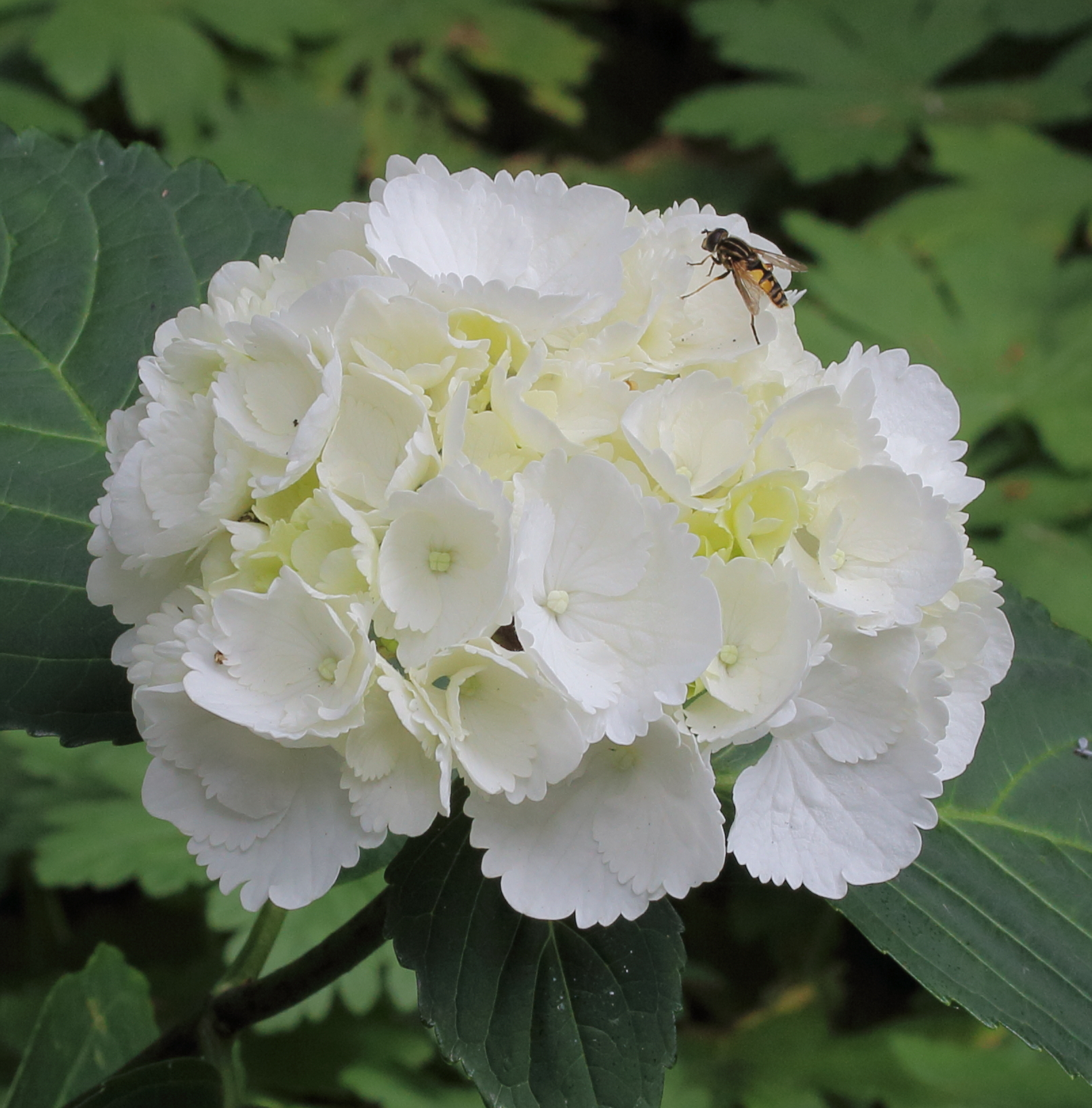
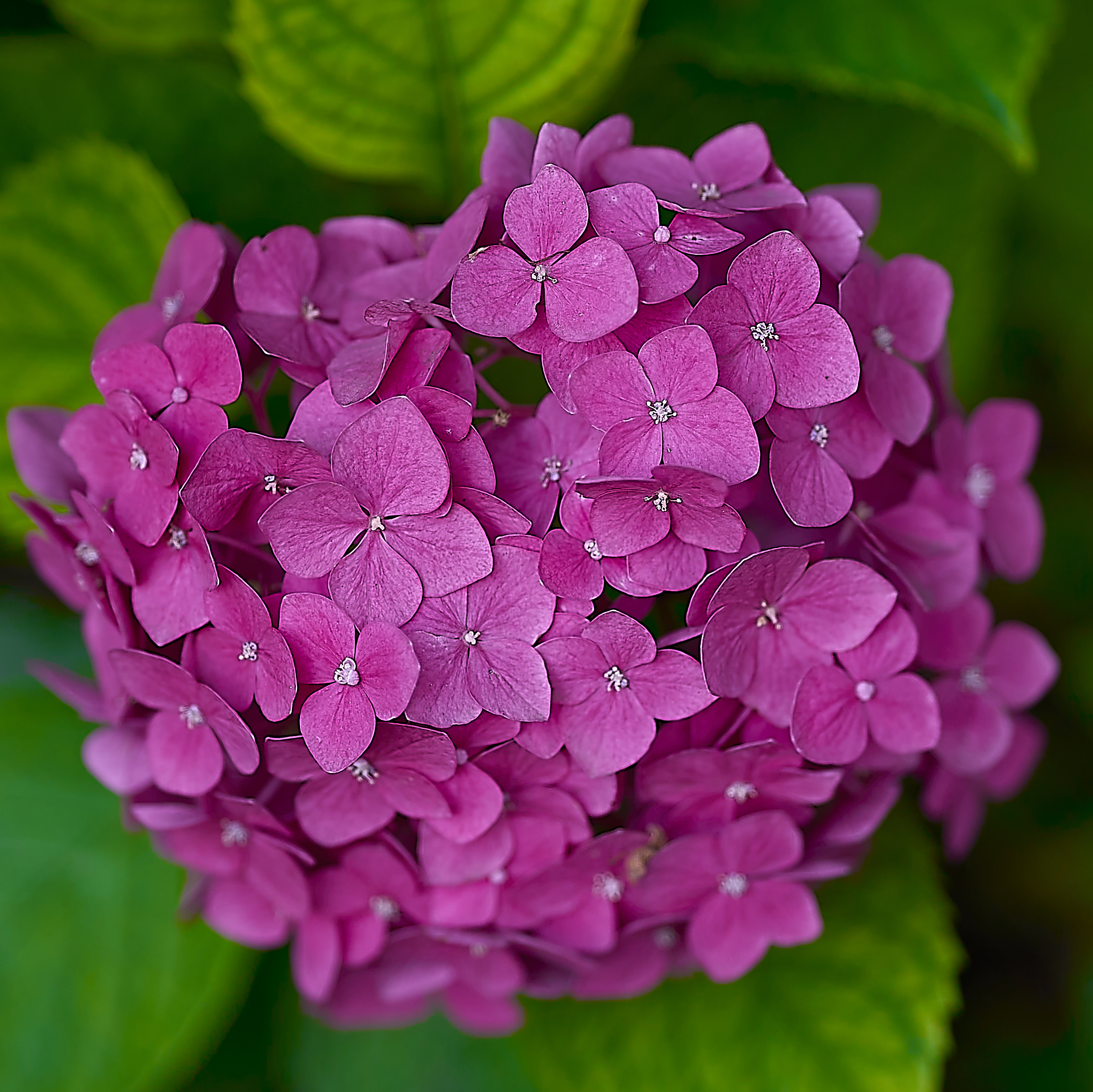
The flowers of the Bigleaf Hydrangea vary in color based on the pH of the soil they grow in.

High levels of aluminium occur near mining sites; small amounts of aluminium are released to the environment at the coal-fired power plants or incinerators. Aluminium in the air is washed out by the rain or normally settles down but small particles of aluminium remain in the air for a long time.

Acid rain is the main factor to mobilize aluminium from natural sources and the main reason for the environmental effects of aluminium. However, the main factor of presence of aluminium in saltwater and freshwater are the industrial processes that also release aluminium into air. Plants grown in acid soils can experience a variety of stresses including aluminium (Al), hydrogen (H), and/or manganese (Mn) toxicity, as well as nutrient deficiencies of calcium (Ca) and magnesium (Mg).

Aluminium toxicity is the most widespread problem in acid soils. Aluminium is present in all soils to varying degrees, but dissolved Al^{3+} is toxic to plants; Al^{3+} is most soluble at low pH; above pH 5.0, there is little Al in soluble form in most soils. Aluminium is not a plant nutrient, and as such, is not actively taken up by the plants, but enters plant roots passively through osmosis. Aluminium can exist in many different chemical forms and is a responsible agent for limiting plant growth in various parts of the world. Aluminium tolerance studies have been conducted in different plant species to see viable thresholds and concentrations exposed along with function upon exposure. Aluminium inhibits root growth. Lateral roots and root tips become thickened, roots lack fine branching, and root tips may turn brown. In the root, the initial effect of Al^{3+} is the inhibition of the expansion of the cells of the rhizodermis, leading to their rupture. Thereafter aluminium is known to interfere with many physiological processes including the uptake and transport of calcium and other essential nutrients, cell division, cell wall formation, and enzyme activity.

Proton (H^{+} ion) stress can also limit plant growth. The proton pump, H^{+}-ATPase, of the plasmalemma of root cells works to maintain the near-neutral pH of their cytoplasm. A high proton activity (pH within the range 3.0–4.0 for most plant species) in the external growth medium overcomes the capacity of the cell to maintain the cytoplasmic pH and growth shuts down.

In soils with a high content of manganese-containing minerals, Mn toxicity can become a problem at pH 5.6 and lower. Manganese, like aluminium, becomes increasingly soluble as pH drops, and Mn toxicity symptoms can be seen at pH levels below 5.6. Manganese is an essential plant nutrient, so plants transport Mn into leaves. Classic symptoms of Mn toxicity are crinkling or cupping of leaves.

=== Nutrient availability in relation to soil pH ===
Nutrient availability in relation to soil pH

As discussed above, aluminium toxicity has direct effects on plant growth. However, by limiting root growth, aluminium also reduces the availability of plant nutrients. Because roots are damaged, nutrient uptake is reduced, and deficiencies of the macronutrients (nitrogen, phosphorus, potassium, calcium and magnesium) are frequently encountered in very strongly acidic to ultra-acidic soils (pH<5.0). When aluminium levels increase in the soil, it decreases the pH levels. This does not allow for trees to take up water, meaning they cannot photosynthesize, leading them to die. The trees can also develop yellowish colour on their leaves and veins.

Molybdenum availability is increased at higher pH. This is because the molybdate ion is more strongly sorbed by clay particles at lower pH.

Zinc, iron, copper and manganese show decreased availability at higher pH (increased sorption at higher pH).

The effect of pH on phosphorus availability varies considerably, depending on soil conditions and the crop in question. The prevailing view in the 1940s and 1950s was that P availability was maximized near neutrality (soil pH 6.5–7.5), and decreased at higher and lower pH. Interactions of phosphorus with pH in the moderately to slightly acidic range (pH 5.5–6.5) are, however, far more complex than is suggested by this view. Laboratory tests, glasshouse trials and field trials have indicated that increases in pH within this range may increase, decrease, or have no effect on P availability to plants.

== Water availability in relation to soil pH ==
Strongly alkaline soils are sodic and dispersive, with slow infiltration, low hydraulic conductivity and poor available water capacity. Plant growth is severely restricted because aeration is poor when the soil is wet, while in dry conditions, plant-available water is rapidly depleted and the soils become hard and cloddy (high soil strength). The higher the pH in the soil, the less water available to be distributed to the plants and organisms that depend on it. An increased pH does not allow plants to uptake water as well as they normally would. This inhibits their ability to photosynthesize.

In strongly acidic soils, aluminium toxicity severely limits root growth, and moisture stress can occur even when the soil is relatively moist.

== Plant pH preferences ==
In general terms, different plant species are adapted to soils of different pH ranges. For many species, the suitable soil pH range is fairly well known. Online databases of plant characteristics, such as USDA PLANTS and Plants for a Future can be used to look up the suitable soil pH range of a wide range of plants. Documents like Ellenberg's indicator values for British plants can also be consulted.

However, a plant may be intolerant of a particular pH in some soils as a result of a particular mechanism, and that mechanism may not apply in other soils. For example, a soil low in molybdenum may not be suitable for soybean plants at pH 5.5, but soils with sufficient molybdenum allow optimal growth at that pH. Similarly, some calcifuges (plants intolerant of high-pH soils) can tolerate calcareous soils if sufficient phosphorus is supplied. Another confounding factor is that different varieties of the same species often have different suitable soil pH ranges. Plant breeders can use this to breed varieties that can tolerate conditions that are otherwise considered unsuitable for that species: examples are projects to breed aluminium-tolerant and manganese-tolerant varieties of cereal crops for food production in strongly acidic soils.

The table below gives suitable soil pH ranges for some widely cultivated plants as found in the USDA PLANTS Database. Some species (like Pinus radiata and Opuntia ficus-indica) tolerate only a narrow range in soil pH, whereas others (such as Vetiveria zizanioides) tolerate a very wide pH range.

Scientific name	Common name	pH range	
Scientific name	Common name	Minimum	Maximum
Chrysopogon zizanioides	vetiver grass	3.0	8.0
Pinus rigida	pitch pine	3.5	5.1
Rubus chamaemorus	cloudberry	4.0	5.2
Ananas comosus	pineapple	4.0	6.0
Coffea arabica	Arabian coffee	4.0	7.5
Rhododendron arborescens	smooth azalea	4.2	5.7
Pinus radiata	Monterey pine	4.5	5.2
Carya illinoinensis	pecan	4.5	7.5
Tamarindus indica	tamarind	4.5	8.0
Vaccinium corymbosum	highbush blueberry	4.7	7.5
Manihot esculenta	cassava	5.0	5.5
Morus alba	white mulberry	5.0	7.0
Malus	apple	5.0	7.5
Pinus sylvestris	Scots pine	5.0	7.5
Carica papaya	papaya	5.0	8.0
Cajanus cajan	pigeonpea	5.0	8.3
Pyrus communis	common pear	5.2	6.7
Solanum lycopersicum	garden tomato	5.5	7.0
Psidium guajava	guava	5.5	7.0
Nerium oleander	oleander	5.5	7.8
Punica granatum	pomegranate	6.0	6.9
Viola sororia	common blue violet	6.0	7.8
Caragana arborescens	Siberian peashrub	6.0	9.0
Cotoneaster integerrimus	cotoneaster	6.8	8.7
Opuntia ficus-indica	Barbary fig (pricklypear)	7.0	8.5

In natural or near-natural plant communities, the various pH preferences of plant species (or ecotypes) at least partly determine the composition and biodiversity of vegetation. While both very low and very high pH values are detrimental to plant growth, there is an increasing trend of plant biodiversity along the range from extremely acidic (pH 3.5) to strongly alkaline (pH 9) soils, i.e. there are more calcicole than calcifuge species, at least in terrestrial environments. Although widely reported and supported by experimental results, the observed increase of plant species richness with pH is still in need of a clearcut explanation. Competitive exclusion between plant species with overlapping pH ranges most probably contributes to the observed shifts of vegetation composition along pH gradients.

== pH effects on soil biota ==
Soil biota (soil microflora, soil animals) are sensitive to soil pH, either directly upon contact or after soil ingestion or indirectly through the various soil properties to which pH contributes (e.g. nutrient status, metal toxicity, humus form). According to the various physiological and behavioural adaptations of soil biota, the species composition of soil microbial and animal communities varies with soil pH. Along altitudinal gradients, changes in the species distribution of soil animal and microbial communities can be at least partly ascribed to variation in soil pH. The shift from toxic to non-toxic forms of aluminium around pH 5 marks the passage from acid-tolerance to acid-intolerance, with few changes in the species composition of soil communities above this threshold, even in calcareous soils. Soil animals exhibit distinct pH preferences when allowed to exert a choice along a range of pH values, explaining that various field distributions of soil organisms, motile microbes included, could at least partly result from active movement along pH gradients. Like for plants, competition between acido-tolerant and acido-intolerant soil-dwelling organisms was suspected to play a role in the shifts in species composition observed along pH ranges.

The opposition between acido-tolerance and acido-intolerance is commonly observed at species level within a genus or at genus level within a family, but it also occurs at much higher taxonomic rank, like between soil fungi and bacteria, here too with a strong involvement of competition. It has been suggested that soil organisms more tolerant of soil acidity, and thus living mainly in soils at pH less than 5, were more primitive than those intolerant of soil acidity. A cladistic analysis on the collembolan genus Willemia showed that tolerance to soil acidity was correlated with tolerance of other stress factors and that stress tolerance was an ancestral character in this genus. However, the generality of these findings remains to be established.

At low pH, the oxidative stress induced by aluminium (Al^{3+}) affects soil animals the body of which is not protected by the thick chitinous exoskeleton of arthropods, and thus are in more direct contact with the soil solution, e.g. protists, nematodes, rotifers (microfauna), enchytraeids (mesofauna) and earthworms (macrofauna).

Effects of pH on soil biota can be mediated by the various functional interactions of soil foodwebs. It has been shown experimentally that the collembolan Heteromurus nitidus, commonly living in soils at pH higher than 5, could be cultured in more acid soils provided that predators were absent. Its attraction to earthworm excreta (mucus, urine, faeces), mediated by ammonia emission, provides food and shelter within earthworm burrows in mull humus associated with less acid soils.

== Effects of soil biota on soil pH ==
Soil biota affect soil pH directly through excretion, and indirectly by acting on the physical environment. Many soil fungi, although not all of them, acidify the soil by excreting oxalic acid, which precipitates calcium, forming insoluble crystals of calcium oxalate and thus depriving the soil solution from this necessary element. On the opposite side, earthworms exert a buffering effect on soil pH through their excretion of mucus, endowed with amphoteric properties and exhibiting weak alkalinity (7.5 < pH < 8).

By mixing organic matter with mineral matter, in particular clay particles, and by adding mucus as a glue for some of them, burrowing soil animals, e.g. fossorial rodents, moles, earthworms, termites, some millipedes and fly larvae, contribute to decrease the natural acidity of raw organic matter, as observed in the formation of mull humus.

== Changing soil pH ==
=== Increasing pH of acidic soil ===
Finely ground agricultural lime is often applied to acid soils to increase soil pH (liming). The amount of limestone or chalk needed to change pH is determined by the mesh size of the lime (how finely it is ground) and the buffering capacity of the soil. A high mesh size (60 mesh = 0.25 mm; 100 mesh = 0.149 mm) indicates a finely ground lime that will react quickly with soil acidity. The buffering capacity of a soil depends on the clay content of the soil, the type of clay, and the amount of organic matter present, and may be related to the soil cation exchange capacity. Soils with high clay content will have a higher buffering capacity than soils with little clay, and soils with high organic matter will have a higher buffering capacity than those with low organic matter. Soils with higher buffering capacity require a greater amount of lime to achieve an equivalent change in pH. The buffering of soil pH is often directly related to the quantity of aluminium in soil solution and taking up exchange sites as part of the cation exchange capacity. This aluminium can be measured in a soil test in which it is extracted from the soil with a salt solution, and then is quantified with a laboratory analysis. Then, using the initial soil pH and the aluminium content, the amount of lime needed to raise the pH to a desired level can be calculated.

Amendments (soil conditioners) other than agricultural lime that can be used to increase the pH of soil include wood ash, industrial calcium oxide (burnt lime), magnesium oxide, basic slag (calcium silicate), silicate rock dust, and oyster shells. These products increase the pH of soils through various acid–base reactions during dissolution. Calcium silicate neutralizes active acidity in the soil by reacting with H^{+} ions to form monosilicic acid (H_{4}SiO_{4}), a neutral solute.

=== Decreasing the pH of alkaline soil ===
The pH of an alkaline soil can be reduced by adding acidifying agents or acidic organic materials. Elemental sulfur (90–99% S) has been used at application rates of 300–500 kg/ha (270–450 lb/acre): it slowly oxidises in the soil to form sulfuric acid. Acidifying fertilizers, such as ammonium sulfate, ammonium nitrate and urea, can help to reduce the pH of soil because ammonium oxidises to form nitric acid. Acidifying organic materials include peat or sphagnum peat moss.

However, in high-pH soils with a high calcium carbonate content (more than 2%), attempting to reduce the pH with acids can be very costly and ineffective. In such cases, it is often more efficient to add phosphorus, iron, manganese, copper, or zinc instead because deficiencies of these nutrients are the most common reasons for poor plant growth in calcareous soils.

== See also ==
- Acid mine drainage
- Acid sulfate soil
- Cation-exchange capacity
- Fertilizer
- Liming (soil)
- Organic horticulture
- Redox gradient
