= Burrowing snake =

Burrowing snake may refer to:

- Amerotyphlops brongersmianus, a harmless blind snake species found in South America
- Amerotyphlops trinitatus, a.k.a. the Trinidad burrowing snake, a harmless blind snake species found in Trinidad and Tobago
- Adelphicos nigrilatum, a harmless snake species found in Mexico
- Brazilian burrowing snake, Gomesophis brasiliensis, a harmless snake species found in Brazil
- Antaioserpens, a genus of burrowing snakes found in Australia
- Brachyurophis, a genus of burrowing snakes found in Australia
- Simoselaps, a genus of burrowing snakes found in Australia
- Adelphicos, a genus of burrowing snakes found in Central America

See also

- Burrowing asp, a genus of venomous snakes found in Africa and the Middle East
