= Parent rock =

Original rock substratum

In the Earth sciences, parent rock, or parent material is the original geologic material from which soil develops. It may consist of bedrock (such as sedimentary, igneous, or metamorphic rock) or unconsolidated deposits such as glacial, fluvial, or volcanic sediments.

The nature of the parent material strongly influences the physical and chemical characteristics of the resulting soil, for example, clay-rich soils may develop from mudstone or shale, while sandy soils often develop from the weathering of sandstone. In the context of metamorphic rocks, the original rock from which a metamorphism forms is called the protolith.

== See also ==
- Bedrock
- Regolith
- Floater
