= Microarthropods =

Size group of small invertebrates

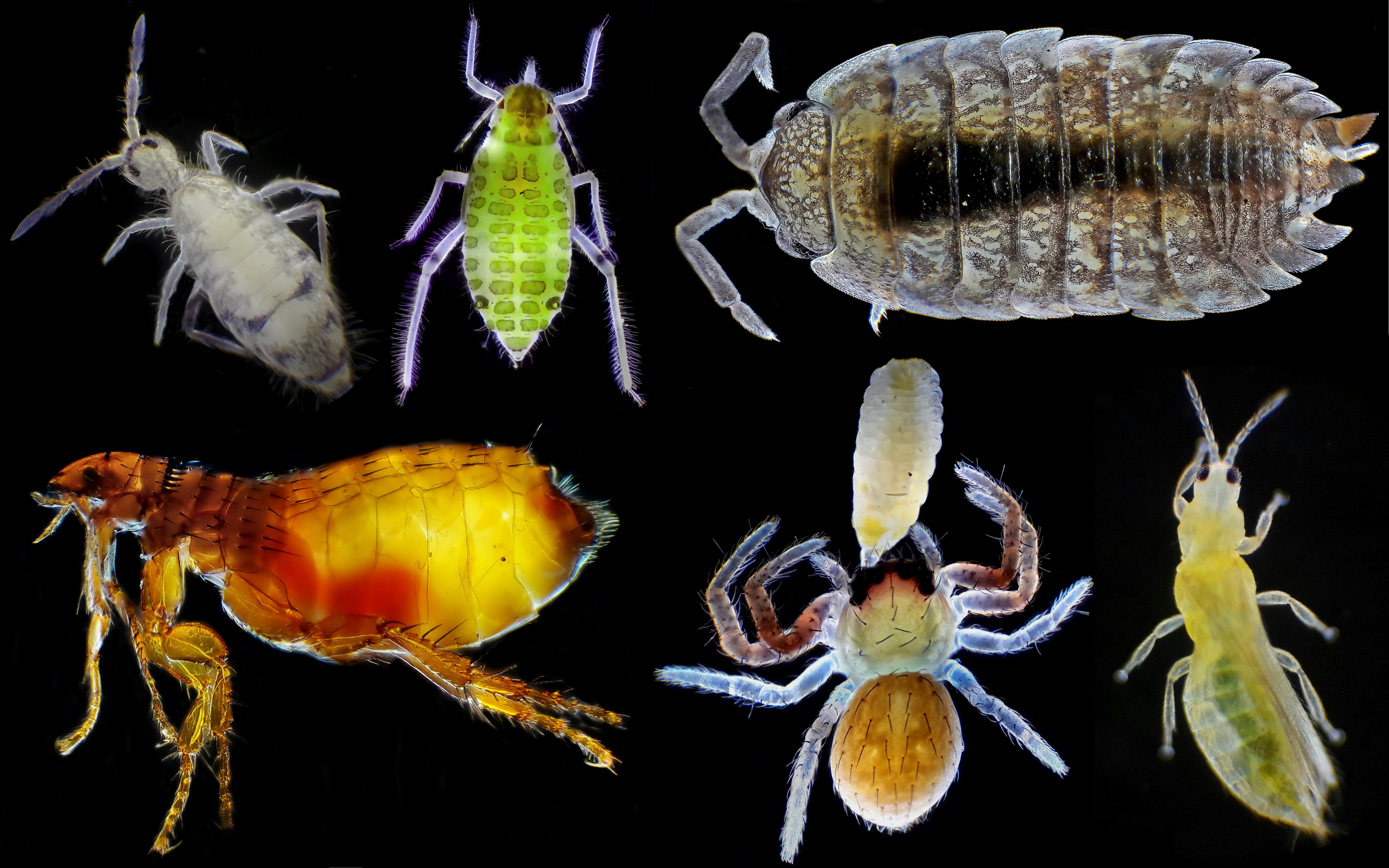
Microarthropods

Microarthropods (from Micro… and Arthropods) are a special size group of small invertebrates of the phylum arthropods. Their sizes (usually from one to several millimeters) determine their habitats (usually soils), ecological features and methods of study.

== Description ==
Microarthropods are able to move only within existing pores in the soil.

Microarthropods are a diverse, taxonomically separate group of small animals, including representatives of various classes and orders of arthropods. Here are their main characteristics and features:

Microarthropods include mainly the following groups:

- Soil and surface Collembola (or springtails)
- Soil mites: Oribatida, Mesostigmata, acariform mites and other small Arachnids
- Small centipedes
- Small insects and their larvae
- Small crustaceans.

Many species of microarthropods have not yet been described and require further study.

Sizes: from fractions of a millimeter to several millimeters.

The body, like all arthropods, is segmented (with jointed limbs).

Microarthropods are found almost everywhere, most often in fallen leaves, soil litter and upper soil layers. They play an important role in accelerating the decomposition of organic matter and forming the soil structure.

In water, they are part of the plankton or benthosa.

There are predatory and parasitic species.

== Significance ==
Microarthropods are an important and numerous group of organisms that play a key role in maintaining the balance of ecosystems.

Microarthropod communities are bioindicators of environmental assessment, as they are very sensitive to changes in ecosystems. Their study helps to better understand the processes occurring in nature and assess the state of the environment.

Microarthropods of soils (pedobionts) are studied by soil zoologists (collembologists, acarologists and others).

== Literature ==
- Chernova N.M., Chugunova M.N. Analysis of the spatial distribution of soil-dwelling microarthropods within a single plant association // Pedobiologia. 1967. Vol. 7. No. 1. P. 67-87.
- Ecology of forest soil microarthropods: collection of scientific papers / ed. N.M. Chernova. - Moscow: Nauka, 1988. - 134 p.
- Gobat J-M., Aragno M., Matthey W. The Living Soil: Fundamentals of Soil Science and Soil Biology. Science Pub, 2004. 602 p.
- Görres J.H., Amador J.A. Microarthropods: The soil fauna // Principles and Applications of Soil Microbiology (Third Edition), 2021.
