= Sorption =

Physical or chemical process by which one substance becomes attached to another

Gas–liquid absorption (a) and liquid–solid adsorption (b) mechanism. Blue spheres are solute molecules.

Sorption is a physical and chemical process by which one substance becomes attached to another. Specific cases of sorption are treated in the following articles:

Absorption
"the incorporation of a substance in one state into another of a different state" (e.g., liquids being absorbed by a solid or gases being absorbed by a liquid);
Adsorption
The physical adherence or bonding of ions and molecules onto the surface of another phase (e.g., reagents adsorbed to a solid catalyst surface);
Ion exchange
An exchange of ions between two electrolytes or between an electrolyte solution and a complex.

The reverse of sorption is desorption.

== Sorption rate ==
The adsorption and absorption rate of a diluted solute in gas or liquid solution to a surface or interface can be calculated using Fick's laws of diffusion.

== See also ==
- Sorption isotherm
