= Nitrogen crisis in the Netherlands =

Soil pollution crisis

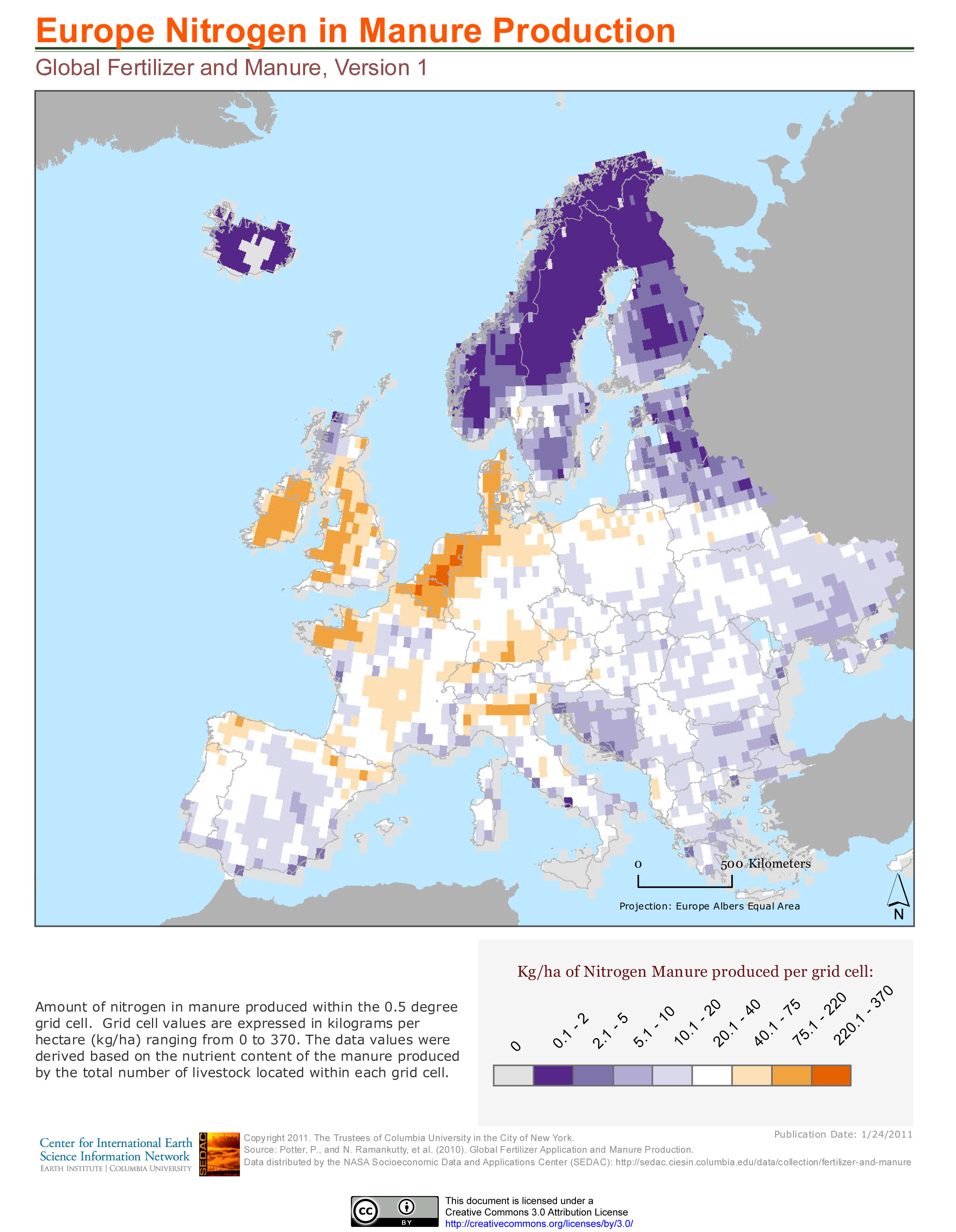
Per the CIESIN, nitrogen from manure production is a significant polluting agent in the Low Countries

The nitrogen crisis in the Netherlands (Dutch: stikstofcrisis) is an ecological and legal crisis that has been defined as such since 2019, following a ruling by the Administrative Jurisdiction Division of the Council of State.

== Background ==
Origin of nitrogen deposition in the Netherlands in 2018
1. Agriculture (46.0%)
2. Foreign sources (32.3%)
3. Households (6.10%)
4. Road traffic (6.10%)
5. International shipping (2.90%)
6. Other traffic (2.20%)
7. Ammonia from the sea (2.20%)
8. Industry (1.00%)
9. Other (construction, waste, energy, etc.) (1.20%)

Around 78% of the earth's atmosphere is made up of gaseous nitrogen (N_{2}). This naturally occurring gaseous form is fairly inert and does not pose an environmental problem. At the root of the nitrogen crisis is not N_{2} but other more reactive nitrogen compounds that are the result of human impact on the nitrogen cycle. In the Netherlands, the soil is burdened by very high deposition rates of reactive nitrogen compounds, in particular ammonia (NH_{3}) and nitrogen oxides (NO_{x}). Ammonia is released into the air from animal manure, nitrogen oxides are emitted by internal combustion engines, such as those in motor vehicles, aircraft and industry. Nitrogen compounds from fertilizers used in agriculture are also washed directly into ground water. The presence of nitrogen compounds in large quantities is a form of nutrient pollution and adversely affects the quality of soil, water, air, and nature through the process of eutrophication.

The Netherlands emits more nitrogen compounds per hectare than any other country in the EU by a long way, according to the Netherlands Organisation for Applied Scientific Research. 61 percent of these nitrogen compounds are produced by agriculture, with intensive livestock farming being the most important source of nitrogen pollution. In a sense, the nitrogen crisis is the successor to the acid rain problem of the 1980s. Acid rain is caused by the deposition of ammonia and nitrogen oxides, but also sulfur dioxide (SO_{2}). From 1980 to 2020, the emission of sulfur dioxide was reduced by 80%. The emission of nitrogen compounds was also reduced by 50%. The emission of nitrogen dioxide (NO_{2}) has been steadily decreasing ever since 1980. However, the reduction in the emission of ammonia came to a standstill around 2010, the last year of the fourth Balkenende cabinet.

In 2015, the Dutch government under the second Rutte cabinet launched a new program to reduce nitrogen pollution, the Integrated Approach to Nitrogen (Dutch: Programma Aanpak Stikstof, PAS).

== History ==
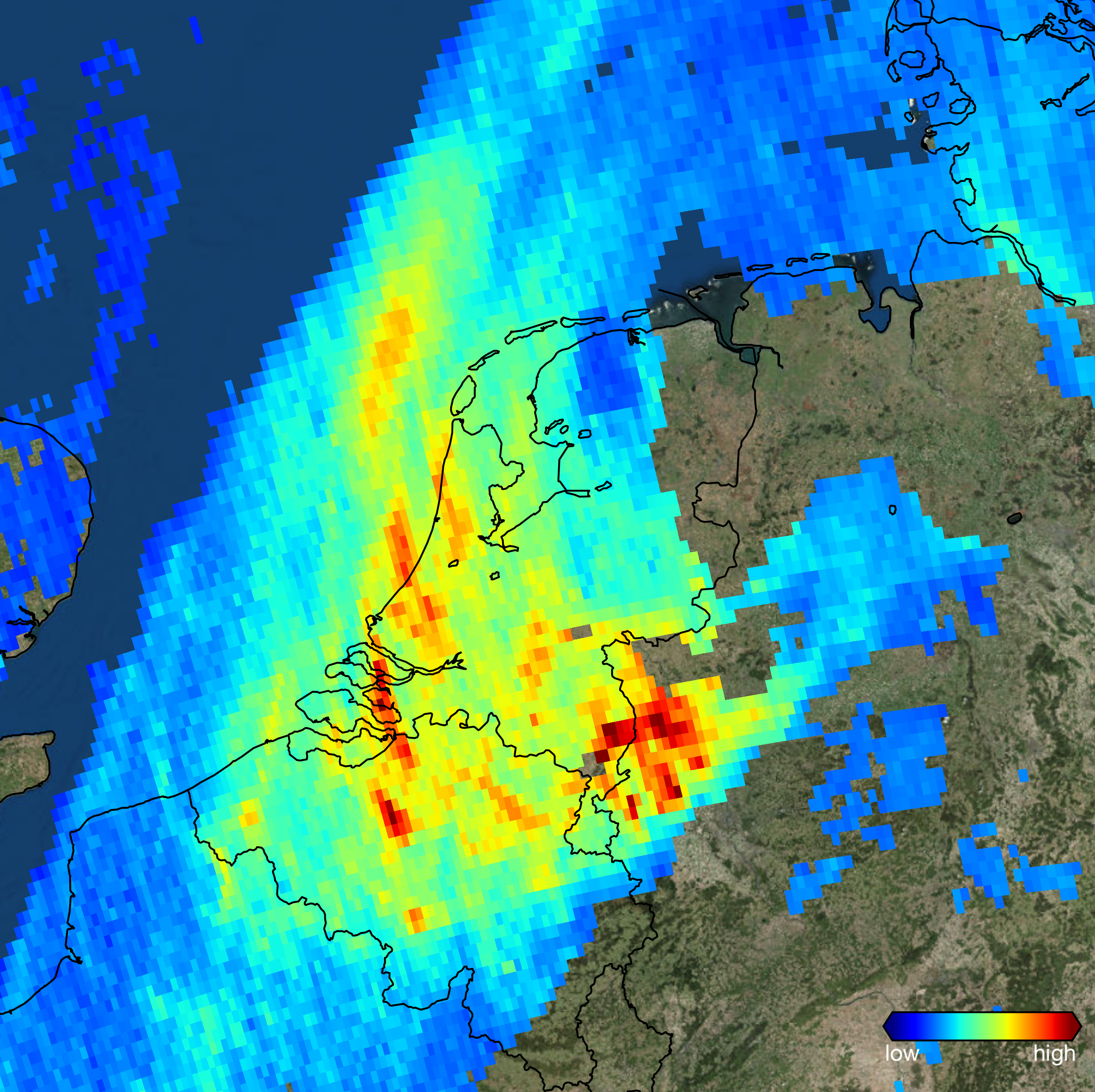
2017 Sentinel-5P satellite imagery of high levels of atmospheric nitrogen dioxide (NO_{2}) over the Low Countries

=== 2019 Court of State ruling ===
When the nitrogen crisis came to a head in 2019, it already had a long history, both legal and ecological. The first European standards were set as early as 1991. European Union member states are obliged to comply with the Habitats Directive, which states that a 'favourable conservation status' must be aimed for in Natura 2000 areas.

In May 2017, the Council of State submitted a number of preliminary questions to the European Court of Justice, which in November 2018 provided a further explanation of the relevant provisions of the Habitats Directive. On 29 May 2019, the Administrative Jurisdiction Division of the Council of State ruled on this basis that the government's use of the Integrated Approach to Nitrogen (PAS) was invalid when granting permits due to the anticipation of future reductions in nitrogen deposition. As a result, the PAS could no longer be used for granting nitrogen permits in the vicinity of Natura 2000 areas. This ruling led to the immediate suspension of various projects (mainly housing, which aggravated the ongoing Dutch housing shortage), and the government had to urgently seek solutions. Although nitrogen pollution had been an issue for many years, the Council of State's ruling promptly suspended an estimated 18,000 construction projects.

=== Later official recommendations and decisions ===
In June 2020, the Advisory Committee on the Nitrogen Problem under former Deputy Prime Minister Johan Remkes published a report titled Niet alles kan overal ("Not Everything Is Possible Everywhere") which recommended reducing nationwide emissions of NH_{3} and NO_{x} by 50% compared to 2019, for a long-term solution (up to 2030). The NH_{3} should be reduced even further in certain areas close to natural areas.

As of July 2021, construction projects could proceed without nitrogen testing under the so-called bouwvrijstelling ("construction exemption"). However, this exemption was overturned by the Council of State in November 2022, and a "protracted nitrogen crisis" continues.

In September 2022 the Ecologische Autoriteit was founded by the Dutch cabinet, to advise on plans made by the provinces from 2023 onwards to improve the quality of natural areas, especially that of nitrogen sensitive Natura 2000 sites.

=== Protests and political developments ===
In the wake of the 2019 ruling and related government policies, a sizeable farmers' protest movement arose, which saw livestock farmers using tractors to block major Dutch roads and occupy public spaces.

In response to these protests, the agrarian and right-wing populist political party Farmer–Citizen Movement (Dutch: BoerBurgerBeweging, BBB) was founded in October 2019. In the 2021 general election, it argued for the creation of a "Ministry of the Countryside" (Dutch: ministerie van Platteland) located at least 100 kilometers from The Hague and a removal of the ban on neonicotinoids. In addition, the party calls for right-to-farm laws, which would allow for farmers to have more say on expanding their agricultural activities, in response to local opposition to pig and goat farms over public health, environmental and agricultural concerns.

In 2023, the BBB received the most votes in the provincial elections and became the party with the largest number of seats in the Dutch Senate following the Senate election.

== See also ==
- Human impact on the nitrogen cycle
- Greenpeace v State of the Netherlands
- Environmental impact of agriculture
- Environmental skepticism
- Manure crisis in the Netherlands
