= Greenpeace v State of the Netherlands =

Dutch legal case (2025)

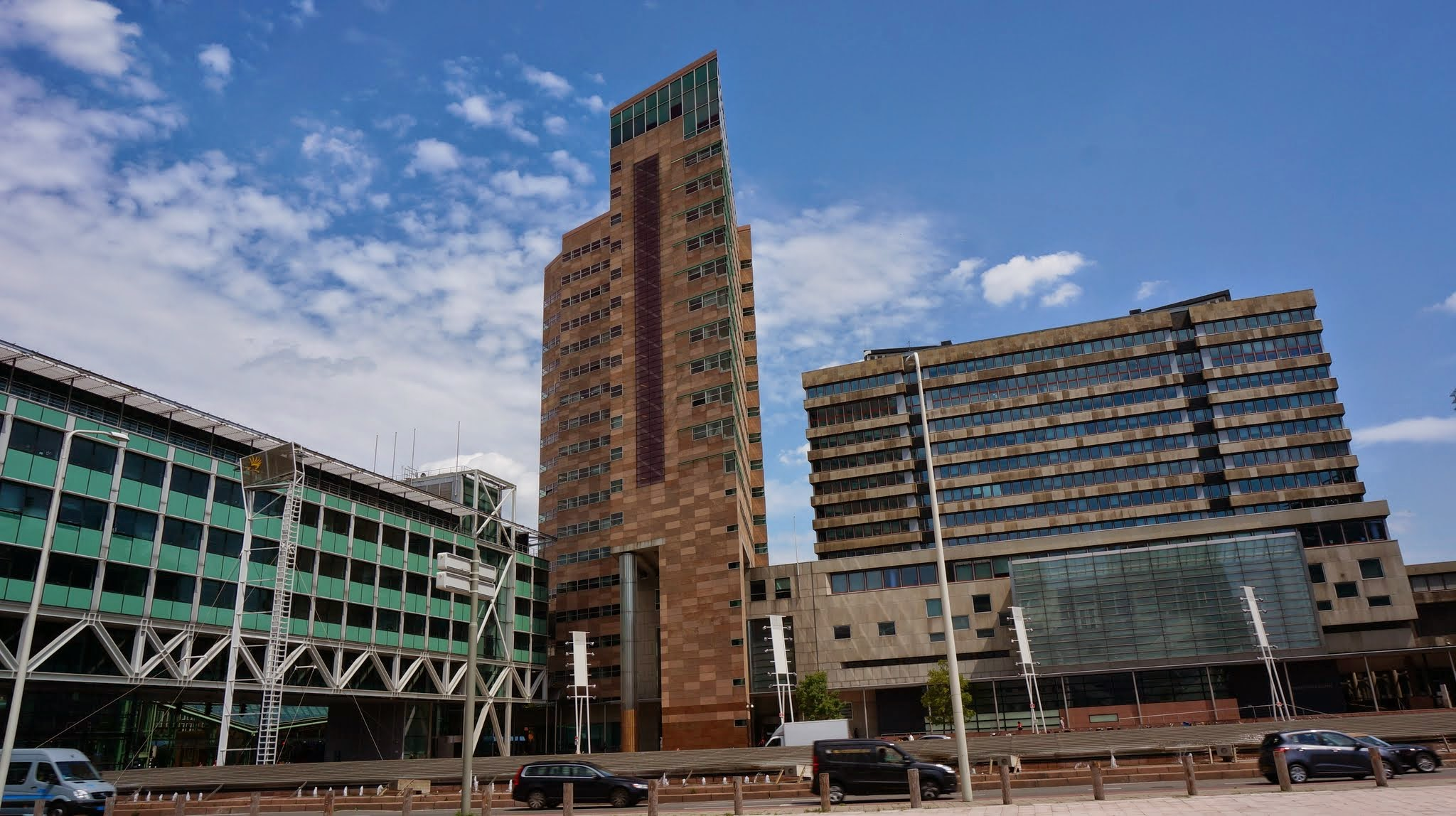
- Court building
- Court: District Court of The Hague
- Decided: 22 January 2025
- ECLI: ECLI:NL:RBDHA:2025:578

Court membership
- Judges sitting: Jerzy Luiten, Maarten van Laarschot, and Daan Glass

Greenpeace v State of the Netherlands (2025) is a environmental law case heard by the District Court of The Hague related to the government's adherence to nature protection commitments. It was brought by the Dutch branch of Greenpeace against the State of the Netherlands, arguing that the government's efforts to reduce nitrogen emissions were insufficient to adhere to its goals to protect nitrogen-sensitive nature in Natura 2000 reserves. In January 2025, the court ordered the government to take action to make sure 50% of such areas would no longer exceed the critical load for nitrogen deposition by 2030. The government was ordered to pay €10 million to Greenpeace in case it would fail to comply.

== Background and case ==
=== Legislation and injunction ===
The European Birds and Habitats Directives mandate the protection of flora and fauna species, and the Netherlands accordingly designated 162 nature reserves as part of the Natura 2000 network between 2008 and 2010. The Administrative Jurisdiction Division of the Council of State ruled in 2019 that the Dutch policy regarding nitrogen deposition was in violation of European legislation, prompting the nitrogen crisis. In response, the third Rutte cabinet, through the Nitrogen Reduction and Nature Improvement Act, committed to ensuring that deposition remain below the critical load in 40% of nitrogen-sensitive nature in Natura 2000 reserves by 2025 and in 50% of areas by 2030.

In July 2023, environmental organization Greenpeace filed a civil case in the District Court of The Hague against the Dutch government, as it believed that the plans of the fourth Rutte cabinet to tackle the nitrogen crisis were insufficient. It argued that more significant reductions in nitrogen deposition were required to prevent further deterioration of nature reserves and adhere to European legislation. In its case, Greenpeace demanded that nitrogen deposition would be brought back to below the critical load for all nitrogen-sensitive nature in reserves in a timely manner. In June 2024, the court ruled in a preliminary injunction that the government did not have to take additional emergency measures, but it noted that nitrogen-sensitive nature was in poor condition.

The fourth Rutte cabinet was succeeded by the Schoof cabinet in July 2024. Under agriculture minister Femke Wiersma of the Farmer–Citizen Movement (BBB), the new cabinet scrapped efforts to address the nitrogen crisis, while it was working on a new approach. Funding allocated to the issue had been reduced from €20 billion to €5 billion in the coalition agreement.

=== Proceedings and verdict ===
On 12 November 2024, the first day of hearings in the civil case, Greenpeace softened its initial demand, calling for 75% of nitrogen-sensitive nature in reserves to fall below the critical load by 2025, increasing to 90% by 2030. The organization demanded that the government pay a €100,000 penalty per day for failing to comply. State Advocate Edward Brans argued on behalf of the government that significant actions were being taken to address the nitrogen crisis and that the goals proposed by Greenpeace were unachievable. The National Institute for Public Health and the Environment had concluded that nitrogen emissions in the Netherlands would have to be reduced by 63% to meet the goals. Furthermore, he contended Greenpeace's assertion that points of no return exist after which nature cannot be restored.

The District Court of The Hague ruled on 22 January 2025 that the government should take additional action to adhere to its own commitment of critical load adherence for 50% of nitrogen-sensitive nature by 2030. It agreed with Greenpeace that the government's policy to combat nitrogen emissions was insufficient and resulted in ecological deterioration. The court was under the impression that the cabinet was slowing down its approach to tackle the nitrogen crisis, by reducing funding allocated to the issue. It ordered that the government pay €10 million to Greenpeace if the goal was not achieved. The verdict stated that such a fine was uncommon in cases where the government is the defendant, but the court found that the state had been culpable for failing to take sufficient measures for years. The government was to take immediate action, also in case it would appeal the judgment.

The court chose to not enforce the government's nitrogen goal for 2025 of having 40% of nitrogen-sensitive nature in reserves be below the critical load, calling it unachievable as only 28% was in compliance with the limit at the time. It also disagreed with Greenpeace about the existence of points of no return.

== Responses and aftermath ==
Andy Palmen, the executive director of Greenpeace Netherlands, referred to the verdict as a "celebration for nature", and he declared that it would finally bring clarity to society and businesses following the government's pushing forward of measures. Agriculture minister Femke Wiersma was disappointed by the ruling, and she stated that the cabinet would work on an approach to tackle the nitrogen crisis that considers the societal impact of measures. Most parties, both in the opposition and coalition, deferred to Wiersma to take additional action. However, the Party for Freedom (PVV) and Farmer–Citizen Movement (BBB), both part of the coalition, argued that measures and commitments on nitrogen should be relaxed. Caroline van der Plas, party leader of the BBB, defended Wiersma by blaming the issue on bad policies of previous cabinets.

Two months before the verdict, in December 2024, the Administrative Jurisdiction Division of the Council of State had ruled that unused nitrogen emission rights could no longer be allocated to other construction and expansion projects. New permits would be required instead, threatening widespread project delays. On 24 January 2025, in response to both rulings, Prime Minister Dick Schoof announced a ministerial committee on economy and nature restoration, aiming to deliver a plan within two months. It comprised twelve cabinet members of impacted ministries. Schoof declared that the Dutch economy could not come to a standstill and that the committee would not exclusively consider nature goals.
