= Critical load =

In the study of air pollution, a critical load is defined as "a quantitative estimate of an exposure to one or more pollutants below which significant harmful effects on specified sensitive elements of the environment do not occur according to present knowledge".

Air pollution research in relation to critical loads has focused on nitrogen and sulfur pollutants. After these pollutants are emitted into the atmosphere, they are subsequently deposited into ecosystems. Both sulfur and nitrogen deposition can acidify surface waters and soils. As added acidity lowers the pH of water, fish and invertebrate health are negatively impacted. Sulfur and nitrogen, as acidifying agents, may change soil nutrient content by removing calcium and releasing toxic aluminum, further impacting plants and animals. Nitrogen deposition can also act as a fertilizer in the environment and alter the competitive interactions of plants, thereby favoring the growth of some plant species and inhibiting others, potentially leading to changes in species composition and abundance. The deposition of nitrogen contributes to nutrient enrichment in freshwater, coastal, and estuarine ecosystems, which may cause toxic algal blooms, fish kills, and loss of biodiversity. Air pollutants impact essential ecosystem services such as air and water purification, decomposition and detoxification of waste materials, and climate regulation.

When deposition is greater than the critical load of a pollutant for a particular location, it is considered a critical load exceedance, meaning the biota are at increased risk of ecological harm. Some components of an ecosystem are more sensitive to deposition than others; therefore, critical loads can be developed for a variety of ecosystem components and responses, including (but not limited to) shifts in diatoms, increases in invasive grass species, changes in soil chemistry, decreased forest health, altered and reduced biodiversity, and lake and stream acidification.

The history, terminology, and approach used to calculate critical loads differ by region and country. The differences between approaches used by European countries and in the U.S. are discussed below.

== Europe ==
In European countries, critical loads and the similar concept of critical levels have been used extensively within the 1979 UN-ECE Convention on Long-Range Transboundary Air Pollution. As an example the 1999 Gothenburg protocol to the LRTAP convention takes into account acidification (of surface waters and soils), eutrophication of soils and ground-level ozone and the emissions of sulfur dioxide, ammonia, nitrogen oxide and non-methane volatile organic compounds (NMVOCs). For acidification and eutrophication the critical loads concept was used, whereas for ground-level ozone the critical levels were used instead.

To calculate a critical load, the target ecosystem must first be defined and in that ecosystem (e.g. a forest) a sensitive "element" must be identified (e.g. forest growth rate). The next step is to link the status of that element to some chemical criterion (e.g. the base cation to aluminium ratio, Bc/Al) and a critical limit (e.g. Bc/Al=1) which should not be violated. Finally, a mathematical model (e.g. the Simple Mass Balance model, SMB) needs to be created so that the deposition levels that result in the chemical criterion reaching exactly the critical limit can be calculated. That deposition level is called the critical load and the difference between the current deposition level and the critical load is called exceedance.

In the early days, critical loads were often calculated as a single value, e.g. critical load of acidity. Today a two-dimensional critical load function is often calculated, with the x-axis as N-deposition and the y-axis as S-deposition. The critical loads concept is a steady-state concept and that it therefore includes no information whatsoever regarding how long it takes before effects are visible. A simplified illustration of dynamic aspects is the target load function, which is the load at which the chemical criterion recovers before a chosen year, the target year. Thus, for target years in the near future the target load function is lower than the critical load and for target years in the distant future the target load function approaches the critical load function.

Calculating critical load functions and target load functions include several simplifications and thus can be viewed as a risk concept: The higher the exceedance the higher the risk for adverse effects and there is a certain risk that zero exceedance will still lead to adverse effects.

== United States ==
In the U.S., while various entities were discussing critical loads prior to 2000, efforts were independent and disjointed. However, in 2010, following a series of critical loads workshops from 2003 to 2005 and an ad hoc committee established in 2006, national efforts were unified through the development of the Critical Loads of Atmospheric Deposition (CLAD) Science Committee as part of the National Atmospheric Deposition Program (NADP). CLAD is a multi-agency group consisting of federal and state government agencies, non-governmental organizations, environmental research organizations, and universities. The goals of CLAD are to: facilitate sharing of technical information on critical loads topics within a broad multi-agency/entity audience, fill gaps in critical loads development in the U.S., provide consistency in development and use of critical loads in the U.S., and promote understanding of critical loads approaches through development of outreach and communications materials.

Federal Land Managers, such as the National Park Service, U.S. Forest Service, and U.S. Fish and Wildlife Service, use critical loads to: identify resources at risk, focus research and monitoring efforts, inform planning and other land management activities, evaluate potential impacts of emission increases, and develop pollution reduction strategies. The U.S. Environmental Protection Agency is expanding use of critical loads for assessments and policy development, including consideration of critical loads when setting National Ambient Air Quality Standards.

The U.S. has adopted two approaches for creating critical loads: empirical and steady-state mass balance critical loads. Empirical critical loads are derived based on observations of ecosystem responses (such as changes in plant diversity, soil nutrient levels, or fish health) to specific deposition levels. These relationships are created using dose-response studies or by measuring ecosystem responses to increasing gradients of deposition over space or time. Steady-state mass balance critical loads are derived from mathematical mass-balance models under assumed or modeled equilibrium conditions. A steady-state condition may be achieved far into the future. The models used to determine steady-state critical loads vary in complexity with regard to process representation but can include water and soil chemistry, mineral soil weathering rates, deposition data, and ecological response data.

== Asia ==
In Asia, both empirical and steady-state mass balance approaches have been used to estimate critical loads. Empirical critical loads were simply determined as the deposition levels with reported field occurrence of detrimental ecological effects. The steady-state mass balance model calculates the critical load of an ecosystem over the long-term by defining acceptable values for elements leaching out of the ecosystem.

Although empirical nitrogen critical loads have been well summarized for Europe and the United States, large uncertainties still exist in Asia due to very limited and short-term experimental studies by using relatively high levels of nitrogen application. In regions (e.g., eastern and southern China) where historical nitrogen deposition has already been very high and perhaps even higher than the actual critical load, experimental studies may fail to quantify the critical loads because substantial ecosystem changes had already occurred. Moreover, the values of the critical loads can vary remarkably when based on different biological or chemical response of an ecosystem, such as physiological variation, reduced biodiversity, elevated nitrate leaching, and changes in soil microorganisms. Empirical critical loads have been assessed for some forests and grasslands in China, but the values for many other ecosystems remain unassessed. With more emerging field experiments, critical loads will be better estimated in the near future.

In South and East Asia, comprising China, Korea, Japan, the Philippines, Indo-China, Indonesia, and the Indian subcontinent, critical loads were first computed and mapped as part of the impact module of the Asian version of the Regional Air pollution INformation and Simulation model (RAINS-Asia) based on the steady-state mass balance approach. Thereafter, critical loads with higher resolution were calculated in many Asian countries such as Japan, Russia, South Korea, India, and China. Although similar methods were applied in Asia as in Europe, the steady state mass balance approach has been improved by considering base cation deposition. Steady-state mass balance critical loads have been used to designate Acid Rain Control Zones and Sulphur Dioxide Pollution Control Zones in China. In the near future, critical loads will be more widely applied to guide emission abatement strategies.
