= National Atmospheric Deposition Program =

The National Atmospheric Deposition Program (NADP) is a Cooperative Research Support Program of the State Agricultural Experiment Stations (NRSP-3). Housed at the Wisconsin State Laboratory of Hygiene at the University of Wisconsin–Madison, the NADP is a collaborative effort between many different groups, such as: Federal, state, tribal, local governmental agencies, educational institutions, private companies, and non-governmental agencies. These organizations work together in order to operate monitoring sites and report deposition data. The NADP provides free access to all of its data, including seasonal and annual averages, trend plots, deposition maps, reports, manuals, and educational brochures.

== Overview ==
- Established: 1977
- Number of sites: ~350 different site locations
- Numbers of users: >37,000

== History ==
=== Evolution ===
The National Atmospheric Deposition Program, or NADP, was initiated by the State Agricultural Experiment Station in 1977 to monitor the effects of atmospheric deposition on crops, rangelands, forests, surface waters, and other natural and cultural resources. The initial goal was to provide regional data for the deposition of acids, nutrients, and base cations (including temporal trends/amounts and geographic distributions).

In 1978, the first NADP sites began collecting weekly precipitation samples. In the early 1980s, the National Acid Precipitation Assessment Program (NAPAP) was established, and began to work in collaboration with NADP in order to sustain a long term, quality-assured precipitation monitoring network. This unification brought on a major expansion as well as newfound federal agency support. Today, the NADP National Trends Network (NTN) has more than 250 sites.

In response to emerging issues, the NADP established an additional two networks in the 1990s: The Atmospheric Integrated Research Monitoring Network (AIRMoN), which collected daily samples at five sites, and the Mercury Deposition Network (MDN), which has more than 80 sites (six of which are located in Canada). The MDN collects wet deposition data for both total and methyl mercury in precipitation.

In 2009, the Atmospheric Mercury Network (AMNet) was formed as a fourth network, and as a subset of some MDN sites. The network uses continuous automatic measurement systems to monitor gaseous and particulate concentrations of atmospheric mercury. The Ammonia Monitoring Network (AMoN) was added as a fifth network in October 2010, and it currently has more than 100 sites. AMoN monitors ammonia gas concentrations across the United States to provide consistent and lasting data. The Mercury Litterfall Network (MLN) was approved as the sixth network in 2021 with 22 sites. MLN provides estimates of mercury dry deposition in forested landscapes using passive collectors.

=== History of the National Acid Precipitation Assessment Program (NAPAP) ===
The National Acid Precipitation Assessment Program (NAPAP) was a cooperative federal program that was first authorized in 1981 in order to coordinate acid rain research and report those findings to the U.S. Congress. The research, monitoring, and assessment efforts of NAPAP, and other groups in the 1980s, culminated in Title IV of the 1990 Clean Air Act Amendments (CAAA), also known as the Acid Deposition Control Program. Title IX of the CAAA reauthorized NAPAP to conduct acid rain research and monitoring, and to periodically assess the costs, benefits, and effectiveness of Title IV. The NAPAP member agencies were the U.S. Environmental Protection Agency, the U.S. Department of Energy, the U.S. Department of Agriculture, the U.S. Department of Interior, the National Aeronautics and Space Administration, and the National Oceanic and Atmospheric Administration.

The NAPAP published a total of four reports: 1991 (multiple volumes), 1998, 2005, and 2011. The Program was able to describe and document strong reductions in sulfur dioxide and nitrogen oxide emissions, as well as the resulting atmospheric deposition from 1980 to 2010 as various elements of the CAAA were implemented. The NAPAP officially ended with publication of the last report in 2011. To reflect the federal NAPAP role in the NADP, the network name was changed to NADP National Trends Network (NTN)

== Organization ==
=== Governance ===
The organizational structure of the NADP follows the State Agricultural Experiment Station Guidelines for Multi-State Research Activities. This framework allows any individual or institution to participate in any segment of NADP, whether it be the monitoring or the research aspect of atmospheric deposition. NADP is managed by two groups. The first being Program Management, which is largely a volunteer group made up of site sponsors and supervisors, policy experts from several agencies (at the federal, state, and local levels), scientists and research specialists, and anyone with an interest in atmospheric deposition. Program management is organized through an Executive Committee, Technical Subcommittees, several advisory subcommittees, science subcommittees, and ad hoc groups. The second group is Program Operations, which is managed by a professional staff housed at the Wisconsin State Laboratory of Hygiene at the University of Wisconsin-Madison. The Program Office oversees day to day tasks, including coordinating with the Executive Committee, the individual monitoring networks, the analytical laboratories, the External Quality Assurance Program, and the Network Equipment Depot.

=== Committees ===
The NADP is governed by an elected and rotating Executive Committee (8 members). Currently, there are two standing Subcommittees, three standing Advisory Committees, and four Science Committees (highlighted below) that contribute continuous, scheduled suggestions to the Executive Committee. Ad hoc groups and the Program Office also supply crucial input to the Executive Committee.

The Executive Committee (EC) is responsible for considering and, if approved, executing decisions which are often based on the suggestions made by the subcommittees, advisory committees, science committees, and ad hoc groups. In addition, the EC is accountable for financial decisions and securing a balanced, stable, and ongoing program. There are eight voting members, as well as numerous non-voting members, that make decisions and appoint responsibilities to the subcommittees.

The two standing Technical Subcommittees, Education and Outreach Subcommittee (EOS) (formally the Ecological Response and Outreach Subcommittee) and Network Operations Subcommittee (NOS), provide the technical support necessary to promote the goals of NADP. EOS maintains a platform to coordinate outreach and education activities among the network and scientific subcommittees. With approval and recommendation from the Executive Committee, EOS will provide guidance for outreach efforts and educational materials to the Program Office. EOS will provide a forum to enable communication of outreach and education needs, goals and activities of the subcommittees and networks. The goal is to enhance efficiency in messaging and reaching new audiences. The NOS focuses on equipment, research, sampling methods, collection sites, and the evaluation of the issues that arise from these components.

The three advisory subcommittees include the Budget Advisory Committee (BAC), Quality Assurance Advisory Group (QAAG), and Data Management Advisory Group (DMAG). The role of the BAC is to advise the EC with suggestions pertaining to the budget, and to outline financial planning for current and future years. The QAAG is in charge of ensuring quality management in all aspects of NADP, including the Program Office, networks, and laboratories. To do so, they provide recommendations for manuals and procedures to the EC. The DMAG counsels the EC in data management by reviewing data reports and formats in order to ensure that they are in line with the correct protocols.

The science committees do not directly advise NADP networks, but they are closely affiliated. They assess major atmospheric deposition concerns and track scientific interest and participation. The first scientific committee was the Critical Loads of Atmospheric Deposition (CLAD), and the second was the Total Deposition Science Committee (TDep). CLAD and TDep were approved by the EC in 2010 and 2011, respectively. The goal of the CLAD is to provide a forum, across all levels of government and industry, that encourages the use and discussion of technical information and critical load science. TDep seeks to evaluate pressing issues of atmospheric deposition via a collaboration between a wide range of groups. TDep also aims to improve the ability to measure and model wet and dry deposition. To do so, they are working to advance the techniques and procedures which are used to estimate deposition of sulfur, nitrogen, and mercury. In October 2017, the Aeroallergen Monitoring Science Committee (AMSC) was added as the third science committee. AMSC seeks to utilize emerging technologies to advance the science of aeroallergen monitoring, enhance the understanding of quality data collection and evaluation methods, and provide lasting data for national networks. A fourth science committee, the Mercury in the Environment and Links to Deposition Science Committee (MELD), was formed in 2020 to improve our understanding of atmospherically-derived mercury sources, pathways, processes, and effects on the environment.

All NADP operations are administered at the NADP Program Office, which is currently located at the Wisconsin State Laboratory of Hygiene at the University of Wisconsin–Madison. The five main functions of the Program Office are network administration, management, meetings and trainings, data and publications, and quality assurance and management.

Network administration involves overseeing the endeavors of all five networks, managing sample analysis, and coordinating data storage and user availability. These functions are executed from the two analytical laboratories housed at WSLH: The Central Analytical Lab (CAL), which analyses samples from the NTN and AMoN networks, and the Mercury (Hg) Analytical Laboratory (HAL). The HAL was previously housed at Eurofins Frontier Global Sciences, Inc. in Bothell, Washington. In May 2023, the CAL and the HAL were renamed the NADP Analytical Laboratory (NAL). In addition, the Network Equipment Depot, located at the WSLH, provides spare parts for NADP field equipment and troubleshoots site operation problems.

=== Cooperating agencies ===
More than 80 sponsors support the NADP: Private companies and other non-governmental organizations, universities, local and state government agencies (i.e. state agricultural experiment stations), national laboratories, Native American environmental organizations, Canadian government agencies, the National Oceanic and Atmospheric Administration, the U.S. Environmental Protection Agency, the U.S. Geological Survey, the National Park Service, the U.S. Fish & Wildlife Service, the Bureau of Land Management, the U.S. Forest Service, the U.S. Department of Agriculture-Agricultural Research Service, the National Science Foundation, and the U.S. Department of Energy.

== Networks ==
=== NTN ===
The NTN has over 250 sites that focus on wet deposition chemistry by collecting weekly precipitation samples nationwide. The samples are sent to the NADP Analytical Laboratory (NAL) at the Wisconsin State Lab of Hygiene for analysis and are then used to determine geographic distribution and annual trends. The sample collection and handling methods follow strict clean-handling procedures in order to ensure accurate results. The analytes monitored are: Free acidity (H^{+} as pH), conductance, calcium (Ca^{2+}), magnesium (Mg^{2+}), sodium (Na^{+}), potassium (K^{+}), sulfate (SO_{4}^{2-}), nitrate (NO_{3}^{−}), chloride (Cl^{−}), and ammonium (NH_{4}^{+}). The NAL also measures orthophosphate, but only for quality assurance as an indicator of sample contamination.

=== MDN ===
The MDN measures total mercury concentrations on a weekly basis (methyl mercury is measured monthly at some sites), which provides wet deposition data for surface waters and other waterways. The goal is to deliver accurate information that allows researchers to evaluate the linkage between mercury and health, which is strengthened by its large spatial and temporal footprint.

=== AMNet ===
The AMNet consists of approximately 8 sites across the U.S. and Taiwan. The function of these sites is to measure ambient air concentrations of gaseous elemental mercury (GEM). This network works to monitor and report atmospheric mercury that causes dry and total deposition of mercury at select MDN sites. AMNet produces high-resolution data to determine atmospheric mercury trends and models, the ecological consequences of mercury discharging sources, and how to adequately control mercury levels. In May 2025 speciation measurements of gaseous oxidized mercury (GOM) and particulate bound mercury (PBM_{2.5}) were discontinued.

=== AMoN ===
The AMoN measures ambient ammonia gas concentrations over a two-week period via a Radiello®-passive sampler, which is a simple diffusive sampler that offers higher capacity and faster sampling rates than other devices. Therefore, AMoN can provide reliable data to aid in meeting air quality policies and administration needs. AMoN collects data biweekly to determine the spatial variability and seasonality of ammonia concentrations.

=== MLN ===
The MLN can provide an important component of mercury dry deposition to a forested landscape. The importance of litterfall mercury data for quantifying atmospheric mercury deposition to forests was demonstrated with studies at NADP sites in the eastern USA from 2007-2009 and 2007 to 2014.

== Closed Networks ==
=== AIRMoN ===
The AIRMoN sites were primarily used to assess the impacts of emission changes such as potential effects from new sources, federal Clean Air Act controls, and source-receptor relationships in atmospheric models. The network measured the same contaminants as the NTN, but sampling occurred daily during precipitation to provide greater temporal resolution. This consistent, high-resolution sampling improved the researchers’ ability to evaluate the data and, therefore, provide reliable results. The network was discontinued in September 2019.

== Products ==
=== Tabular data products ===
i.	NTN data
ii.	MDN data
iii.	AIRMoN data
iv.	AMNet data
v.	AMoN data
vi.	MLN data

=== Reports ===
- Brochures
- Annual Data Summaries
- Quality Assurance Reports
- CLAD Science Committee Reports
- TDep Science Committee Reports
- AMSC Study Plan
- MELD Science Committee Reports

=== Other helpful sites ===
- Rocky Mountain Research Station - Air, soil, and water resources and quality
- NRSP3: The National Atmospheric Deposition Program (NADP)

=== Standard Operating Procedures (SOP) ===
Accurate and consistent measurement of gases and deposition at every monitoring site is of the utmost importance to the NADP. This is accomplished, in part, by ensuring that all sites adhere to specific standard operating procedures. This provides consistent methodology at all sites within the networks. The SOPs can be viewed here:

- http://nadp.slh.wisc.edu/siteops/

=== Other Deposition Monitoring Groups ===
- Acid Deposition Monitoring Program in East Asia (EANET)
- Canadian Air and Precipitation Monitoring Network (CAPMoN)
- Clean Air Status and Trends Network (CASTNET)
- Great Lakes National Program Office (GLNPO)
- Asia-Pacific Mercury Monitoring Network (APMMN)
