= Fishless cycling =

Method for maturing aquarium ecosystems

Fishless cycling is a form of "maturing" an aquarium. The goal of the process is to establish a robust colony of nitrifiers, with the ammonia source provided to allow nitrifiers ('beneficial bacteria,' although nitrifiers can also be archaea) to grow and reproduce coming from non-fish sources, hence 'fishless.' Fishless cycling can reduce the chance of fish loss resulting from insufficient populations of nitrifiers.

== Process ==
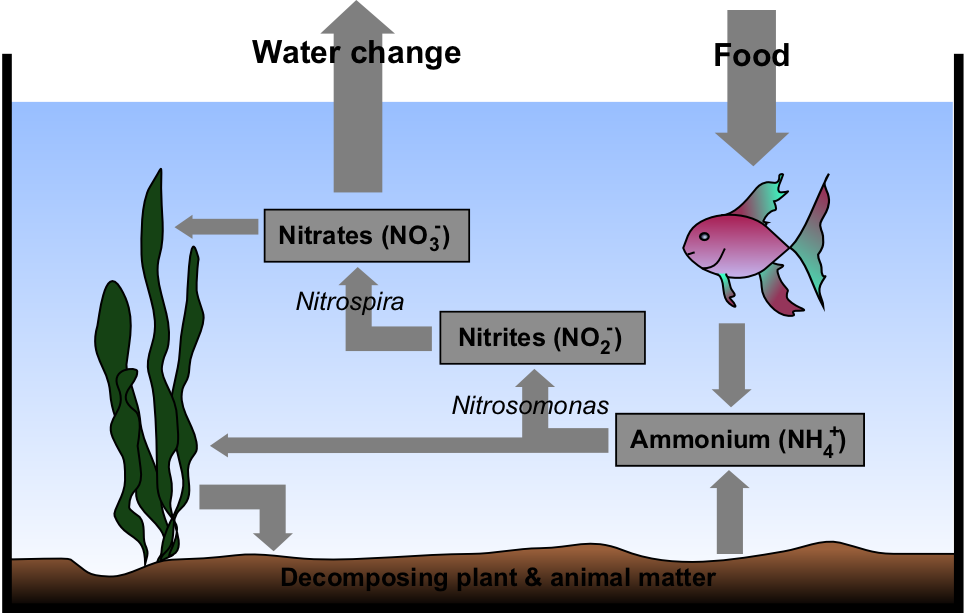
The nitrogen cycle in an aquarium

Fishless cycling can be instant or take a long time, up to six months in some reported cases. During this time, the aquarist provides an ammonia source for developing the nitrifier colony. Nitrifiers in the aquarium grow on all surfaces, particularly in areas of high water flow and high surface area, such as the filter. Allowing ammonia to be converted to nitrite and onto the less harmful nitrate minimizes stress and injury to aquarium fish. 'Cycling' is not identical to the nitrogen cycle, as it is specifically the process of establishing nitrification; not the other parts of the nitrogen cycle.

Cycling can be sped up via specific methodologies. Seeding the aquarium with nitrifiers, either from established biomedia, or a biological booster product can help. However, not all products have been found to work, or are even suitable for cycling. Commonly used products include FritzZyme TurboStart 700, the lesser concentrated FritzZyme 7, and Tetra SafeStart. Tetra SafeStart in particular have been studied by scientists and confirmed to accelerate the cycling process. The same study found Seachem Stability, API QuickStart, Imagitarium Biological Booster, and Fluval Cycle to perform no better than using no products, at least over the first 14 days. Conventional wisdom suggests increasing pH and temperature can help, however this is not always true. Different nitrifiers are adapted to different pH and temperatures, and some actually prefer lower pH/temperature. For example, a freshwater Nitrotoga species has an optimal pH of 6.8 and temperature of 22°C.

The ammonia source can be 'pure' ammonia or fish food, however using 'pure' ammonia is superior.

== Advantages ==
The most significant advantage of fishless cycling is that it can reduce fish loss due to ammonia and nitrite spikes. Fish loss can be very discouraging for beginners of fish keeping, so indirectly, fishless cycling can also help beginners get a good start.

Cycling aquariums using feeder fish is risky, because it infects the aquarium with any disease or parasite they happen to have. Fish raised as feeders do not get the same degree of care as non-feeders. Fishless cycling avoids this potential problem.

Fishless cycling also allows the aquarium to be completely stocked from the moment it is cycled if the aquarium can handle a high enough concentration of ammonia. This means that for large aquariums, where fish must be added in several batches, fishless cycling is faster than cycling with fish. It can also be extremely useful when the fish keeper plan to stock a tank full of territorial aggressive fish, such as African cichlids, where the later added fish can be at a disadvantage. However, care in adding ammonia for fishless cycling must be used, too high of an ammonium concentration can kill nitrifiers.

== Disadvantages ==
- Phosphates are often created as byproducts when decaying fish food is the source of ammonia.
- It might cost more than other methods to cycle the tank, if you include all the cost of the water test kit, pure ammonia, and biological boosters.
- A prolonged waiting period before stocking the aquarium.

== See also ==
- Fishkeeping
