= Human impact on the nitrogen cycle =

Environmental impact of agricultural and industrial nitrogen

The nitrogen cycle in a soil-plant system. One potential pathway: N is fixed by microbes into organic compounds, which are mineralized (i.e. ammonification) and then oxidized to inorganic forms (i.e. nitrification) that are assimilated by plants (NO_{3}^{−}). NO_{3}^{−} may also be denitrified by bacteria, producing N_{2}, NO_{x}, and N_{2}O.

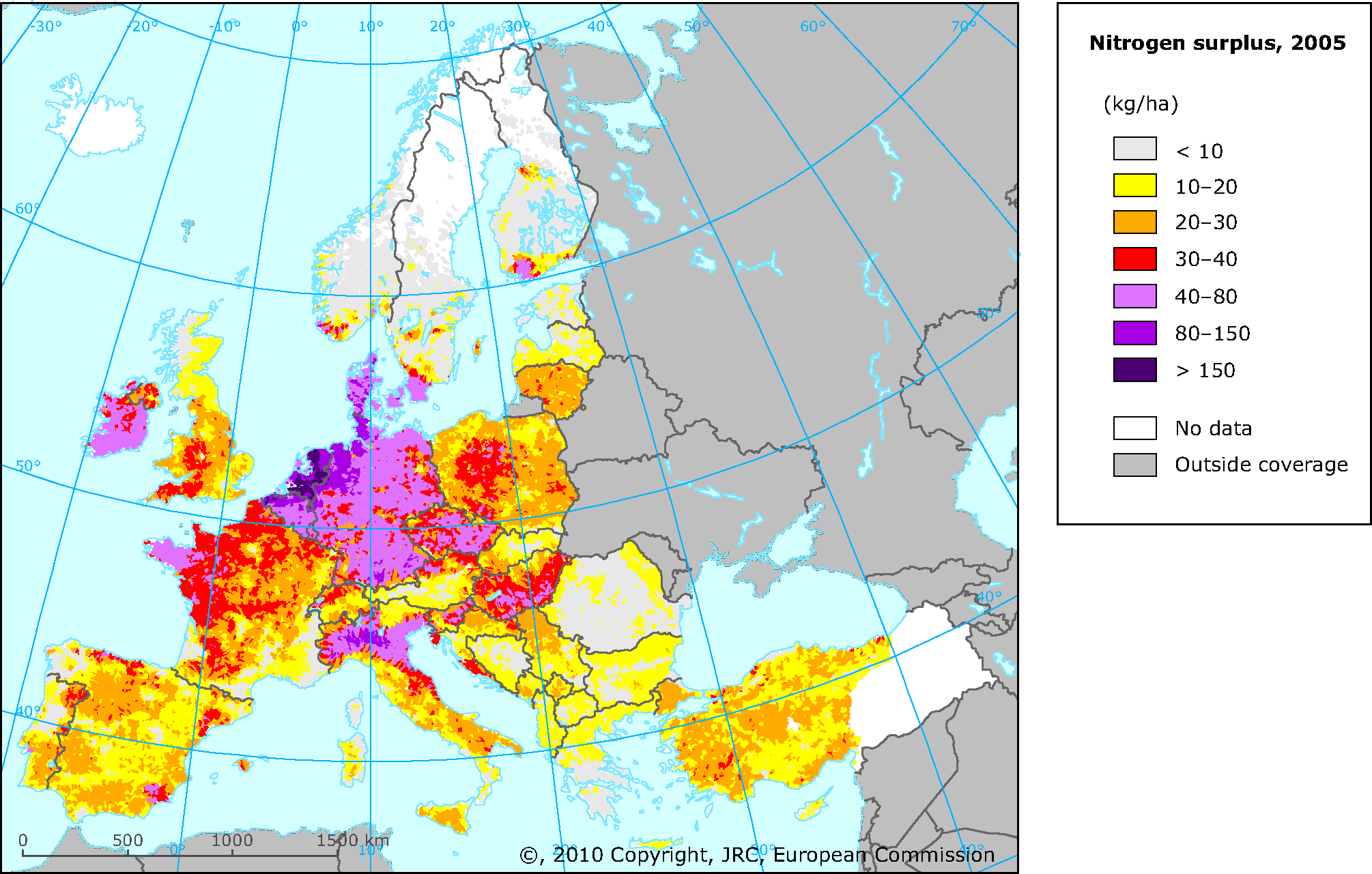
Estimated nitrogen surplus (the difference between inorganic and organic fertilizer application, atmospheric deposition, fixation and uptake by crops) for the year 2005 across Europe.

Human impact on the nitrogen cycle is diverse. Agricultural and industrial nitrogen (N) inputs to the environment currently exceed inputs from natural N fixation. This is largely attributed to the widespread use of synthetic fertilizers produced via the Haber-Bosch process, and the expansion of fossil fuel combustion following the Industrial Revolution. As a consequence of anthropogenic inputs, the global nitrogen cycle has been significantly altered over the past century, leading to increased nitrogen deposition and disruption of natural biogeochemical processes. Global atmospheric nitrous oxide (N_{2}O) mole fractions have increased from a pre-industrial value of ~270 nmol/mol to ~319 nmol/mol in 2005, a concerning trend given that N_{2}O is both a greenhouse gas and an ozone-depleting substance (ODS). Human activities account for over one-third of N_{2}O emissions (35% of total global N_{2}O emissions), with about 20% originating from agricultural sources such as fertilizer use, manure management, and aquaculture. An additional 12% of emissions arise from other anthropogenic activities including fossil fuel combustion, industrial processes, waste and wastewater treatment, and biomass burning. This article is intended to give a brief review of the history of anthropogenic N inputs, reported impacts of nitrogen inputs on selected terrestrial and aquatic ecosystems, and global players in N_{2}O emissions.

== History of anthropogenic nitrogen inputs ==
Mean acidifying emissions (air pollution) of different foods per 100g of protein
Food Types	Acidifying Emissions (g SO_{2}eq per 100g protein)
Beef	343.6
Cheese	165.5
Pork	142.7
Lamb and Mutton	139.0
Farmed Crustaceans	133.1
Poultry	102.4
Farmed Fish	65.9
Eggs	53.7
Groundnuts	22.6
Peas	8.5
Tofu	6.7

Approximately 78% of Earth's atmosphere is N gas (N_{2}), which is an inert compound and biologically unavailable to most organisms. In order to be utilized in most biological processes, N_{2} must be converted to reactive nitrogen (Nr), which includes inorganic reduced forms (NH_{3} and NH_{4}^{+}), inorganic oxidized forms (NO, NO_{2}, HNO_{3}, N_{2}O, and NO_{3}^{−}), and organic compounds (urea, amines, and proteins). N_{2} has a strong triple bond, and so a significant amount of energy (226 kcal mol^{−1}) is required to convert N_{2} to Nr. Prior to industrial processes, the only sources of such energy were solar radiation and electrical discharges. Utilizing a large amount of metabolic energy and the enzyme nitrogenase, some bacteria and cyanobacteria convert atmospheric N_{2} to NH_{3}, a process known as biological nitrogen fixation (BNF). The anthropogenic analogue to BNF is the Haber-Bosch process, in which H_{2} is reacted with atmospheric N_{2} at high temperatures and pressures to produce NH_{3}. Lastly, N_{2} is converted to NO by energy from lightning, which is negligible in current temperate ecosystems, or by fossil fuel combustion.

Until 1850, natural BNF, cultivation-induced BNF (e.g., planting of leguminous crops), and incorporated organic matter were the only sources of N for agricultural production. Near the turn of the century, Nr from guano and sodium nitrate deposits was harvested and exported from the arid Pacific islands and South American deserts. By the late 1920s, early industrial processes, albeit inefficient, were commonly used to produce NH_{3}. Due to the efforts of Fritz Haber and Carl Bosch, the Haber-Bosch process became the largest source of nitrogenous fertilizer after the 1950s, and replaced BNF as the dominant source of NH_{3} production. From 1890 to 1990, anthropogenically created Nr increased almost ninefold. During this time, the human population more than tripled, partly due to increased food production.

Since the Industrial Revolution, an additional source of anthropogenic N input has been fossil fuel combustion, which is used to release energy (e.g., to power automobiles). As fossil fuels are burned, high temperatures and pressures provide energy to produce NO from N_{2} oxidation. Additionally, when fossil fuel is extracted and burned, fossil N may become reactive (i.e., NO_{x} emissions). During the 1970s scientists began to recognize that N inputs were accumulating in the environment and affecting ecosystems.

== Impacts of anthropogenic inputs on the nitrogen cycle ==
Between 1600 and 1990, global reactive nitrogen (Nr) creation had increased nearly 50%. During this period, atmospheric emissions of Nr species reportedly increased 250% and deposition to marine and terrestrial ecosystems increased over 200%. Additionally, there was a reported fourfold increase of inorganic nitrate carried by rivers from inland areas into coastal waters. Nitrogen is a critical limiting nutrient in many systems, including forests, wetlands, and coastal and marine ecosystems; therefore, this change in emissions and distribution of Nr has resulted in substantial consequences for aquatic and terrestrial ecosystems.

=== Atmosphere ===
Mean greenhouse gas emissions for different food types
Food Types	Greenhouse Gas Emissions (g CO2-Ceq per g protein)
Ruminant Meat	62
Recirculating Aquaculture	30
Trawling Fishery	26
Non-recirculating Aquaculture	12
Pork	10
Poultry	10
Dairy	9.1
Non-trawling Fishery	8.6
Eggs	6.8
Starchy Roots	1.7
Wheat	1.2
Maize	1.2
Legumes	0.25

Atmospheric N inputs mainly include oxides of N (NO_{x}), ammonia (NH_{3}), and nitrous oxide (N_{2}O) from aquatic and terrestrial ecosystems, and NO_{x} from fossil fuel and biomass combustion.

In agroecosystems, fertilizer application has increased microbial nitrification (aerobic process in which microorganisms oxidize ammonium [NH_{4}^{+}] to nitrate [NO_{3}^{−}]) and denitrification (anaerobic process in which microorganisms reduce NO_{3}^{−} to atmospheric nitrogen gas [N_{2}]). Both processes naturally leak nitric oxide (NO) and nitrous oxide (N_{2}O) to the atmosphere. Of particular concern is N_{2}O, which has an average atmospheric lifetime of 114–120 years, and is 300 times more effective than CO_{2} as a greenhouse gas. NO_{x} produced by industrial processes, automobiles and agricultural fertilization and NH_{3} emitted from soils (i.e., as an additional byproduct of nitrification) and livestock operations are transported to downwind ecosystems, influencing N cycling and nutrient losses. Six major effects of NO_{x} and NH_{3} emissions have been cited: 1) decreased atmospheric visibility due to ammonium aerosols (fine particulate matter [PM]); 2) elevated ozone concentrations; 3) ozone and PM affects human health (e.g. respiratory diseases, cancer); 4) increases in radiative forcing and global climate change; 5) decreased agricultural productivity due to ozone deposition; and 6) ecosystem acidification and eutrophication.

=== Biosphere ===
Terrestrial and aquatic ecosystems receive Nr inputs from the atmosphere through wet and dry deposition. Atmospheric Nr species can be deposited to ecosystems in precipitation (e.g., NO_{3}^{−}, NH_{4}^{+}, organic N compounds), as gases (e.g., NH_{3} and gaseous nitric acid [HNO_{3}]), or as aerosols (e.g., ammonium nitrate [NH_{4}NO_{3}]). Aquatic ecosystems receive additional nitrogen from surface runoff and riverine inputs.

Increased N deposition can acidify soils, streams, and lakes and alter forest and grassland productivity. In grassland ecosystems, N inputs have produced initial increases in productivity followed by declines as critical thresholds are exceeded. Nitrogen effects on biodiversity, carbon cycling, and changes in species composition have also been demonstrated. In highly developed areas of near shore coastal ocean and estuarine systems, rivers deliver direct (e.g., surface runoff) and indirect (e.g., groundwater contamination) N inputs from agroecosystems. Increased N inputs can result in freshwater acidification and eutrophication of marine waters.

==== Terrestrial ecosystems ====
===== Impacts on productivity and nutrient cycling =====
Much of terrestrial growth in temperate systems is limited by N; therefore, N inputs (i.e., through deposition and fertilization) can increase N availability, which temporarily increases N uptake, plant and microbial growth, and N accumulation in plant biomass and soil organic matter. Incorporation of greater amounts of N in organic matter decreases C:N ratios, increasing mineral N release (NH_{4}^{+}) during organic matter decomposition by heterotrophic microbes (i.e., ammonification). As ammonification increases, so does nitrification of the mineralized N. Because microbial nitrification and denitrification are "leaky", N deposition is expected to increase trace gas emissions. Additionally, with increasing NH_{4}^{+} accumulation in the soil, nitrification processes release hydrogen ions, which acidify the soil. NO_{3}^{−}, the product of nitrification, is highly mobile and can be leached from the soil, along with positively charged alkaline minerals such as calcium and magnesium. In acid soils, mobilized aluminium ions can reach toxic concentrations, negatively affecting both terrestrial and adjacent aquatic ecosystems.

Anthropogenic sources of N generally reach upland forests through deposition. A potential concern of increased N deposition due to human activities is altered nutrient cycling in forest ecosystems. Numerous studies have demonstrated both positive and negative impacts of atmospheric N deposition on forest productivity and carbon storage. Added N is often rapidly immobilized by microbes, and the effect of the remaining available N depends on the plant community's capacity for N uptake. In systems with high uptake, N is assimilated into the plant biomass, leading to enhanced net primary productivity (NPP) and possibly increased carbon sequestration through greater photosynthetic capacity. However, ecosystem responses to N additions are contingent upon many site-specific factors including climate, land-use history, and amount of N additions. For example, in the Northeastern United States, hardwood stands receiving chronic N inputs have demonstrated greater capacity to retain N and increase annual net primary productivity (ANPP) than conifer stands. Once N input exceeds system demand, N may be lost via leaching and gas fluxes. When available N exceeds the ecosystem's (i.e., vegetation, soil, and microbes, etc.) uptake capacity, N saturation occurs and excess N is lost to surface waters, groundwater, and the atmosphere. N saturation can result in nutrient imbalances (e.g., loss of calcium due to nitrate leaching) and possible forest decline.

A 15-year study of chronic N additions at the Harvard Forest Long Term Ecological Research (LTER) program has elucidated many impacts of increased nitrogen deposition on nutrient cycling in temperate forests. It found that chronic N additions resulted in greater leaching losses, increased pine mortality, and cessation of biomass accumulation. Another study reported that chronic N additions resulted in accumulation of non-photosynthetic N and subsequently reduced photosynthetic capacity, supposedly leading to severe carbon stress and mortality. These findings negate previous hypotheses that increased N inputs would increase NPP and carbon sequestration.

===== Impacts on plant species diversity =====
Many plant communities have evolved under low nutrient conditions; therefore, increased N inputs can alter biotic and abiotic interactions, leading to changes in community composition. Several nutrient addition studies have shown that increased N inputs lead to dominance of fast-growing plant species, with associated declines in species richness. Fast growing species have a greater affinity for nitrogen uptake, and will crowd out slower growing plant species by blocking access to sunlight with their higher above ground biomass. Other studies have found that secondary responses of the system to N enrichment, including soil acidification and changes in mycorrhizal communities have allowed stress-tolerant species to out-compete sensitive species. Trees that have arbuscular mycorrhizal associations are more likely to benefit from an increase in soil nitrogen, as these fungi are unable to break down soil organic nitrogen. Two other studies found evidence that increased N availability has resulted in declines in species-diverse heathlands. Heathlands are characterized by N-poor soils, which exclude N-demanding grasses; however, with increasing N deposition and soil acidification, invading grasslands replace lowland heath.

In a more recent experimental study of N fertilization and disturbance (i.e., tillage) in old field succession, it was found that species richness decreased with increasing N, regardless of disturbance level. Competition experiments showed that competitive dominants excluded competitively inferior species between disturbance events. With increased N inputs, competition shifted from belowground to aboveground (i.e., to competition for light), and patch colonization rates significantly decreased. These internal changes can dramatically affect the community by shifting the balance of competition-colonization tradeoffs between species. In patch-based systems, regional coexistence can occur through tradeoffs in competitive and colonizing abilities given sufficiently high disturbance rates. That is, with inverse ranking of competitive and colonizing abilities, plants can coexist in space and time as disturbance removes superior competitors from patches, allowing for establishment of superior colonizers. However, as demonstrated by Wilson and Tilman, increased nutrient inputs can negate tradeoffs, resulting in competitive exclusion of these superior colonizers/poor competitors.

==== Aquatic ecosystems ====
Aquatic ecosystems also exhibit varied responses to nitrogen enrichment. NO_{3}^{−} loading from N saturated, terrestrial ecosystems can lead to acidification of downstream freshwater systems and eutrophication of downstream marine systems. Freshwater acidification can cause aluminium toxicity and mortality of pH-sensitive fish species. Because marine systems are generally nitrogen-limited, excessive N inputs can result in water quality degradation due to toxic algal blooms, oxygen deficiency, habitat loss, decreases in biodiversity, and fishery losses.

===== Acidification of freshwaters =====
Atmospheric N deposition in terrestrial landscapes can be transformed through soil microbial processes to biologically available nitrogen, which can result in surface-water acidification, and loss of biodiversity. NO_{3}^{−} and NH_{4}^{+} inputs from terrestrial systems and the atmosphere can acidify freshwater systems when there is little buffering capacity due to soil acidification. N pollution in Europe, the Northeastern United States, and Asia is a current concern for freshwater acidification. Lake acidification studies in the Experimental Lake Area (ELA) in northwestern Ontario clearly demonstrated the negative effects of increased acidity on a native fish species: lake trout (Salvelinus namaycush) recruitment and growth dramatically decreased due to extirpation of its key prey species during acidification. Reactive nitrogen from agriculture, animal-raising, fertilizer, septic systems, and other sources have raised nitrate concentrations in waterways of most industrialized nations. Nitrate concentrations in 1,000 Norwegian lakes had doubled in less than a decade. Rivers in the northeastern United States and the majority of Europe have increased ten to fifteen fold over the last century. Reactive nitrogen can contaminate drinking water through runoff into streams, lakes, rivers, and groundwater. In the United States alone, as much as 20% of groundwater sources exceed the World Health Organization's limit of nitrate concentration in potable water. These high concentrations can cause "blue baby disease" where nitrate ions weaken the blood's capacity to carry oxygen. Studies have also linked high concentrations of nitrates to reproductive issues and proclivity for some cancers, such as bladder and ovarian cancer.

===== Eutrophication of marine systems =====
Urbanization, deforestation, and agricultural activities largely contribute sediment and nutrient inputs to coastal waters via rivers. Increased nutrient inputs to marine systems have shown both short-term increases in productivity and fishery yields, and long-term detrimental effects of eutrophication. Tripling of NO_{3}^{−} loads in the Mississippi River in the last half of the 20th century have been correlated with increased fishery yields in waters surrounding the Mississippi delta; however, these nutrient inputs have produced seasonal hypoxia (oxygen concentrations less than 2–3 mg L^{−1}, "dead zones") in the Gulf of Mexico. In estuarine and coastal systems, high nutrient inputs increase primary production (e.g., phytoplankton, sea grasses, macroalgae), which increase turbidity with resulting decreases in light penetration throughout the water column. Consequently, submerged vegetation growth declines, which reduces habitat complexity and oxygen production. The increased primary (i.e., phytoplankton, macroalgae, etc.) production leads to a flux of carbon to bottom waters when decaying organic matter (i.e., senescent primary production) sinks and is consumed by aerobic bacteria lower in the water column. As a result, oxygen consumption in bottom waters is greater than diffusion of oxygen from surface waters. Additionally, certain algal blooms termed harmful algal blooms (HABs) produce toxins that can act as neuromuscular or organ damaging compounds. These algal blooms can be harmful to other marine life as well as to humans.

== Integration ==
The above system responses to reactive nitrogen (Nr) inputs are almost all exclusively studied separately; however, research increasingly indicates that nitrogen loading problems are linked by multiple pathways transporting nutrients across system boundaries. This sequential transfer between ecosystems is termed the nitrogen cascade. (see illustration from United Nations Environment Programme). During the cascade, some systems accumulate Nr, which results in a time lag in the cascade and enhanced effects of Nr on the environment in which it accumulates. Ultimately, anthropogenic inputs of Nr are either accumulated or denitrified; however, little progress has been made in determining the relative importance of Nr accumulation and denitrification, which has been mainly due to a lack of integration among scientific disciplines.

Most Nr applied to global agroecosystems cascades through the atmosphere and aquatic and terrestrial ecosystems until it is converted to N_{2}, primarily through denitrification. Although terrestrial denitrification produces gaseous intermediates (nitric oxide [NO] and nitrous oxide [N_{2}O]), the last step—microbial production of N_{2}— is critical because atmospheric N_{2} is a sink for Nr. Many studies have clearly demonstrated that managed buffer strips and wetlands can remove significant amounts of nitrate (NO_{3}^{−}) from agricultural systems through denitrification. Such management may help attenuate the undesirable cascading effects and eliminate environmental Nr accumulation.

Human activities dominate the global and most regional N cycles. N inputs have shown negative consequences for both nutrient cycling and native species diversity in terrestrial and aquatic systems. In fact, due to long-term impacts on food webs, Nr inputs are widely considered the most critical pollution problem in marine systems. In both terrestrial and aquatic ecosystems, responses to N enrichment vary; however, a general re-occurring theme is the importance of thresholds (e.g., nitrogen saturation) in system nutrient retention capacity. In order to control the N cascade, there must be integration of scientific disciplines and further work on Nr storage and denitrification rates.

== Global Emissions ==
As of 2020, the top five countries in anthropogenic N_{2}O emissions were China (16.7%), India (10.9%), United States (5.7%), Brazil (5.3%), and Russia (4.6%). While the EU, Japan, and Korea have successfully reduced anthropogenic N_{2}O emissions over the past decades, and China has experienced a decline in N_{2}O emissions due to improvements in nitrogen use efficiency, global emissions from direct fertilizer and manure applications have remained stable or slightly increased. In regions such as Southern Africa and the Middle East, emissions from non-agricultural sources are similar to or even exceed agricultural emissions.

== See also ==
- Planetary boundaries
