= Reactive nitrogen =

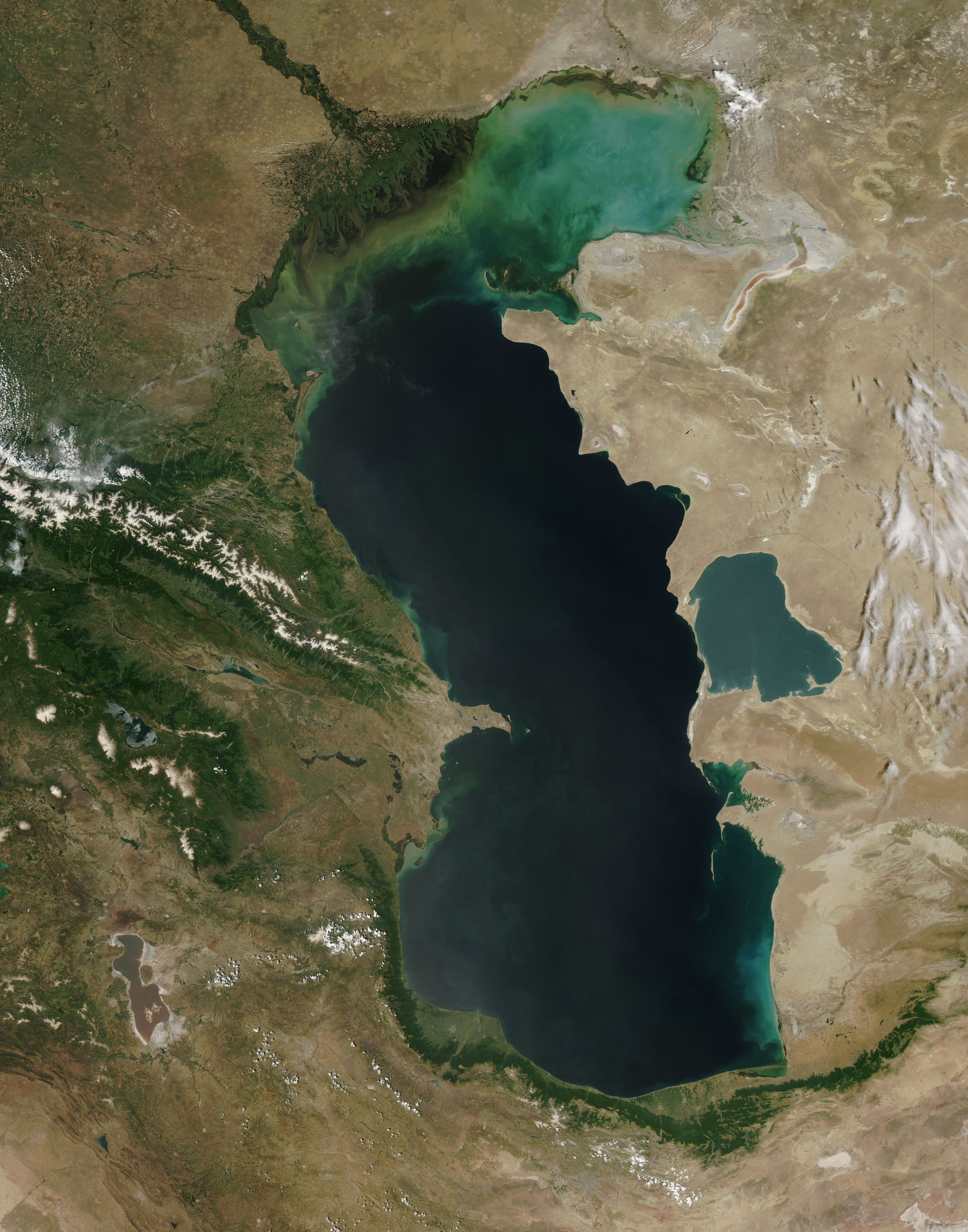
Eutrophication, which is often caused by overabundance of reactive nitrogen, is apparent as increased turbidity in the northern part of the Caspian Sea, imaged from orbit.

Reactive nitrogen ("Nr"), also known as fixed nitrogen, refers to all forms of nitrogen present in the environment except for molecular nitrogen (N_{2}). While nitrogen is an essential element for life on Earth, molecular nitrogen is comparatively unreactive, and must be converted to other chemical forms via nitrogen fixation before it can be used for growth. Common Nr species include nitrogen oxides (NO_{x}), ammonia (NH_{3}), nitrous oxide (N_{2}O), as well as the anion nitrate (NO^{−}_{3}).

Biologically, nitrogen is "fixed" mainly by the microbes (eg., Bacteria and Archaea) of the soil that fix N_{2} into mainly NH_{3} but also other species. Legumes, a type of plant in the Fabacae family, are symbionts to some of these microbes that fix N_{2}. NH_{3} is a building block to Amino acids and proteins amongst other things essential for life. However, just over half of all reactive nitrogen entering the biosphere is attributable to anthropogenic activity such as industrial fertilizer production. While reactive nitrogen is eventually converted back into molecular nitrogen via denitrification, an excess of reactive nitrogen can lead to problems such as eutrophication in marine ecosystems.

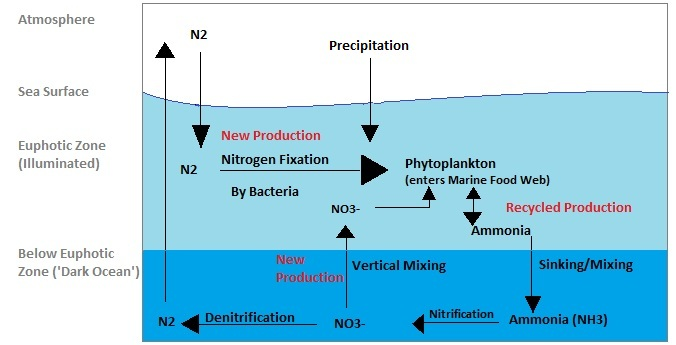
A schematic representing the marine nitrogen cycle.

== Reactive nitrogen compounds ==
In the environmental context, reactive nitrogen compounds include the following classes:

- oxide gases: nitric oxide, nitrogen dioxide, nitrous oxide. Containing oxidized nitrogen, mainly the result of industrial processes and internal combustion engines.
- anions: nitrate, nitrite. Nitrate is a common component of fertilizers, e.g. ammonium nitrate.
- amine derivatives: ammonia and ammonium salts, urea. Containing reduced nitrogen, these compounds are components of fertilizers.

All of these compounds enter into the nitrogen cycle.

As a consequence, an excess of Nr can affect the environment relatively quickly. This also means that nitrogen-related problems need to be looked at in an integrated manner.

== See also ==
- Human impact on the nitrogen cycle
