= Soil acidification =

Buildup of hydrogen cations, which reduces the soil pH

Soil acidification is the buildup of hydrogen cations, which reduces the soil pH. Chemically, this happens when a proton donor gets added to the soil. The donor can be an acid, such as nitric acid, sulfuric acid, or carbonic acid. It can also be a compound such as aluminium sulfate, which reacts in the soil to release protons. Acidification also occurs when base cations such as calcium, magnesium, potassium and sodium are leached from the soil.

Soil acidification naturally occurs as lichens and algae begin to break down rock surfaces. Acids continue with this dissolution as soil develops. With time and weathering, soils become more acidic in natural ecosystems. The acidic soil can have negative effects on microbial organisms and plant health. Soil acidification rates can vary, and increase with certain factors such as acid rain, agriculture, and pollution. This effect can be prevented through methods such as surface liming, fertilizer reduction, and irrigation.

== Causes ==
=== Acid rain ===
Rainfall is naturally acidic due to carbonic acid forming from carbon dioxide in the atmosphere. This compound causes rainfall pH to be around 5.0–5.5. When rainfall has a lower pH than natural levels, it can cause rapid acidification of soil. Sulfur dioxide and nitrogen oxides are precursors of stronger acids that can lead to acid rain production when they react with water in the atmosphere. These gases may be present in the atmosphere due to natural sources such as lightning and volcanic eruptions, or from anthropogenic emissions. Basic cations like calcium are leached from the soil as acidic rainfall flows, which allows aluminum and proton levels to increase.

Nitric and sulfuric acids in acid rain and snow can have different effects on the acidification of forest soils, particularly seasonally in regions where a snow pack may accumulate during the winter. Snow tends to contain more nitric acid than sulfuric acid, and as a result, a pulse of nitric acid-rich snow meltwater may leach through high elevation forest soils during a short time in the spring. This volume of water may comprise as much as 50% of the annual precipitation. The nitric acid flush of meltwater may cause a sharp, short term, decrease in the drainage water pH entering groundwater and surface waters. The decrease in pH can solubilize Al^{3+} that is toxic to fish, especially newly-hatched fry with immature gill systems through which they pass large volumes of water to obtain O_{2} for respiration. As the snow meltwater flush passes, water temperatures rise, and lakes and streams produce more dissolved organic matter; the Al concentration in drainage water decreases and is bound to organic acids, making it less toxic to fish. In rain, the ratio of nitric-to-sulfuric acids decreases to approximately 1:2. The higher sulfuric acid content of rain also may not release as much Al^{3+} from soils as does nitric acid, in part due to the retention (adsorption) of SO_{4}^{2-} by soils. This process releases OH^{−} into soil solution and buffers the pH decrease caused by the added H^{+} from both acids. The forest floor organic soil horizons that are high in organic matter also buffer pH, and decrease the load of H+ that subsequently leaches through underlying mineral horizons.

=== Biological weathering ===
Plant roots acidify soil by releasing protons and organic acids so as to chemically weather soil minerals. Decaying remains of dead plants on soil may also form organic acids which contribute to soil acidification. Acidification from leaf litter on the O-horizon is more pronounced under coniferous trees such as pine, spruce and fir, which return fewer base cations to the soil, rather than under deciduous trees; however, soil pH differences attributed to vegetation often preexisted that vegetation, and help select for species which tolerate them. Calcium accumulation in existing biomass also strongly affects soil pH - a factor which can vary from species to species.

=== Parent materials ===
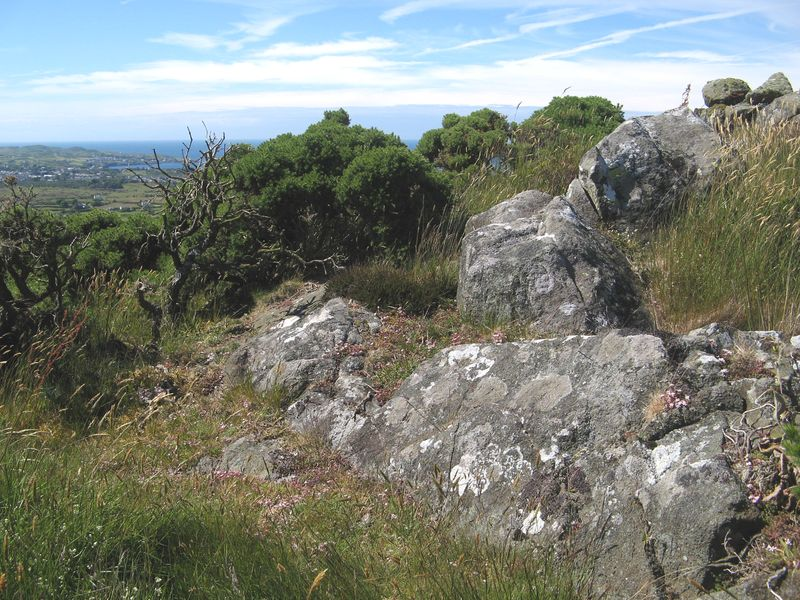
Igneous rock releases silicic acid which emits hydrogen ions, lowering the pH of the surrounding soil.

Certain parent materials also contribute to soil acidification. Granites and their allied igneous rocks are called "acidic" because they have a lot of free quartz, which produces silicic acid on weathering. Also, they have relatively low amounts of calcium and magnesium. Some sedimentary rocks such as shale and coal are rich in sulfides, which, when hydrated and oxidized, produce sulfuric acid which is much stronger than silicic acid. Many coal soils are too acidic to support vigorous plant growth, and coal gives off strong precursors to acid rain when it is burned. Marine clays are also sulfide-rich in many cases, and such clays become very acidic if they are drained to an oxidizing state.

=== Soil amendments ===
Soil amendments such as chemical fertilizers can cause soil acidification. Sulfur based fertilizers can be highly acidifying, examples include elemental sulfur and iron sulfate while others like potassium sulfate have no significant effect on soil pH. While most nitrogen fertilizers have an acidifying effect, ammonium-based nitrogen fertilizers are more acidifying than other nitrogen sources. Ammonia-based nitrogen fertilizers include ammonium sulfate, diammonium phosphate, monoammonium phosphate, and ammonium nitrate. Organic nitrogen sources, such as urea and compost, are less acidifying. Nitrate sources which have little or no ammonium, such as calcium nitrate, magnesium nitrate, potassium nitrate, and sodium nitrate, are not acidifying.

=== Pollution ===
Acidification may also occur from nitrogen emissions into the air, as the nitrogen may end up deposited into the soil. Animal livestock is responsible for nearly 65 percent of man-made ammonia emissions.

Anthropogenic sources of sulfur dioxides and nitrogen oxides play a major role in increase of acid rain production. The use of fossil fuels and motor exhaust are the largest anthropogenic contributors to sulfuric gases and nitrogen oxides, respectively.

Aluminum is one of the few elements capable of making soil more acidic. This is achieved by aluminum taking hydroxide ions out of water, leaving hydrogen ions behind. As a result, the soil is more acidic, which makes it unlivable for many plants. Another consequence of aluminum in soils is aluminum toxicity, which inhibits root growth.

=== Agriculture management practices ===
Agriculture managements approaches such as monoculture and chemical fertilization often leads to soil problems such as soil acidification, degradation, and soil-borne diseases, which ultimately have a negative impact on agricultural productivity and sustainability.

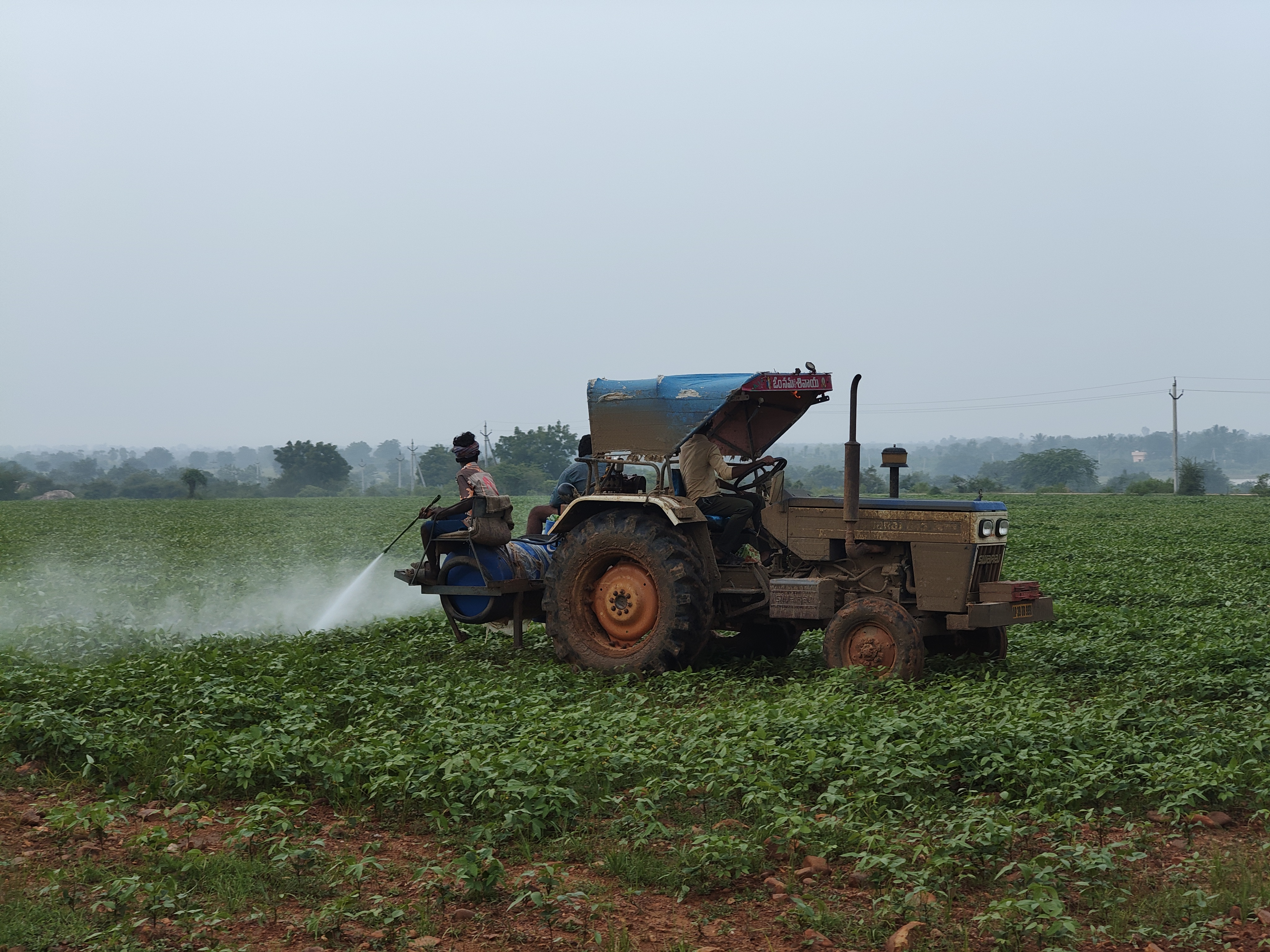
Spraying pesticides on fields to protect the crops from pests.

Pesticides are a common agricultural practice that can have a negative impact on microbial organisms and plant health. Most pesticides have a pH between 5.5 and 7 which is acidic, so after long term use it can decrease the pH making the soil more acidic. After pesticide overuse, various factors such as sunlight, microbial activity, and water break down the pesticides to release an excess amount of hydrogen ions in the soil, lowering the pH. Without these nutrients the soil can't support the survival of living organisms which inhibits them from assisting plant and soil health. Ammonia-oxidizing microorganisms (AOM) are sensitive to pesticides and have an abundance of the amoA gene which help promote nitrogen cycling and maintaining soil health. Nitrification done by these organisms benefits plants but releases a byproduct of hydrogen ions and nitric acid which continue to acidify the soil. Some nitrogen-containing pesticides release high amounts of ammonium, which is a reactant for the nitrification process.

It is essential to check the label on the pesticide and perform calculations for the size of application to achieve efficient pesticide. Other factors such as water temperature, soil type, persistence, pesticide type, and legal restrictions should be considered and have research done before application.

== Effects ==
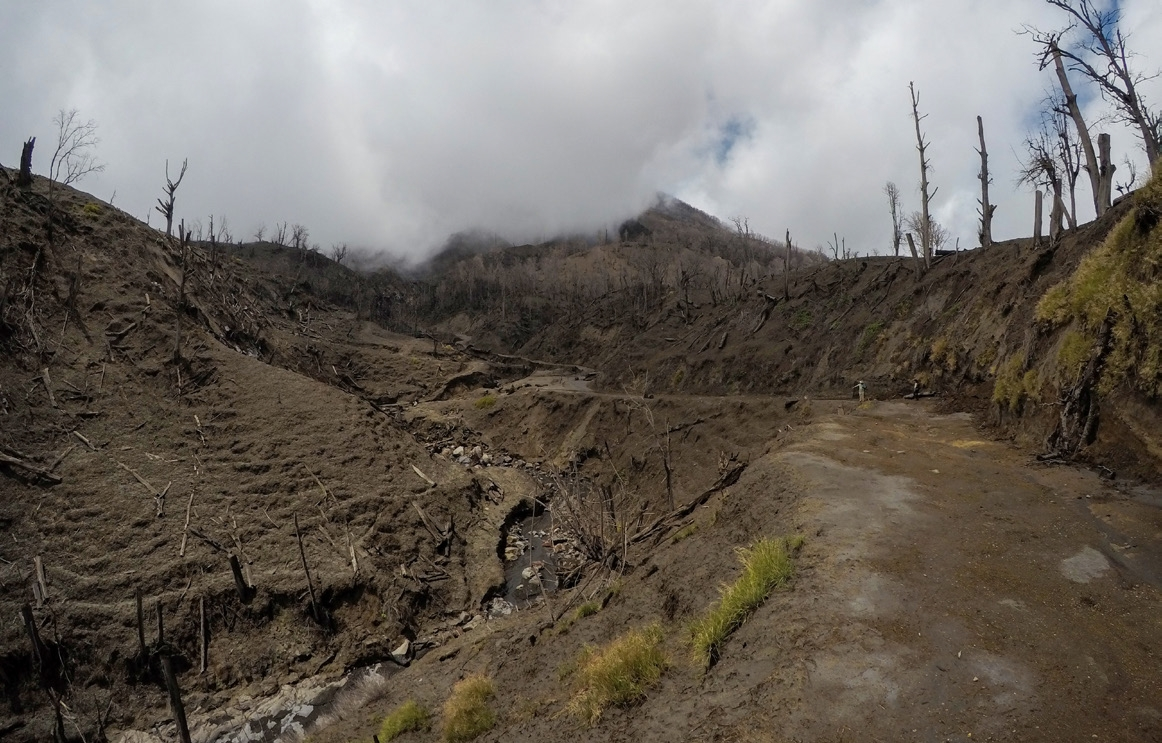
Visual effects of acid rain (caused by volcanic emissions) in Costa Rica: leafless and decaying trees, eroded soil, and a large loss of vegetation.

Soil acidification can cause damage to plants and organisms in the soil. In plants, soil acidification results in smaller, less durable roots. Acidic soils sometimes damage the root tips reducing further growth. Plant height is impaired and seed germination also decreases. Soil acidification impacts plant health, resulting in reduced cover and lower plant density. Overall, stunted growth is seen in plants. Soil acidification is directly linked to a decline in endangered species of plants.

In the soil, acidification reduces microbial and macrofaunal diversity. This can reduce soil structure decline which makes it more sensitive to erosion. There are less nutrients available in the soil, larger impact of toxic elements to plants, and consequences to soil biological functions (such as nitrogen fixation). A recent study showed that sugarcane monoculture induces soil acidity, reduces soil fertility, shifts microbial structure, and reduces its activity. Furthermore, most beneficial bacterial genera decreased significantly due to sugarcane monoculture, while beneficial fungal genera showed a reverse trend. Therefore, mitigating soil acidity, improving soil fertility, and soil enzymatic activities, including improved microbial structure with beneficial service to plants and soil, can be an effective measure to develop a sustainable sugarcane cropping system.

At a larger scale, soil acidification is linked to losses in agricultural productivity due to these effects.

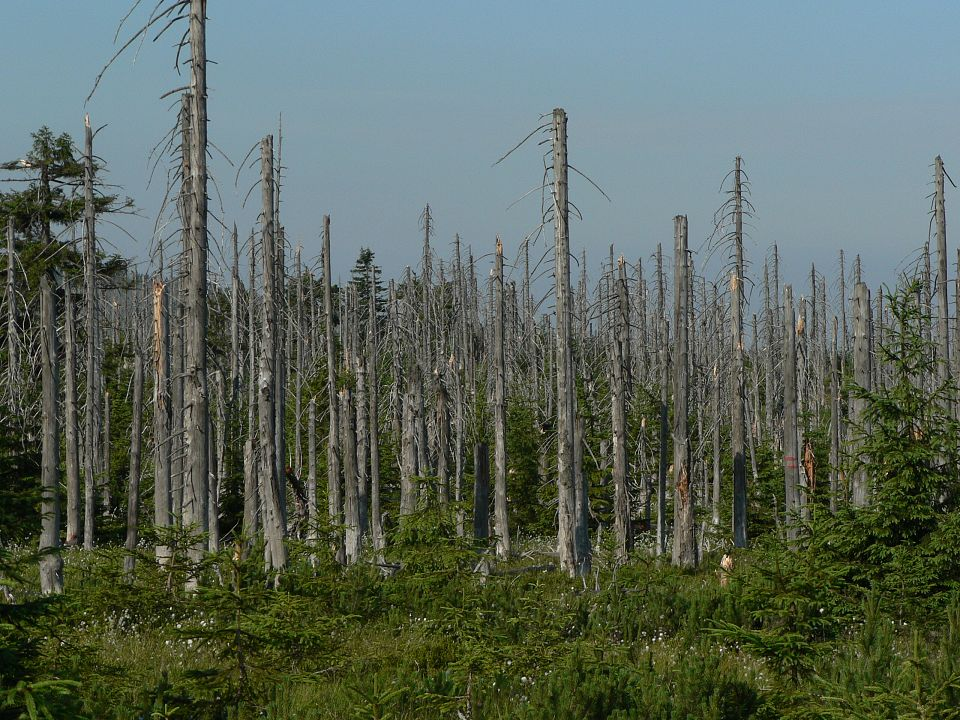
Acid rain causes the removal and degradation of leaves on trees in the Czech Republic.

Impacts of acidic water and soil acidification on plants could be minor or in most cases major. In minor cases which do not result in fatality of plant life include; less-sensitive plants to acidic conditions and or less potent acid rain. Also in minor cases the plant will eventually die due to the acidic water lowering the plants natural pH. Acidic water enters the plant and causes important plant minerals to dissolve and get carried away; which ultimately causes the plant to die of lack of minerals for nutrition. In major cases which are more extreme; the same process of damage occurs as in minor cases, which is removal of essential minerals, but at a much quicker rate. Likewise, acid rain that falls on soil and on plant leaves causes drying of the waxy leaf cuticle; which ultimately causes rapid water loss from the plant to the outside atmosphere and results in death of the plant. This causes essential base cations in the soil to leach away and increase the availability of toxic ions which impairs plant roots. If a plant is being affected by soil acidification, one can closely observe the plant leaves yellowing between the veins and/or stunted growth. If the leaves are green and look healthy, the soil pH is normal and acceptable for plant life. However, the symptom of yellowing leaves isn't consistent with soil acidification as it can also result from alkaline soil conditions or nutrient deficient soil. Moreover, a plant suffering from soil acidification has difficulty photosynthesizing. Drying out of the plant due to acidic water destroys chloroplast organelles. Without being able to photosynthesize a plant cannot create nutrients for its own survival or oxygen for the survival of aerobic organisms; which affects most species of Earth and ultimately end the purpose of the plant's existence.

== Prevention and management ==
Soil acidification is a common issue in long-term crop production which can be reduced by lime, organic amendments (e.g., straw and manure) and biochar application. In sugarcane, soybean and corn crops grown in acidic soils, lime application resulted in nutrient restoration, increase in soil pH, increase in root biomass, and better plant health. Liming deeper in the soil is more effective than surface liming, but it can be more expensive and difficult.

Different management strategies may also be applied to prevent further acidification: using less acidifying fertilizers, considering fertilizer amount and application timing to reduce nitrate-nitrogen leaching, good irrigation management with acid-neutralizing water, and considering the ratio of basic nutrients to nitrogen in harvested crops. Sulfur fertilizers should only be used in responsive crops with a high rate of crop recovery.

By reducing anthropogenic sources of sulfur dioxides and nitrogen oxides, and with air-pollution control measures, acid rain and soil acidification can be reduced worldwide.

This has been observed in Ontario, Canada, over several lakes and demonstrated improvements in water pH and alkalinity.

== Geographic distribution ==
Soil acidification is most commonly found in Southeast Asia, Amazon Rainforest, Sub-Saharan Africa, and the Eastern United States. Each region has various causes to their soil acidity.

- Southeast Asia: volcanic activity and acid rain, industrialization over time can increase soil acidification
- Amazon Rainforest: biological weathering and acid rain, air pollution (motor vehicles and industrial practices) is the main cause of acid rain in the rainforest
- Sub-Saharan Africa: acid rain and aluminum saturation in topsoil
- Eastern United States: parent material (granite and igneous rock) and the soil lacks cations after decades of industrialization increasing the soil acidity

== See also ==
- Acid sulfate soil – Soils formed under waterlogged conditions
- Alkali soil – Soil type with pH > 8.5
- Freshwater acidification – Acidification of freshwater by rain
- Ocean acidification – Decrease of pH levels in the ocean
