= Plant nutrients in soil =

Nutrient within the soil

Sixteen elements or nutrients are essential for plant growth and reproduction. They are carbon (C), hydrogen (H), oxygen (O), nitrogen (N), phosphorus (P), potassium (K), sulfur (S), calcium (Ca), magnesium (Mg), iron (Fe), boron (B), manganese (Mn), copper (Cu), zinc (Zn), molybdenum (Mo), and chlorine (Cl). Nutrients required for plants to complete their life cycle are considered essential nutrients. Nutrients that enhance the growth of plants but are not necessary to complete the plant's life cycle are considered non-essential, although some of them, such as silicon (Si), have been shown to improve nutrient availability, hence the use of stinging nettle and horsetail (both silica-rich) macerations in biodynamic agriculture. With the exception of carbon, hydrogen and oxygen, which are supplied by carbon dioxide and water, and nitrogen, provided through nitrogen fixation, the nutrients derive originally from the mineral component of the soil. The Liebig's law of the minimum expresses that when the available form of a nutrient is not in enough proportion in the soil solution, then other nutrients cannot be taken up at an optimum rate by a plant because of stoichiometry constraints. A particular nutrient ratio of the soil solution is thus mandatory for optimizing plant growth, a value which might differ from nutrient ratios calculated from plant composition.

Plant uptake of nutrients can only proceed when they are present in a plant-available form. In most situations, nutrients are absorbed from the soil water in an ionic form by diffusion, mass transport, and root interception. Although minerals are the origin of most nutrients, and the bulk of most nutrient elements in the soil is held in crystalline form within primary and secondary minerals, they weather too slowly to support rapid plant growth. For example, the application of finely ground minerals, feldspar and apatite, to soil seldom provides the necessary amounts of potassium and phosphorus at a rate sufficient for good plant growth, as most of the nutrients remain bound in the crystals of those minerals. However, the association of plant roots with mycorrhizal fungal partners increases the dissolution rate of phosphorus-containing apatite.

The nutrients adsorbed in an exchangeable form onto the surfaces of clay colloids and soil organic matter (the soil matrix) provide a more accessible reservoir of many plant nutrients (e.g. K, Ca, Mg, P, Zn). As plants absorb the nutrients from the soil water, the soluble pool is replenished (exchanged) from the surface-bound pool. The decomposition of soil organic matter by microorganisms is another mechanism whereby the soluble pool of nutrients is replenished – this is important for the supply of plant-available N, S, P, and B from soil.

Gram for gram, the capacity of humus to hold nutrients and water is far greater than that of clay minerals, most of the soil cation exchange capacity arising from charged carboxylic groups on organic matter. However, despite the great capacity of humus to retain water once water-soaked, its high hydrophobicity decreases its wettability. All in all, small amounts of humus may remarkably increase the soil's capacity to promote plant growth.

Plant nutrients, their chemical symbols, and the ionic forms common in soils and available for plant uptake
Element	Symbol	Ion or molecule
Carbon	C	CO_{2} (mostly through leaf and root litter)
Hydrogen	H	H^{+}, HOH (water)
Oxygen	O	O^{2−}, OH^{−}, CO_{3}^{2−}, SO_{4}^{2−}, CO_{2}
Phosphorus	P	H_{2}PO_{4}^{−}, HPO_{4}^{2−} (phosphates)
Potassium	K	K^{+}
Nitrogen	N	NH_{4}^{+}, NO_{3}^{−} (ammonium, nitrate)
Sulfur	S	SO_{4}^{2−}
Calcium	Ca	Ca^{2+}
Iron	Fe	Fe^{2+}, Fe^{3+} (ferrous, ferric)
Magnesium	Mg	Mg^{2+}
Boron	B	H_{3}BO_{3}, H_{2}BO_{3}^{−}, B(OH)_{4}^{−}
Manganese	Mn	Mn^{2+}
Copper	Cu	Cu^{2+}
Zinc	Zn	Zn^{2+}
Molybdenum	Mo	MoO_{4}^{2−} (molybdate)
Chlorine	Cl	Cl^{−} (chloride)

== Uptake processes ==
Nutrients in the soil are taken up by the plant through its roots, and in particular its root hairs. To be taken up by a plant, a nutrient element must be located near the root surface; however, the supply of nutrients in contact with the root is rapidly depleted within a distance of ca. 2 mm. There are three basic mechanisms whereby nutrient ions dissolved in the soil solution are brought into contact with plant roots:

1. Mass flow of water
2. Diffusion within water
3. Interception by root growth

All three mechanisms operate simultaneously, but one mechanism or another may be most important for a particular nutrient. For example, in the case of calcium, which is generally plentiful in the soil solution, except when aluminium over competes calcium on cation exchange sites in very acid soils (pH less than 4), mass flow alone can usually bring sufficient amounts to the root surface. However, in the case of phosphorus, diffusion is needed to supplement mass flow. For the most part, nutrient ions must travel some distance in the soil solution to reach the root surface. This movement can take place by mass flow, as when dissolved nutrients are carried along with the soil water flowing toward a root that is actively drawing water from the soil. In this type of movement, the nutrient ions are somewhat analogous to leaves floating down a stream. In addition, nutrient ions continually move by diffusion from areas of greater concentration toward the nutrient-depleted areas of lower concentration around the root surface. That process is due to random motion, also called Brownian motion, of molecules within a gradient of decreasing concentration. By the mean of diffusion, plants can continue to take up nutrients even when transpiration stops following stomatal closure and thus mass flow is interrupted. Finally, root interception comes into play as roots continually grow into new, undepleted soil. By this way roots are also able to absorb nanomaterials such as nanoparticulate organic matter.

Estimated relative importance of mass flow, diffusion and root interception as mechanisms in supplying plant nutrients to corn plant roots in soils
Nutrient	Approximate percentage supplied by:		
Nutrient	Mass flow	Root interception	Diffusion
Nitrogen	98.8	1.2	0
Phosphorus	6.3	2.8	90.9
Potassium	20.0	2.3	77.7
Calcium	71.4	28.6	0
Sulfur	95.0	5.0	0
Molybdenum	95.2	4.8	0

In the above table, phosphorus and potassium nutrients move more by diffusion than they do by mass flow in the soil water solution, as they are rapidly taken up by the roots creating a concentration of almost zero near the roots (the plants cannot transpire enough water to draw more of those nutrients near the roots). The very steep concentration gradient is of greater influence in the movement of those ions than is the movement of those by mass flow. The movement by mass flow requires the transpiration of water from the plant causing water and solution ions to also move toward the roots. Movement by root interception is slowest, being at the rate plants extend their roots.

Plants move ions out of their roots in an effort to move nutrients in from the soil, an exchange process which occurs in the root apoplast. Hydrogen H^{+} is exchanged for other cations, and carbonate (HCO_{3}^{−}) and hydroxide (OH^{−}) anions are exchanged for nutrient anions. As plant roots remove nutrients from the soil water solution, they are replenished as other ions move off of clay and humus (by ion exchange or desorption), are added from the weathering of soil minerals, and are released by the decomposition of soil organic matter. However, the rate at which plant roots remove nutrients may not cope with the rate at which they are replenished in the soil solution, stemming in nutrient limitation to plant growth. Plants derive a large proportion of their anion nutrients from decomposing organic matter, which typically holds 90–95% of the soil nitrogen and sulfur and 20–75% of the soil phosphorus. Where crops are produced, the replenishment of nutrients in the soil must usually be augmented by the addition of fertilizer or organic matter.

Because nutrient uptake is an active metabolic process, conditions that inhibit root metabolism may also inhibit nutrient uptake. Examples of such conditions include waterlogging or soil compaction resulting in poor soil aeration, excessively high or low soil temperatures, and all above-ground conditions that result in low translocation of sugars to plant roots.

== Carbon ==
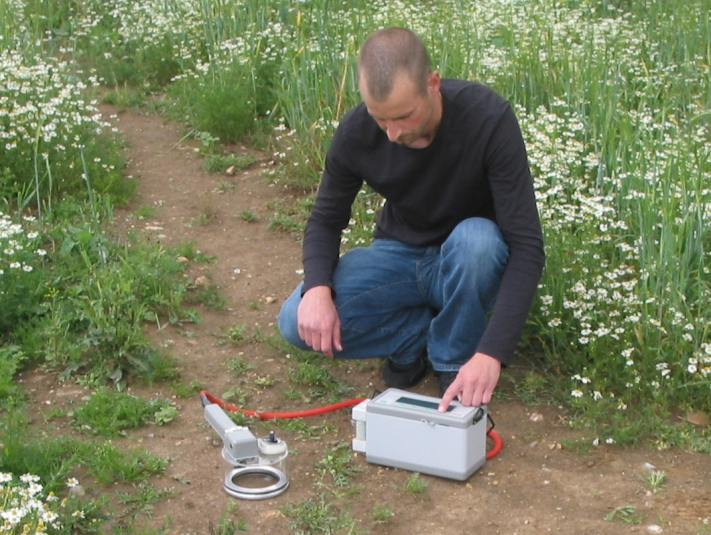
Measuring soil respiration in the field using an SRS2000 system.

Plants obtain their carbon from atmospheric carbon dioxide through photosynthetic carboxylation, to which must be added the uptake of dissolved carbon from the soil solution and carbon transfer through mycorrhizal networks. About 45% of a plant's dry mass is carbon; plant residues typically have a carbon to nitrogen ratio (C/N) of between 13:1 and 100:1. As the soil organic material is digested by micro-organisms and saprophagous soil fauna, the C/N decreases as the carbonaceous material is metabolized and carbon dioxide (CO_{2}) is released as a byproduct which then finds its way out of the soil and into the atmosphere. Nitrogen turnover (mostly involved in protein turnover) is lesser than that of carbon (mostly involved in respiration) in the living, then dead matter of decomposers, which are always richer in nitrogen than plant litter, and so it builds up in the soil. Normal CO_{2} concentration in the atmosphere is 0.03%, this can be the factor limiting plant growth when no other factor like water or nutrient scarcity is involved. The respiration of CO_{2} by soil microorganisms decomposing soil organic matter and the CO_{2} respired by roots contribute an important amount of CO_{2} to the photosynthesising plants, to which must be added the CO_{2} respired by aboveground plant tissues. Root-respired CO_{2} can be accumulated overnight within hollow stems of plants, to be further used for photosynthesis during the day. Within the soil, CO_{2} concentration is 10 to 100 times that of atmospheric levels but may rise to toxic levels if the soil porosity is low or if diffusion is impeded by flooding.

== Nitrogen ==
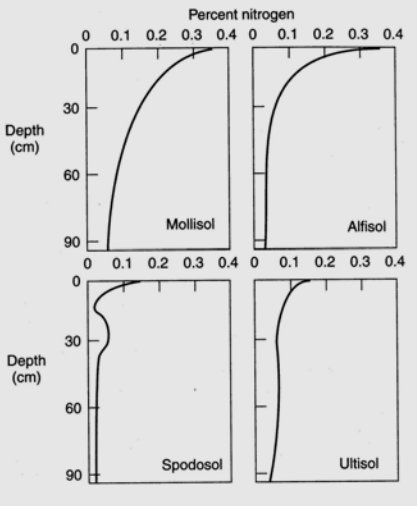
Generalization of percent soil nitrogen by soil order

Nitrogen is the most critical element obtained by plants from the soil, to the exception of moist tropical forests (tropical rainforests) where phosphorus is the limiting soil nutrient, and nitrogen deficiency often limits plant growth through decreased photosynthetic rate. Plants can use nitrogen as either the ammonium cation (NH_{4}^{+}) or the anion nitrate (NO_{3}^{−}). Plants are commonly classified as ammonium or nitrate plants according to their preferential nitrogen nutrition. Usually, most of the nitrogen in soil is bound within organic compounds that make up the soil organic matter, and must be mineralized to the ammonium or nitrate form before it can be taken up by most plants. However, symbiosis with mycorrhizal fungi allow plants to get access to the organic nitrogen pool where and when mineral forms of nitrogen are poorly available. The total nitrogen content depends largely on the soil organic matter content, which in turn depends on texture, climate, vegetation, topography, age and soil management. Soil nitrogen typically decreases by 0.2 to 0.3% for every temperature increase by 10 °C. Usually, grassland soils contain more soil nitrogen than forest soils, because of a higher turnover rate of grassland organic matter. Cultivation decreases soil nitrogen by exposing soil organic matter to decomposition by microorganisms, most losses being caused by denitrification, and soils under no-tillage maintain more soil nitrogen than tilled soils.

Some micro-organisms are able to metabolise organic matter and release ammonium in a process called mineralisation. Others, called nitrifiers, take free ammonium or nitrite as an intermediary step in the process of nitrification, and oxidise it to nitrate. Nitrogen-fixing bacteria are capable of metabolising N_{2} into the form of ammonia or related nitrogenous compounds in a process called nitrogen fixation. Both ammonium and nitrate can be immobilized by their incorporation into microbial living cells, where it is temporarily sequestered in the form of amino acids and proteins. Nitrate may be lost from the soil to the atmosphere when bacteria metabolise it to the gases NH_{3}, N_{2} and N_{2}O, a process called denitrification. Nitrogen may also be leached from the vadose zone if in the form of nitrate, acting as a pollutant if it reaches the water table or flows over land, more especially in agricultural soils under high use of nutrient fertilizers. Ammonium may also be sequestered in 2:1 clay minerals. A small amount of nitrogen is added to soil by rainfall, to the exception of wide areas of North America and West Europe where the excess use of nitrogen fertilizers and manure has caused atmospheric pollution by ammonia emission, stemming in soil acidification and eutrophication of soils and aquatic ecosystems.

=== Gains ===
In the process of mineralisation, microbes feed on organic matter, releasing ammonia (NH_{3}), ammonium (NH_{4}^{+}), nitrate (NO_{3}^{−}) and other nutrients. As long as the carbon to nitrogen ratio (C/N) of fresh residues in the soil is above 30:1, nitrogen will be in short supply for the nitrogen-rich microbal biomass (nitrogen deficiency), and other bacteria will uptake ammonium and to a lesser extent nitrate and incorporate them into their cells in the immobilization process. In that form the nitrogen is said to be immobilised. Later, when such bacteria die and decay, they too are mineralised and some of the nitrogen is released as ammonium and nitrate. Predation of bacteria by soil fauna, in particular protozoa and nematodes, play a decisive role in the return of immobilized nitrogen to mineral forms. If the C/N of fresh residues is less than 15, mineral nitrogen is freed to the soil and directly available to plants. Bacteria may on average add 50 kg nitrogen per hectare (net mineralization rate), and in an unfertilised field this is the most important source of usable nitrogen, corresponding roughly to 2% total soil nitrogen. It occurs fastest in warm, moist, well aerated soil.

Carbon/Nitrogen Ratio of Various Organic Materials
Organic Material	C:N Ratio
Alfalfa	13
Bacteria	4
Clover, green sweet	16
Clover, mature sweet	23
Fungi	9
Forest litter	30
Humus in warm cultivated soils	11
Legume-grass hay	25
Legumes (alfalfa or clover), mature	20
Manure, cow	18
Manure, horse	16–45
Manure, human	10
Oat straw	80
Straw, cornstalks	90
Sawdust	250

In nitrogen fixation, rhizobium bacteria convert N_{2} to ammonia (NH_{3}), which is rapidly converted to amino acids, parts of which are used by the rhizobia for the synthesis of their own biomass proteins, while other parts are transported to the xylem of the host plant. Rhizobia share a symbiotic relationship with host plants, since rhizobia supply the host with nitrogen and the host provides rhizobia with other nutrients and a safe environment. It is estimated that such symbiotic bacteria in the root nodules of legumes add potentially 200 to 300 kilograms of nitrogen per hectare per year, which may be sufficient for the crop. Other, free-living nitrogen-fixing diazotroph bacteria and archaea live independently in the soil and release mineral forms of nitrogen when their dead bodies are converted by way of mineralization, free-living nitrogen fixation being the dominant source of N availability in temperate forests, temperate grasslands, and shrublands.

Some amount of atmospheric nitrogen is transformed by lightnings in gaseous nitric oxide (NO) and nitrogen dioxide (NO_{2}^{−}). Nitrogen dioxide is soluble in water to form nitric acid (HNO_{3}) dissociating in H^{+} and NO_{3}^{−}. Ammonia, NH_{3}, previously emitted from the soil, may fall with precipitation up to a rate of about 40 and 50 kg ha−1 yr−1 then be taken up by vegetation foliage and roots, fixed in the soil by clay minerals and humus or transformed by nitrification as nitric acid, becoming a prominent agent of soil acidification.

=== Sequestration ===
When bacteria feed on soluble forms of nitrogen (ammonium and nitrate), they temporarily sequester that nitrogen in their bodies in a process called immobilization. At a later time when those bacteria die, their nitrogen may be released as ammonium by the process of mineralization, sped up by predatory fauna.

Protein material is easily broken down, but the rate of its decomposition is slowed by its attachment to the crystalline structure of clay and when trapped between the clay layers or attached to rough clay surfaces. The layers are small enough that bacteria cannot enter. Some organisms exude extracellular enzymes that can act on the sequestered proteins. However, those enzymes too may be trapped on the clay crystals, resulting in a complex interaction between proteins, microbial enzymes and mineral surfaces.

Ammonium fixation occurs mainly between the layers of 2:1 type clay minerals such as illite, vermiculite or montmorillonite, together with ions of similar ionic radius and low hydration energy such as potassium, but a small proportion of ammonium is also fixed in the silt fraction.

=== Losses ===
Usable nitrogen may be lost from soils when it is in the form of nitrate, as it is easily leached, contrary to ammonium which is easily fixed. Further losses of nitrogen occur by denitrification, the process whereby soil bacteria convert nitrate (NO_{3}^{−}) to nitrogen gas, N_{2} or N_{2}O. This occurs when poor soil aeration limits free oxygen, forcing bacteria to use the oxygen in nitrate for their respiratory process. Denitrification increases when oxidisable organic material is available, as in organic farming and when soils are warm and slightly acidic, as currently happens in tropical areas. Denitrification may vary throughout a soil as the aeration varies from place to place. Denitrification may cause the loss of 25 percent of the N applied on a heavy clay soil as fertilizer and manure.

Ammonia volatilisation occurs when ammonium reacts chemically with an alkaline soil, converting NH_{4}^{+} to NH_{3}. The application of ammonium fertiliser to such a field can result in volatilisation losses of as much as 87 percent.

All kinds of nitrogen losses, whether by leaching or volatilization, are responsible for a large part of aquifer pollution and air pollution, with concomitant effects on soil acidification and eutrophication, a novel combination of environmental threats (acidity and excess nitrogen) to which extant organisms are badly adapted, causing severe biodiversity losses in natural ecosystems.

== Phosphorus ==
After nitrogen, phosphorus is probably the element most likely to be deficient in soils, although it often turns to be the most deficient in tropical soils where the mineral pool is depleted under intense leaching and mineral weathering while, contrary to nitrogen, phosphorus reserves cannot be replenished from atmospheric sources. The soil mineral apatite is the most common mineral source of phosphorus, from which it can be extracted by microbial and root exudates, with an important contribution of arbuscular mycorrhizal fungi. The most common form of organic phosphate is phytate, the principal storage form of phosphorus in many plant tissues. In the soil, phosphorus is generally in the form of orthophosphate with low solubility, except when linked to ammonium or calcium, hence the use of diammonium phosphate or monocalcium phosphate as fertilizers. Total phosphorus is in average 0.06 percent by weight of the soil, but may vary by up to three orders of magnitude across the globe, and is mainly in organic form, not directly available to plants until organic matter is mineralized or phosphorus is transferred to the host plant by arbuscular mycorrhizal fungi. Agricultural fields may need to be fertilised to make up for the phosphorus that has been removed in the crop, but care must be taken that no surplus accumulates in soil in the long term.

When phosphorus does form solubilised ions of H_{2}PO_{4}^{−}, if not taken up by plant roots these ions rapidly form insoluble calcium phosphates or hydrous oxides of iron and aluminium. Phosphorus is largely immobile in the soil and is not leached but actually builds up in the organic surface layer if not cropped. The application of soluble fertilizers to soils may result in zinc deficiencies as zinc phosphates form, but soil pH levels, partly depending on the form of phosphorus in the fertiliser, strongly interact with this effect, in some cases resulting in increased zinc availability. Lack of phosphorus may interfere with the normal opening of the plant leaf stomata, decreased stomatal conductance resulting in decreased photosynthesis and respiration rates while decreased transpiration increases plant temperature. Phosphorus is most available when soil pH is 6.5 in mineral soils, and 5.5 in organic soils.

== Potassium ==
The amount of potassium in a soil ranges between 3 and 100 tons per hectare in the upper 20 cm of the soil profile, of which only 2 per cent is available for plant growth. Common mineral sources of potassium are the mica biotite and potassium feldspar, KAlSi_{3}O_{8}. Rhizosphere bacteria, also called rhizobacteria, contribute through the production of organic acids to its solubilization. When solubilised, half will be held as exchangeable cations on clay minerals while the other half is in the soil water solution. Potassium fixation often occurs when soils dry and the potassium is bonded between layers of 2:1 expansive clay minerals such as illite, vermiculite or montmorillonite. Under certain conditions, dependent on the soil texture, intensity of drying, and initial amount of exchangeable potassium, the fixed percentage may be as much as 90 percent within ten minutes. Potassium is easily leached, and thus lost for plant growth, from soils low in clay, except if manuring or liming compensates for poor cation-exchange capacity of the mineral soil.

== Calcium ==
Calcium is generally available but may be low as it is soluble and can be leached. It is thus low in sandy and heavily leached soil or strongly acidic mineral soils, resulting in excessive concentration of free hydrogen ions in the soil solution, and therefore these soils require liming. Calcium is supplied to the plant in the form of exchangeable ions and moderately soluble minerals. There are four main forms of calcium in the soil, among many others. Soil calcium can be in insoluble forms such as calcite, dolomite, in the soil solution in the form of a divalent cation or retained in exchangeable form at the surface of mineral and organic particles. Another main form is when calcium complexes with organic matter, forming covalent bonds between organic compounds which contribute to structural stability. Calcium is more available on the soil colloids than is potassium because the common mineral calcite, CaCO_{3}, is more soluble than potassium-bearing minerals such as feldspar.

Calcium uptake by roots is essential for plant nutrition, contrary to an old tenet that it was luxury consumption. Calcium is considered as an essential component of plant cell membranes, a counterion for inorganic and organic anions in the vacuole, and an intracellular messenger in the cytosol, playing a role in cellular learning and memory.

== Magnesium ==
Magnesium is one of the dominant exchangeable cations in most soils (after calcium and potassium). Magnesium is an essential element for plants, microbes and animals, being involved in many catalytic reactions and in the synthesis of chlorophyll. Primary minerals that weather to release magnesium include hornblende, biotite and vermiculite. Soil magnesium concentrations are generally sufficient for optimal plant growth, but highly weathered and sandy soils may be magnesium deficient due to leaching by heavy precipitation.

== Sulfur ==
Most sulfur is made available to plants, like phosphorus, by its release from decomposing organic matter. Deficiencies may exist in some soils (especially sandy soils) and if cropped, sulfur needs to be added. The application of large quantities of nitrogen to fields that have marginal amounts of sulfur may cause sulfur deficiency by a dilution effect when stimulation of plant growth by nitrogen increases the plant demand for sulfur. Being mainly bonded to carbon, sulfur abundance decreases with depth according to a concomitant decrease in soil organic matter content.

== Micronutrients ==
The micronutrients essential in plant life, in their order of importance, include chlorine, iron, manganese, boron, zinc, copper, and molybdenum. The term refers to plants' needs, not to their abundance in soil. They are required in very small amounts but are essential to plant health in that most are required parts of enzyme systems which are involved in plant metabolism. They are generally available in the mineral component of the soil, but the heavy application of phosphates can cause a deficiency in zinc and iron by the formation of insoluble zinc and iron phosphates. Iron deficiency, stemming in plant chlorosis and rhizosphere acidification, may also result from excessive amounts of heavy metals or calcium minerals (lime) in the soil. Excess amounts of soluble boron, molybdenum and chloride are toxic.

== Non-essential nutrients ==
Nutrients which enhance the health but whose deficiency does not stop the life cycle of plants include: cobalt, strontium, vanadium, silicon and nickel. As their importance is evaluated they may be added to the list of essential plant nutrients, as is the case for silicon.

== See also ==
- Alkali soil
- Sodic soils
- Cation-exchange capacity
- Soil contamination
- Soil fertility
- Index of soil-related articles

== Bibliography ==
- "Arizona Master Gardener Manual". Arizona Cooperative Extension, College of Agriculture, University of Arizona.
- Stefferud, Alfred (1957). Soil: The Yearbook of Agriculture 1957 (PDF). United States Department of Agriculture. OCLC 704186906.
