= Tilth =

Health of soil, suitability for growing

Tilth is a physical condition of soil, especially in relation to its suitability for planting or growing a crop. Factors that determine tilth include the formation and stability of aggregated soil particles, moisture content, degree of aeration, soil biota, rate of water infiltration and drainage. Tilth can change rapidly, depending on environmental factors, such as changes in moisture, tillage and soil amendments. The objective of tillage (mechanical manipulation of the soil) is to improve tilth, thereby increasing crop production; in the long term, however, conventional tillage, especially plowing, often has the opposite effect, causing the soil carbon sponge to oxidize, break down and become compacted.

Soil with good tilth is spongy with large pore spaces for air infiltration and water movement. Roots grow only where the soil tilth allows for adequate levels of soil oxygen. Such soil also holds a reasonable supply of water and nutrients.

Tillage, organic matter amendments, fertilization and irrigation can each improve tilth, but when used excessively, can have the opposite effect. Crop rotation and cover crops can rebuild the soil carbon sponge and positively affect tilth. A combined approach can produce the greatest improvement.

== Aggregation ==
Good tilth shares a balanced relation between soil-aggregate tensile strength and friability, in which it has a stable mixture of aggregate soil particles that can be readily broken up by shallow, non-abrasive tilling. A high tensile strength will result in large cemented clods of compacted soil with low friability. Proper management of agricultural soils can positively affect soil aggregation and improve tilth quality.

Aggregation is positively associated with tilth. With finer-textured soils, aggregates may in turn be made up of smaller aggregates. Aggregation implies substantial pores between individual aggregates.

Aggregation is important in the subsoil, the layer below tillage. Such aggregates involve larger (2- to 6-inch) blocks of soil that are more angular and not as distinctive. These aggregates are less affected by biological activity than the tillage layer. Subsurface aggregates are important for root growth deep into the profile. Deep roots allow greater access to moisture, which helps in drought periods. Subsoil aggregates can also be compacted, mainly by heavy equipment on wet soil. Another significant source of subsoil compaction is the practice of plowing with tractor wheels in the open furrow.

== Pore size ==
Soil that is well aggregated has a range of pore sizes. Each pore size plays a role in soil's physical functioning. Large pores drain rapidly and are needed for good air exchange during wet periods, preventing oxygen deficiency that can drown plants and increase pest problems. Oxygen-deficient wet soils increase denitrification – conversion of nitrogen to gaseous forms. In degraded soil, large pores are compressed into small ones.

Small pores are critical for water retention and help a crop endure dry periods with minimal yield loss.

== Management ==
Soil tilth is naturally maintained by the interaction of plant roots with the soil biota.

Short lived tilth can be obtained through mechanical and biological manipulation.

=== Tillage ===
In 2021, the globally tilled soil volume was estimated at 1840 km^{3}/yr. This value exceeds by two orders of magnitude the global total of all engineering earthworks. For comparison globally, the natural process of soil bioturbation by plant roots and earthworms, was estimated at 960 km^{3}/yr.

Mechanical soil cultivation practices, including primary tillage (mold-board or chisel plowing) followed by secondary tillage (disking, harrowing, etc.), break up and aerate soil. Mechanical traffic and intensive tilling methods have a negative impact on soil aggregates, friability, soil porosity, and soil-bulk density. When soils become degraded and compacted, such tillage practices are often deemed necessary. The tilth created by tillage, however, tends to be unstable, because the aggregation is obtained through the physical manipulation of the soil, which is short lived, especially after years of intensive tillage.

The compaction of soil aggregates can also decrease soil biota due to the low levels of oxygen in the top-soil. The resulting high soil-bulk density results in lower water infiltration from rainfall or conventional irrigation (surface, sprinkler, center-pivot); in turn, the series of processes will naturally erode and dissolve small soil particles and organic matter. The consequences from these processes cyclically require more tilling and intervention, thus tillage practices have the capability to disrupt biological mechanisms that stabilize soil structure, the soil carbon sponge and tilth quality.

=== Biological ===
The preferred scenario for good tilth is as the result of natural soil-building processes, provided by the activity of plant roots, microorganisms, earthworms and other beneficial organisms. Such stable aggregates break apart during tillage/planting and readily provide good tilth.

Soil biota and organic matter work in unison to bind soil aggregates and establish a natural soil stability – a soil carbon sponge. Plant root exudates feed bacteria that emit extracellular polysaccharides (EPS), and feed the growth of fungal hyphae, to form a soil carbon sponge with the dispersed clay particles. These active tilth-forming processes contribute to the formation and stabilization of soil structure.

The resulting soil structure reduces tensile strength and soil-bulk density while still forming soil aggregates through their abiotic/biotic binding mechanisms that resist breakdown during water saturation. The fungal hyphae networks can establish a role of enmeshment with EPS and rhizodeposition, thus improving aggregate stability. However, these organic materials are themselves subject to biological degradation, requiring active amendments with organic material, and minimal mechanical tillage.

Tilth quality is heavily dependent on these naturally binding processes between biotic microorganisms and abiotic soil particles, as well as the necessary input of organic matter. All constituents in this naturally binding network must be supplied or managed in agriculture to ensure the sustainability of their presence through growing seasons.

=== Rotation ===
Crop rotation can help restore tilth in compacted soils. Two processes contribute to this gain. First, accelerated organic matter decomposition from tillage ends under the sod crop. Another way to achieve this is via no-till farming. Second, grass and legume sods develop extensive root systems that continually grow and die off. The dead roots supply a source of active organic matter, which feeds soil organisms that create aggregation – the soil carbon sponge. Beneficial organisms need continual supplies of organic matter to sustain themselves and they deposit the digested materials on soil aggregates and thereby stabilize them. Also, the living roots and symbiotic microorganisms (for example, mycorrhizal fungi) can exude organic materials that nourish soil organisms and help with aggregation. Grass and legume sod crops therefore deposit more organic matter in the soil than most other crops.

Some annual rotation crops, such as buckwheat, also have dense, fibrous, root systems and can improve tilth. Crop mixtures with different rooting systems can be beneficial. For example, red clover seeded into winter wheat provides additional roots and a more protein-rich soil organic matter.

Other rotation crops are more valuable for improving subsoils. Perennial crops, such as alfalfa, have strong, deep, penetrating tap roots that can push through hard layers, especially during wet periods when the soil is soft. These deep roots establish pathways for water and future plant roots, and produce soil organic matter.

Crops rotation can extend the period of active growth compared to conventional row crops, leaving more organic material behind. For example, in a corn–soybean rotation, active growth occurs 32% of the time, while a dry bean–winter wheat–corn rotation is active 72% of the time. Crops such as rye, wheat, oat, barley, pea and cool-season grasses grow actively in the late fall and early spring when other crops are inactive. They are beneficial both as rotation and cover crops, although intensive tillage can negate their effects.

== Soil types ==
The soil management practices required to maintain soil tilth are a function of the soil type. Sandy and gravelly soils are naturally deficient in small pores and are therefore drought-prone, whereas loams and clays can retain and thus supply crops with more water.

=== Coarse-textured, sandy soils ===
Sandy soil has a lower capacity to hold water and nutrients. Water is frequently applied in smaller amounts to avoid leaching and carrying nutrients below the root zone. Routine application of organic matter increases sandy soil's ability to hold water and nutrients by 10 times or more.

=== Fine-textured, clay soils ===
Clay soils lack large pores, restricting both water and air movement. During irrigation or rain events, the limited large pore space in fine-textured soils quickly fills with water, reducing soil oxygen levels. In addition to routine application of organic matter, microorganisms and earthworms perform a crucial role in soil tilth. As microorganisms decompose the organic matter, soil particles bind into larger aggregates, increasing large pore space. Clay soils are more subject to soil compaction, which reduces large pore spaces.

=== Gravelly and decomposed granite soils ===
Such soils natively have little tilth, especially once they have been disturbed. Adding organic matter up to 25% by volume can help compensate. For example, if tilling to a depth of eight inches, add two inches of organic materials.

== See also ==
- Effective microorganisms
- Korean natural farming
- Natural farming
- Permaculture
