= Ellsworthite =

Rare earth mineral

Uranpyrochlore (of Hogarth 1977)

General
- Category: Pyrochlore group
- Formula: (Ca,U)_{2}(Ti,Nb,Ta)_{2}O_{6}(OH)
- Crystal system: isometric
- Space group: Cubic 4/m 3* 2/m

Identification
- Color: amber yellow to dark brown; translucent or opaque
- Cleavage: None
- Fracture: conchoidal fracture
- Mohs scale hardness: 5.5
- Luster: vitreous
- Streak: yellow to brownish
- Other characteristics: Radioactive

Uranpyrochlore (of Hogarth 1977), also known as ellsworthite or betafite (Ca,U)_{2}(Ti,Nb,Ta)_{2}O_{6}(OH), is a rare earth mineral mostly found in the northern parts of North America. It is a uranpyrochlore and is named after Hardy V. Ellsworth of the Canadian Geological Survey by Walker and Parsons. It is a very uranium- and thorium- rich mineral, which in fact makes it slightly radioactive. Uranium makes up about 17.1% of the mineral. Ellsworthite is also known as the mineral Betafite. Ellsworthite is a thorium-bearing mineral that is found mostly in Canada and Alaska. It was first discovered in Hybla, Ontario, which is now a ghost town.

== Composition ==
Ellsworthite has complex hydrous oxides of niobium, tantalum, sodium, calcium, with hydroxyl and fluorine; it may contain as much as 17% uranium.

== Structure ==
The structure of ellsworthite is cubic and has a point group of 4/m 3* 2/m. It is part of the isometric system and has the space group Fd3m. It forms into a Hexoctahedral with {110}, {100}, {113}, {233}, and {230}.

== Sources ==
- Bulletin of the National Research Council, Number 77, Physics of the Earth - I Volcanology, By the Subsidiary Committee on Volcanology, Published by the National Research Council of The National Academy of Sciences Washington, D.C., (1931)
