= Slaking =

Slaking may refer to:

- Slaking (geology), the process in which earth materials disintegrate and crumble when exposed to moisture.
- Slaking (Pokémon), a species from the Pokémon video games and anime.
