= Residual sodium carbonate index =

The residual sodium carbonate (RSC) index of irrigation water or soil water is used to indicate the alkalinity hazard for soil. The RSC index is used to find the suitability of the water for irrigation in clay soils which have a high cation exchange capacity. When dissolved sodium in comparison with dissolved calcium and magnesium is high in water, clay soil swells or undergoes dispersion which drastically reduces its infiltration capacity.

In the dispersed soil structure, the plant roots are unable to spread deeper into the soil due to lack of moisture. However, high RSC index water does not enhance the osmotic pressure to impede the off take of water by the plant roots unlike high salinity water. Clay soils irrigation with high RSC index water leads to fallow alkali soils formation.

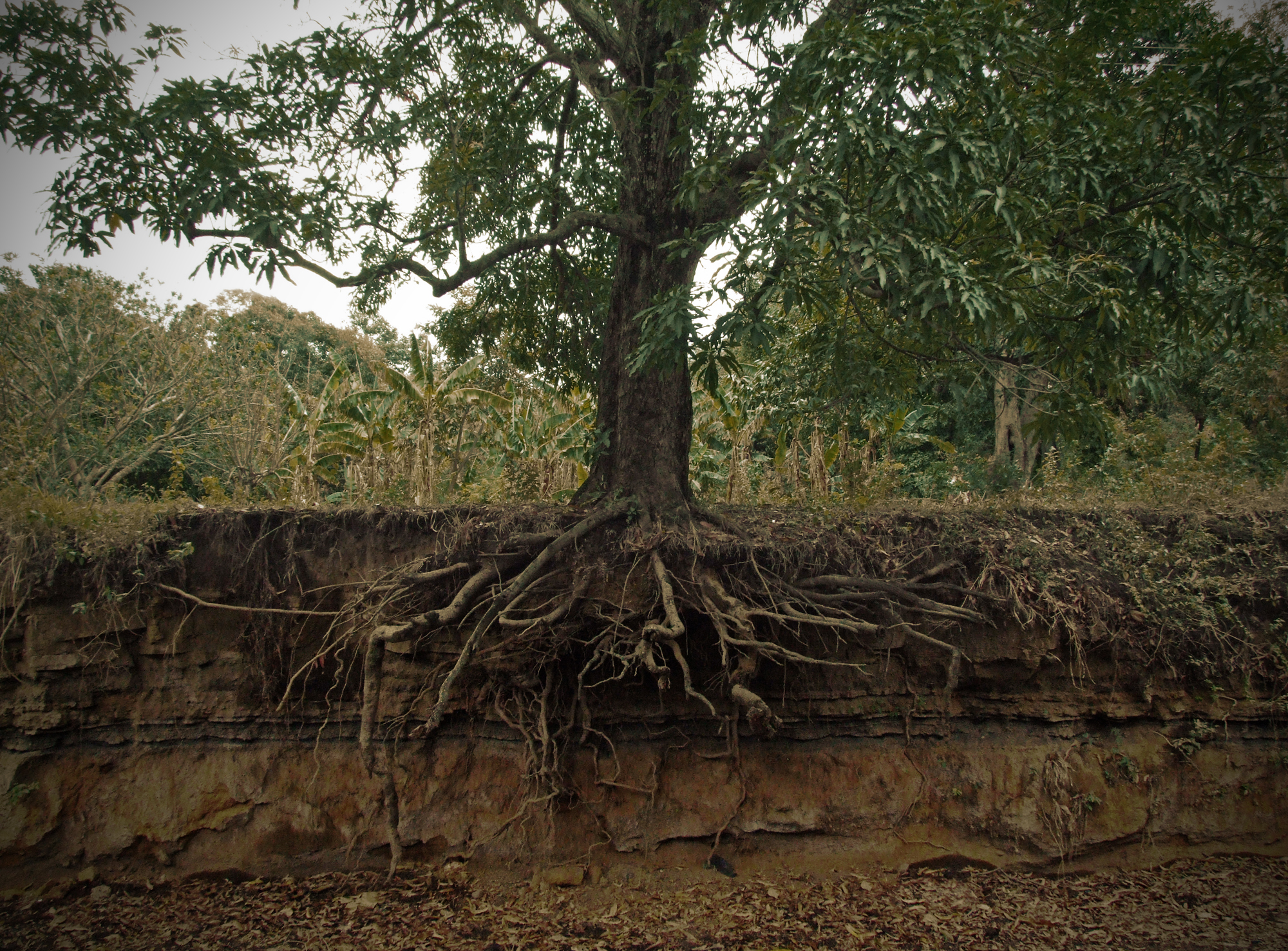
Cross section of a mango tree with shallow roots in partially formed alkali soil

== RSC index formula ==
RSC is expressed in meq/L units. RSC should not be higher than 1 and preferably less than +0.5 for considering the water use for irrigation. The formula for calculating RSC index is:

- RSC index = [HCO_{3} + CO_{3}] − [Ca + Mg]
- RSC index = HCO_{3}/61 + CO_{3}/30 – Ca/20 – Mg/12 (in case the ionic concentrations are measured in mg/L or ppm as salts)

While calculating RSC index, the water quality present at the root zone of the crop should be considered which would take into account the leaching factor in the field. Calcium present in dissolved form is also influenced by the partial pressure of dissolved CO_{2} at the plants root zone in the field water.

== Natural water contamination ==
Global variation in soil pH. Acidic Neutral Alkaline No data

Soda ash [Na_{2}CO_{3}] can be present in natural water from the weathering of basalt which is an igneous rock. Lime [Ca(OH)_{2}] can be present in natural water when rain water comes in contact with calcined minerals such as ash produced from the burning of calcareous coal or lignite in boilers. Anthropogenic use of soda ash also finally adds to the RSC of the river water.

Where the river water and ground water are repeatedly used in the extensively irrigated river basins, the river water available in lower reaches is often rendered not useful in agriculture due to high RSC index or alkalinity. The salinity of water need not be high.

== Softened water ==
In industrial water treatment terminology, water quality with high RSC index is synonymous with the soft water but is chemically very different from naturally soft water which has a very low ionic concentration. When calcium and magnesium salts are present in dissolved form in water, these salts precipitate on the heat transfer surfaces forming insulating hard scaling / coating which reduces the heat transfer efficiency of the heat exchangers. To avoid scaling in water cooled heat exchangers, water is treated by lime and or soda ash to remove the water hardness.

The following chemical reactions take place in lime soda softening process which precipitates the calcium and magnesium salts as calcium carbonate and magnesium hydroxide which have very low solubility in water.

- CaSO_{4} + Na_{2}CO_{3} → CaCO_{3}↓ + Na_{2}SO_{4}
- CaCl_{2} + Na_{2}CO_{3} → CaCO_{3}↓ + 2NaCl
- MgSO_{4} + Ca(OH)_{2} + Na_{2}CO_{3} → Mg(OH)_{2}↓ + CaCO_{3}↓ + Na_{2}SO_{4}
- MgCl_{2} + Ca(OH)_{2} + Na_{2}CO_{3} → Mg(OH)_{2}↓ + CaCO_{3}↓ + 2NaCl
- 2NaHCO_{3} + Ca(OH)_{2} → CaCO_{3}↓ + Na_{2}CO_{3} + 2H_{2}O
- Na_{2}CO_{3} + Ca(OH)_{2} → CaCO_{3}↓ + 2NaOH
- Ca(HCO_{3})_{2} + Ca(OH)_{2} → 2CaCO_{3}↓ + 2H_{2}O
- Mg(HCO_{3})_{2} + 2Ca(OH)_{2} → Mg(OH)_{2}↓ + 2CaCO_{3}↓ + 2H_{2}O
- MgCO_{3} + Ca(OH)_{2} → Mg(OH)_{2}↓ + CaCO_{3}↓

The excess soda ash after precipitating the calcium and magnesium salts is in carbonates & bicarbonates of sodium which imparts high pH or alkalinity to soil water.

== Soda lakes ==
The endorheic basin lakes are called soda or alkaline lakes when the water inflows contain high concentrations of Na_{2}CO_{3}. The pH of the soda lake water is generally above 9 and sometimes the salinity is close to brackish water due to depletion of pure water by solar evaporation.

Soda lakes are rich with algal growth due to enhanced availability of dissolved CO_{2} in the lake water compared to fresh water or saline water lakes. Sodium carbonate and sodium hydroxide are in equilibrium with availability of dissolved carbon dioxide as given below in the chemical reaction

- $\ce{Na2CO3 + H2O <=> 2NaOH + CO2}$
- $\ce{NaHCO3 <=> NaOH + CO2}$

During day time when sun light is available, Algae undergoes photosynthesis process which absorbs CO_{2} to shift the reaction towards NaOH formation and vice versa takes place during night time with the release of CO_{2} from the respiration process of Algae towards Na_{2}CO_{3} and NaHCO_{3} formation. In soda lake waters, carbonates of sodium act as catalyst for the algae growth by providing favourable higher concentration of dissolved CO_{2} during the day time. Due to fluctuation in dissolved CO_{2}, the pH and alkalinity of the water also keep varying.

.

== See also ==
- Soil pH
- Environmental impact of irrigation
- Index of soil-related articles
- Agreti green vegetable
- Algae fuel
- Algaculture
- Gravitropism
