= Priming effect =

Priming effect may refer to:

- Priming (psychology)
- Priming effect (soil ecology).
