= Alkali soil =

Soil type with pH > 8.5

- Alkaline soils
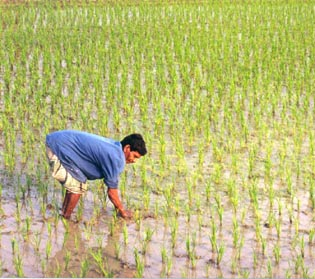
- Rice cultivation / paddyfield in alkali soils

Clay soil
- Key minerals: Sodium carbonate and sodium bicarbonate
- Key process: Lime softening
- pH: > 8.5

Alkali or alkaline soils are clay soils with high pH (generally greater than 8.5), often accompanied by poor soil structure and low infiltration capacity. They frequently have a hard calcareous layer 0.5 to 1 metre (1.6 to 3.3 ft) beneath the surface. Alkali soils owe their unfavorable physico-chemical properties mainly to the dominating presence of sodium carbonate, which causes the soil to swell and makes it difficult to clarify/settle. They derive their name from the alkali metal group of elements, to which sodium belongs, and which can induce basicity. Sometimes these soils are also referred to as alkaline sodic soils.

== Causes ==
The causes of soil alkalinity can be natural or man-made. The natural cause is the presence of soil minerals producing sodium carbonate (Na_{2}CO_{3}) and sodium bicarbonate (NaHCO_{3}) upon weathering.

Coal-fired boilers and power plants, when burning coal or lignite rich in limestone, produce a type of ash containing calcium oxide, known as fly ash. Calcium oxide readily dissolves in water to form slaked lime, Ca(OH)_{2}, an effluent which is carried by runoff to rivers and irrigation systems which it pollutes unless clean coal technologies such as IGCC achieve zero water discharge. The process of lime softening precipitates Ca^{2+} and Mg^{2+} ions and thereby removes hardness in the water and also converts sodium bicarbonates in river water into sodium carbonate. Sodium carbonates (washing soda) further reacts with the remaining Ca^{2+} and Mg^{2+} in the water to remove or precipitate the total hardness.

Numerous sodium salts are used in industrial and domestic applications in huge quantities, such as sodium carbonate, sodium bicarbonate (baking soda), sodium sulfate, sodium hydroxide (caustic soda), sodium hypochlorite (chlorine bleach), etc. These salts are mainly produced from sodium chloride (common salt). The sodium in these salts enters into surface waters or groundwater in the process of production or consumption, enhancing water sodicity. The total global consumption of sodium chloride was 280 million tons in the year 2020. Sodium salt load problems are particularly egregious in downstream areas of intensively cultivated river basins in China, India, Egypt, Pakistan, West Asia, Australia, the Western United States, etc., due to accumulation of salts in the remaining water after meeting various transpiration and evaporation losses.

Another source of man-made sodium salts addition to the land is the wet cooling towers that use seawater to dissipate waste heat generated in various industries located near the coast. High-capacity cooling towers are installed in oil refineries, petrochemical complexes, fertilizer plants, chemical plants, nuclear and thermal power stations, centralized HVAC systems, etc. The drift and fine droplets emitted from the cooling towers contain nearly 6% sodium chloride, which deposits on surfaces in the vicinity. This problem is exacerbated by the fact that national pollution control norms are not imposed or not implemented to minimize the drift emissions to the optimal industrial norm for seawater-based wet cooling towers.

By replacing calcium and magnesium with sodium softened water used in irrigation (surface or groundwater) dissolves soil organic matter and disperses clay mineral particles, resulting in poor soil structure and low infiltration capacity typical of alkali soils.

== Agricultural problems ==
Global variation in soil pH: blue denotes alkaline soils.

Alkaline soils are difficult to use for agriculture, with considerable areas being salt-affected worldwide. Due to the low infiltration capacity, rainwater tends to stagnate on the soil surface and evaporate before it can be used by plant crops, and in dry periods, cultivation is hardly possible without copious irrigation and good drainage. Agriculture in alkaline soils is therefore usually limited to crops tolerant to surface waterlogging (e.g. rice).

== Chemistry ==
Soil alkalinity is associated with the presence of sodium carbonate (Na_{2}CO_{3}) or sodium bicarbonate (NaHCO_{3}) in the soil, either as a result of natural weathering of the soil minerals or brought in by irrigation and/or flood water.

Sodium carbonate is extremely soluble. When it undergoes hydration, it dissociates into sodium cations and carbonate anions:

Na_{2}CO_{3} → 2 Na^{+} + CO^{2−}_{3}

The carbonate anion, CO^{2−}_{3}, is a weak base accepting a proton, so it hydrolyses in water to give the bicarbonate ion and a hydroxyl ion:

CO^{2−}_{3} + H_{2}O → HCO^{−}_{3} + OH^{−}

This in turn is susceptible to further hydrolysis, giving carbonic acid and another hydroxyl ion:

HCO^{−}_{3} + H_{2}O → H_{2}CO_{3} + OH^{−}

See carbonate for the carbonate-bicarbonate-carbon dioxide equilibrium.

The above reactions are similar to the dissolution of calcium carbonate, the solubility of the two salts being the only difference. Na_{2}CO_{3} is about 78000 times more soluble than CaCO_{3}, so it can dissolve far larger amounts of CO^{2−}_{3}, thus increasing pH to values higher than 8.5, which is above the maximum attainable pH when calcium carbonate and dissolved carbon dioxide are in equilibrium in the soil solution.

Notes:
- Water (H_{2}O) is partly dissociated into H_{3}O^{+} (hydronium) and OH^{–} (hydroxyl) ions. The ion H_{3}O^{+} has a positive electric charge (+) and its concentration is usually written as [H^{+}]. The hydroxyl ion OH^{–} has a negative charge (−) and its concentration is written as [OH^{−}].
- In pure water, at 25 °C, the dissociation constant of water (K_{w}) is 10^{−14}.
  Since K_{w} = [H^{+}] × [OH^{–}], then both the concentration of H_{3}O^{+} and OH^{–} ions equal 10^{−7} M (a very small concentration).
- In neutral water, the pH, being the negative decimal logarithm of the H_{3}O^{+} concentration, it is 7. Similarly, the pOH is also 7. Each unit decrease in pH indicates a tenfold increase of the H_{3}O^{+} concentration. Similarly, each unit increase in pH indicates a tenfold increase of the OH^{–} concentration.
- In water with dissolved salts, the concentrations of the H_{3}O^{+} and the OH^{–} ions may change, but their sum remains constant, namely 7 + 7 = 14. A pH of 7 therefore corresponds to a pOH of 7, and a pH of 9 with a pOH of 5.
- Formally it is preferred to express the ion concentrations in terms of chemical activity, but this hardly affects the value of the pH.
- Water with excess H_{3}O^{+} ions is called acid (pH < 7), and water with excess OH^{–} ions is called alkaline or basic (pH > 7). Soil moisture with pH < 4 is called very acid and with pH > 10 very alkaline (basic).

H_{2}CO_{3} (carbonic acid) is unstable and produces H_{2}O (water) and CO_{2} (carbon dioxide gas, escaping into the atmosphere). This explains the remaining alkalinity (or rather basicity) in the form of soluble sodium hydroxide and the high pH or low pOH of sodium carbonate solutions.

Not all of the dissolved sodium carbonate undergoes the above chemical reaction. The remaining sodium carbonate, and hence the presence of CO^{2−}_{3} ions, causes CaCO_{3} (which is only slightly soluble) to precipitate as solid calcium carbonate (limestone), because the product of the CO^{2−}_{3} concentration and the Ca^{2+} concentration exceeds the allowable limit. Hence, the calcium ions Ca^{2+} are immobilized.

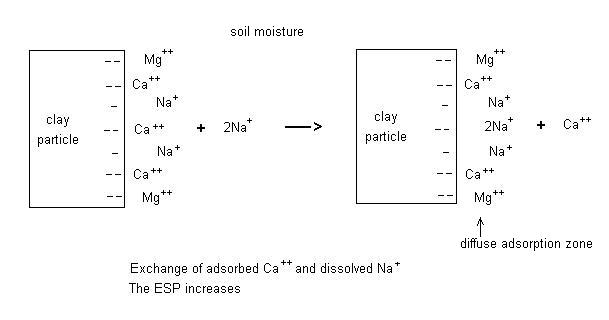
Sodium exchange process between ions adsorbed at the surface of clay particles and those in the soil moisture

The presence of abundant Na^{+} ions in the soil solution and the precipitation of Ca^{2+} ions as a solid mineral causes the clay particles, which have negative electric charges along their surfaces, to adsorb more Na^{+} in the diffuse adsorption zone (DAZ, also more commonly called diffuse double layer (DDL), or electrical double layer (EDL), see the corresponding figure) and, in exchange, release previously adsorbed Ca^{2+}, by which their exchangeable sodium percentage (ESP) is increased as illustrated in the same figure.

Na^{+} is more mobile and has a smaller electric charge than Ca^{2+} so that the thickness of the DDL increases as more sodium ions occupy it. The DDL thickness is also influenced by the total concentration of ions in the soil moisture in the sense that higher concentrations (as when the soil dries out) cause the DDL zone to shrink and clay particles to adhere more firmly: the soil becomes more compact and desiccation cracks appear.

Clay particles with considerable ESP (> 16), in contact with non-saline soil moisture have an expanded DDL zone and the soil swells (dispersion). The phenomenon results in deterioration of the soil structure, and especially crust formation and compaction of the top layer. Hence the infiltration capacity of the soil and the water availability in the soil is reduced, whereas the surface-waterlogging or surface runoff is increased. Seedling emergence and crop production are badly affected.

Note:
- Under saline conditions, the many ions in the soil solution counteract the swelling of the soil, so that saline soils usually do not have unfavorable physical properties. Alkaline soils, in principle, are not saline since the alkalinity problem is worse as the salinity is less.

Alkalinity problems are more pronounced in clay soils than in loamy, silty or sandy soils. The clay soils containing montmorillonite or smectite (swelling clays) are more subject to alkalinity problems than illite or kaolinite clay soils. The reason is that the former types of clay have larger specific surface areas (i.e. the surface area of the soil particles divided by their volume) and higher cation exchange capacity (CEC).

Note:
- Certain clay minerals with almost 100% 'exchangeable sodium percentage' (ESP) (i.e. almost fully sodium saturated) are called bentonite, which is used in civil engineering to place impermeable curtains in the soil, e.g. below dams, to prevent seepage of water.

The quality of the irrigation water in relation to the alkalinity hazard is expressed by the following two indexes:

1. The sodium adsorption ratio (SAR,) The formula for calculating sodium adsorption ratio is:
  SAR = ([Na^{+}])/(√[Ca^{2+}/2 + Mg^{2+}/2]) = ({Na^{+}/23})/(√{Ca^{2+}/40 + Mg^{2+}/24})
  where: [ ] stands for concentration in milliequivalents/liter (briefly meq/L), and { } stands for concentration in mg/L.
  It is seen that Mg (magnesium) is thought to play a similar role as Ca (calcium).
  The SAR should not be much higher than 20 and preferably less than 10;
  When the soil has been exposed to water with a certain SAR value for some time, the ESP value tends to become about equal to the SAR value.
2. The residual sodium carbonate (RSC, meq/L): The formula for calculating the residual sodium carbonate is:
  RSC	= [HCO^{−}_{3} + CO^{2−}_{3}] − [Ca^{2+} + Mg^{2+}]
  	= {HCO^{−}_{3}/61 + CO^{2−}_{3}/30} − {Ca^{2+}/20 + Mg^{2+}/12}
  which must not be much higher than 1 and preferably less than 0.5.
  The above expression recognizes the presence of bicarbonates (HCO^{−}_{3}), the form in which most carbonates are dissolved.

While calculating SAR and RSC, the water quality present at the root zone of the crop should be considered which would take into account the leaching factor in the field. The partial pressure of dissolved CO_{2} at the plants root zone also decides the calcium present in dissolved form in the field water. USDA follows the adjusted SAR for calculating water sodicity.

== Soil improvement ==
Alkaline soils with solid CaCO_{3} can be reclaimed with grass cultures, compost, waste hair/feathers, organic garbage, waste paper, rejected lemons/oranges, etc. ensuring the incorporation of much acidifying material (inorganic or organic material) into the soil, and enhancing dissolved Ca in the field water by releasing CO_{2} gas.

Many times salts' migration to the top soil takes place from underground water sources rather than surface sources. Where the underground water table is high and the land is subjected to high solar radiation, ground water oozes to the land surface due to capillary action and gets evaporated leaving the dissolved salts in the top layer of the soil. Where the underground water contains high salts, it leads to acute salinity problem. This problem can be reduced by applying mulch to the land. Using polyhouses or shade netting (protected cutivation) during summer is also advised to mitigate soil salinity and conserve soil moisture for cultivating vegetables and flowers. Polyhouses filter the intense summer solar radiation in tropical countries to save the plants from water stress and leaf burns.

Where ground water quality is neither alkaline or saline and the ground water table is high, salts build up in the soil can be averted by using the land throughout the year for growing plantation trees or permanent crops with the help of lift irrigation. When the ground water is used at required leaching factor, the salts in the soil would not build up.

Plowing the field soon after cutting the crop is also advised to prevent salt migration to the top soil and conserve the soil moisture during the intense summer months. This is done to break the capillary pores in the soil to prevent water reaching the surface of the soil.

Clay soils in high annual rainfall (more than 100 cm) areas do not generally suffer from high alkalinity as rainwater runoff is able to leach the soil salts to comfortable levels if proper rainwater harvesting methods are followed. In some agricultural areas, subsurface "tile lines" are used to facilitate drainage and leach salts. Continuous drip irrigation would lead to alkali soils formation in the absence of drainage of water from the field.

It is also possible to reclaim alkaline soils by adding acidifying minerals like pyrite or cheaper alum or aluminium sulfate.

Alternatively, gypsum (calcium sulfate, CaSO_{4} · 2 H_{2}O) can also be applied as a source of Ca^{2+} ions to replace the sodium at the exchange complex. Gypsum also reacts with sodium carbonate to convert into sodium sulphate which is a neutral salt and does not contribute to high pH. There must be enough natural drainage to the underground, or else an artificial subsurface drainage system must be present, to permit leaching of the excess sodium by percolation of rain and/or irrigation water through the soil profile.

Calcium chloride is also used to reclaim alkali soils. CaCl_{2} converts Na_{2}CO_{3} into NaCl precipitating CaCO_{3}. NaCl is drained off by leaching water. Calcium nitrate (a nitrogen fertilizer) has a similar effect, with NaNO_{3} in the leachate. Spent acids (HCl, H_{2}SO_{4}, etc.) can also be used to reduce the excess Na_{2}CO_{3} in the soil/water.

Where urea is made available cheaply to farmers, it is also used to reduce soil alkalinity/salinity primarily before being used as a fertilizer. The ammonium (NH^{+}_{4}) cation produced by urea hydrolysis which is a strongly sorbing cation exchanges with the weakly sorbing Na^{+} cation from the soil structure and Na^{+} is released into water. Thus alkali soils consume more urea compared to other soils, if we add ammonium sorption to ammonia volatilization.

To reclaim the soils completely one needs prohibitively high doses of amendments. Most efforts are therefore directed to improving the top layer only (say the first 10 cm of the soils), as the top layer is most sensitive to deterioration of the soil structure. The treatments, however, need to be repeated in a few (say 5) years' time, because of loss of applied substances through leaching (for mineral amendments) or decomposition (for organic amendments) processes, except when stabilized by mixing them with highly stable susbtrates (e.g. biochar). Trees following gravitropism for the growth of their root systems, it is thus difficult for them to survive in alkali soils, deep soil remediation being mandatory before planting selected species (e.g. Acacia, Eucalyptus)) which will be in turn able to improve soil properties.

It will be important to refrain from irrigation (groundwater or surface water) with poor quality water. In viticulture, adding naturally occurring chelating agents such as tartaric acid to irrigation water has been suggested, to solubilize calcium and magnesium carbonates in sodic soils.

One way of reducing sodium carbonate is to cultivate halophytes such as glasswort or saltwort or barilla plants, a process called phytoremediation. Halophytes sequester the sodium carbonate they absorb from alkali soil into their tissues. The ash of these plants contains good quantity of sodium carbonate (known as soda) which can be commercially extracted in place of sodium carbonate derived from common salt which is highly energy intensive process. This property of halophyte ashes has been used for millenaries in the production of glass, hence the name glasswort given to various halophyte species. Thus alkali lands deterioration can be checked by cultivating barilla plants which can serve as food source, biomass fuel and raw material for soda ash and potash, etc.

=== Leaching saline sodic soils ===
Saline soils are mostly also sodic (the predominant salt is sodium chloride), but they do not have a very high pH nor a poor infiltration rate, because they have a good structure. Upon leaching they are usually not converted into a (sodic) alkali soil as the Na^{+} ions are easily removed. Therefore, saline (sodic) soils mostly do not need gypsum applications for their reclamation.

== Remediation and utilization via aquaculture ==
While traditional reclamation often requires extensive chemical amendments and drainage infrastructure, aquaculture offers an alternative or complementary strategy by using water bodies to leach salts and problematic soil compounds, introduce organic matter, and create conditions for biological soil improvement. Since the 1990s, research and experimentation have been conducted in China and elsewhere for remediation and utilization of alkali land via combined agriculture and aquaculture practices, with considerable success and gains in experience. Despite technical, infrastructure and management challenges, aquaculture technology of utilizing inland saline-alkali water and non-arable land for seafood production is becoming mature, covering a wide range of seafood species including shrimps, crabs, shellfish and fish such as sea bass and grouper.

In recent years, aquaculture (or salt-alkali land aquaculture) has been recommended by the Ministry of Agriculture and Rural Affairs of China as an economically viable and environmentally beneficial model for the transformation and utilization of saline-alkali land. FAO noted in a recent newsletter that alkaline land is one area where there are innovative ways and opportunities for aquaculture to expand.

In late 2025, a prestigious award established at the China Society of Fisheries was presented to several leading Chinese institutes and organizations responsible for the innovation and commercialization of integrated technology for salt reduction and alkali control in saline-alkali lands through aquaculture, in accordance to the revised Fisheries Law passed on 27 December 2025 and come into force on 1 May 2026.

== See also ==
- Ammonia volatilization from urea
- Agreti green vegetable
- Barilla
- Biosalinity
- Cation-exchange capacity
- Drip irrigation
- Environmental impact of irrigation
- Fertilizer
- Halotolerance
- Index of soil-related articles
- Phosphate rich organic manure
- Phosphogypsum
- Red mud
- Residual Sodium Carbonate Index
- Sajji Khar
- Soda lake
- Soil fertility
- Soil pH
- Soil salinity
- Soil salinity control
