= Remineralisation =

Breakdown of organic matter to simple chemicals by living organisms

In biogeochemistry, remineralisation (or remineralization) refers to the breakdown or transformation of organic matter (those molecules derived from a biological source) into its simplest inorganic forms. These transformations form a crucial link within ecosystems as they are responsible for liberating the energy stored in organic molecules and recycling matter within the system to be reused as nutrients by other organisms.

Remineralisation is normally viewed as it relates to the cycling of the major biologically important elements such as carbon, nitrogen and phosphorus. While crucial to all ecosystems, the process receives special consideration in aquatic settings, where it forms a significant link in the biogeochemical dynamics and cycling of aquatic ecosystems.

== Role in biogeochemistry ==
The term "remineralization" is used in several contexts across different disciplines. The term is most commonly used in the medicinal and physiological fields, where it describes the development or redevelopment of mineralized structures in organisms such as teeth or bone. In the field of biogeochemistry, however, remineralization is used to describe a link in the chain of elemental cycling within a specific ecosystem. In particular, remineralization represents the point where organic material constructed by living organisms is broken down into basal inorganic components that are not obviously identifiable as having come from an organic source. This differs from the process of decomposition which is a more general descriptor of larger structures degrading to smaller structures.

Biogeochemists study this process across all ecosystems for a variety of reasons. This is done primarily to investigate the flow of material and energy in a given system, which is key to understanding the productivity of that ecosystem along with how it recycles material versus how much is entering the system. Understanding the rates and dynamics of organic matter remineralization in a given system can help in determining how or why some ecosystems might be more productive than others.

=== Remineralization reactions ===
While the process of remineralization is a series of complex biochemical pathways [within microbes], it can often be simplified as a series of one-step processes for ecosystem-level models and calculations. A generic form of these reactions is shown by:

$$\ce{{Organic \ Matter} + Oxidant -> {Liberated\ Simple\ Nutrients} + \underset{Carbon~Dioxide}{CO2} + \underset{Water}{H2O}}$$

The above generic equation starts with two reactants: some piece of organic matter (composed of organic carbon) and an oxidant. Most organic carbon exists in a reduced form which is then oxidized by the oxidant (such as O_{2}) into CO_{2} and energy that can be harnessed by the organism. This process generally produces CO_{2}, water and a collection of simple nutrients like nitrate or phosphate that can then be taken up by other organisms. The above general form, when considering O_{2} as the oxidant, is the equation for respiration. In this context specifically, the above equation represents bacterial respiration though the reactants and products are essentially analogous to the short-hand equations used for multi-cellular respiration.

=== Electron acceptor cascade ===
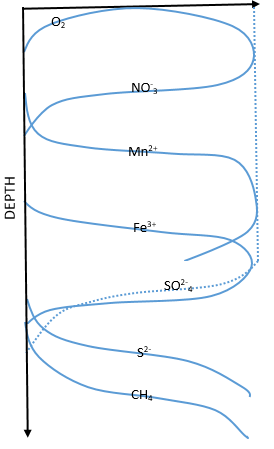
Sketch of major electron acceptors in marine sediment porewater based on idealized relative depths

The degradation of organic matter through respiration in the modern ocean is facilitated by different electron acceptors, their favorability based on Gibbs free energy law, and the laws of thermodynamics. This redox chemistry is the basis for life in deep sea sediments and determines the obtainability of energy to organisms that live there. From the water interface moving toward deeper sediments, the order of these acceptors is oxygen, nitrate, manganese, iron, and sulfate. The zonation of these favored acceptors can be seen in Figure 1. Moving downwards from the surface through the zonation of these deep ocean sediments, acceptors are used and depleted. Once depleted the next acceptor of lower favorability takes its place. Thermodynamically, oxygen represents the most favorable electron acceptor but is quickly used up in the water sediment interface and O_{2} concentrations extends only millimeters to centimeters down into the sediment in most locations of the deep sea. This favorability indicates an organism's ability to obtain higher energy from the reaction which helps them compete with other organisms. In the absence of these acceptors, organic matter can also be degraded through methanogenesis, but the net oxidation of this organic matter is not fully represented by this process. Each pathway and the stoichiometry of its reaction are listed in table 1.

Due to this quick depletion of O_{2} in the surface sediments, a majority of microbes use anaerobic pathways to metabolize other oxides such as manganese, iron, and sulfate. It is also important to figure in bioturbation and the constant mixing of this material which can change the relative importance of each respiration pathway. For the microbial perspective please reference the electron transport chain.

== Remineralisation in sediments ==
=== Reactions ===
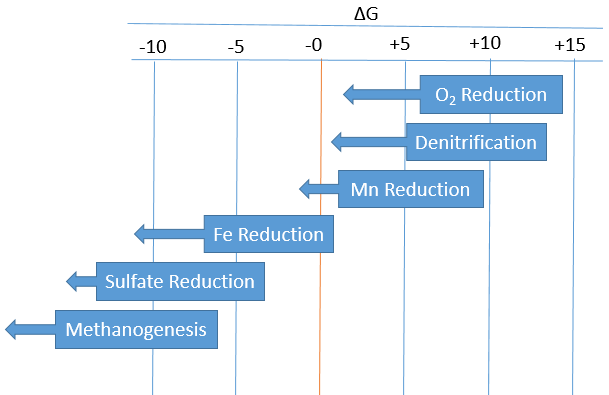
Relative favorability of reduction reactions in marine sediments based on thermodynamic energetics. Origin of arrows indicate energy associated with half-cell reaction. Length of arrow indicates an estimate of ΔG for the reaction (Adapted from Libes, 2011).

A quarter of all organic material that exits the photic zone makes it to the seafloor without being remineralised and 90% of that remaining material is remineralised in sediments itself. Once in the sediment, organic remineralisation may occur through a variety of reactions. The following reactions are the primary ways in which organic matter is remineralised, in them general organic matter (OM) is often represented by the shorthand: (CH_{2}O)_{106}(NH_{3})_{16}(H_{3}PO_{4}).

==== Aerobic respiration ====
Aerobic respiration is the most preferred remineralisation reaction due to its high energy yield. Although oxygen is quickly depleted in the sediments and is generally exhausted centimeters from the sediment-water interface.

==== Anaerobic respiration ====
In instances in which the environment is suboxic or anoxic, organisms will prefer to utilize denitrification to remineralise organic matter as it provides the second largest amount of energy. In depths below where denitrification is favored, reactions such as Manganese Reduction, Iron Reduction, Sulfate Reduction, Methane Reduction (also known as Methanogenesis), become favored respectively. This favorability is governed by Gibbs Free Energy (ΔG). In a water body, sediment seabed, or soil, the sorting of these chemical reactions with depth in order of energy provided is called a redox gradient.

| Respiration type | Reaction | | ΔG |
|---|---|---|---|
| Aerobic | Oxygen reduction | $\ce{OM + 150O2 -> 106CO2 + 16HNO3 + H3PO4 + 78H2O}$ | -29.9 |
| Anaerobic | Denitrification | $\ce{OM + 104HNO3 -> 106CO2 + 60N2 + H3PO4 + 138H2O}$ | -28.4 |
| Anaerobic | Manganese reduction | $\ce{OM + 260MnO2 + 174H2O -> 106CO2 + 8N2 + H3PO4 + 260Mn(OH)2}$ | -7.2 |
| Anaerobic | Iron reduction | $\ce{OM + 236Fe2O3 + 410H2O -> 106CO2 + 16NH3 + H3PO4 + 472Fe(OH)2}$ | -21.0 |
| Anaerobic | Sulfate reduction | $\ce{OM + 59H2SO4 -> 106CO2 + 16NH3 + H3PO4 + 59H2S + 62H2O}$ | -6.1 |
| Anaerobic | Methane fermentation (Methanogenesis) | $\ce{OM + 59H2O -> 47CO2 + 59CH4 + 16NH3 + H3PO4}$ | -5.6 |

=== Redox zonation ===
Redox zonation refers to how the processes that transfer terminal electrons as a result of organic matter degradation vary depending on time and space. Certain reactions will be favored over others due to their energy yield as detailed in the energy acceptor cascade detailed above. In oxic conditions, in which oxygen is readily available, aerobic respiration will be favored due to its high energy yield. Once the use of oxygen through respiration exceeds the input of oxygen due to bioturbation and diffusion, the environment will become anoxic and organic matter will be broken down via other means, such as denitrification and manganese reduction.

== Remineralisation in the open ocean ==
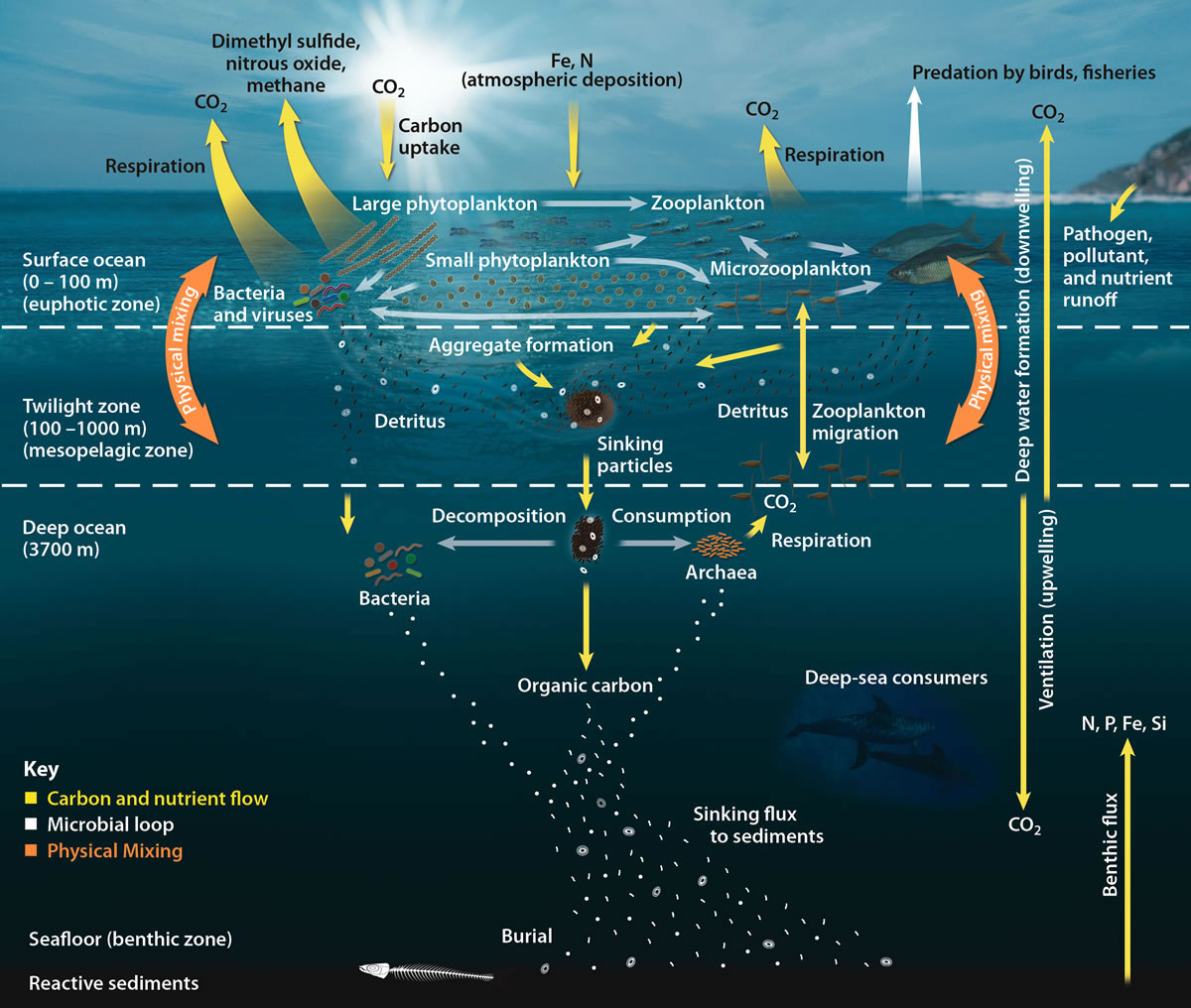
Food web showing the flow of carbon in the open ocean

In most open ocean ecosystems only a small fraction of organic matter reaches the seafloor. Biological activity in the photic zone of most water bodies tends to recycle material so well that only a small fraction of organic matter ever sinks out of that top photosynthetic layer. Remineralisation within this top layer occurs rapidly and due to the higher concentrations of organisms and the availability of light, those remineralised nutrients are often taken up by autotrophs just as rapidly as they are released.

What fraction does escape varies depending on the location of interest. For example, in the North Sea, values of carbon deposition are ~1% of primary production while that value is <0.5% in the open oceans on average. Therefore, most of nutrients remain in the water column, recycled by the biota. Heterotrophic organisms will utilize the materials produced by the autotrophic (and chemotrophic) organisms and via respiration will remineralise the compounds from the organic form back to inorganic, making them available for primary producers again.

For most areas of the ocean, the highest rates of carbon remineralisation occur at depths between 100–1,200 m (330–3,940 ft) in the water column, decreasing down to about 1,200 m where remineralisation rates remain pretty constant at 0.1 μmol kg^{−1} yr^{−1}. As a result of this, the pool of remineralised carbon (which generally takes the form of carbon dioxide) tends to increase in the aphotic zone.

Most remineralisation is done with dissolved organic carbon (DOC). Studies have shown that it is larger sinking particles that transport matter down to the sea floor while suspended particles and dissolved organics are mostly consumed by remineralisation. This happens in part due to the fact that organisms must typically ingest nutrients smaller than they are, often by orders of magnitude. With the microbial community making up 90% of marine biomass, it is particles smaller than the microbes (on the order of 10^{−6}) that will be taken up for remineralisation.

== See also ==
- Biological pump
- Decomposition
- f-ratio
- John D. Hamaker (soil remineralisation)
- Mineralization (biology)
- Mineralization (soil science)
- Immobilization (soil science)
