= Phosphate rich organic manure =

Type of fertilizer

Phosphate rich organic manure is a type of fertilizer used as an alternative to diammonium phosphate and single super phosphate.

Phosphorus is required by all plants but is limited in soil, creating a problem in agriculture In many areas phosphorus must be added to soil for the extensive plant growth that is desired for crop production. Phosphorus was first added as a fertilizer in the form of single super phosphate in the mid-nineteenth century, following research at Rothamsted Experimental Station in England. Single super phosphate is non-nitrogen fertiliser containing phosphate in the form of monocalcium phosphate and gypsum which is best suited for alkali soils to supplement phosphate and reduce soil alkalinity.

The world consumes around 140 million tons of high grade rock phosphate mineral today, 90% of which goes into the production of diammonium phosphate. Excess application of chemical fertilizers in fact reduces the agricultural production as chemicals destroy natural soil flora and fauna. When diammonium or single super phosphate is applied to the soil only about 30% of the phosphorus is used by the plants, while the rest is converted to forms which cannot be used by the crops, a phenomenon known as the phosphate problem to soil scientists.

Phosphate rich organic manure is produced by co-composting high-grade (32% P_{2}O_{5} +/- 2%) rock phosphate in very fine size (say 80% finer than 54 microns). The finer the rock phosphate, the better is the agronomic efficiency of Phosphate rich organic manure. Research indicates that this substance may be a more efficient way of adding phosphorus to soil than applying chemical fertilizers. Other benefits of phosphate rich organic manure are that it supplies phosphorus to the second crop planted in a treated area as efficiently as the first, and that it can be produced using acidic waste solids recovered from the discharge of biogas plants.

Phosphorus in rock phosphate mineral is mostly in the form of tricalcium phosphate, which is water-insoluble. Phosphorus dissolution in the soil is most favorable at a pH between 5.5 and 7. Ions of aluminum, iron, and manganese prevent phosphorus dissolution by keeping local pH below 5.5, and magnesium and calcium ions prevent the pH from dropping below 7, preventing the release of phosphorus from its stable molecule. Microorganisms produce organic acids, which cause the slow dissolution of phosphorus from rock phosphate dust added to the soil, allowing more phosphorus uptake by the plant roots. Organic manure can prevent ions of other elements from locking phosphorus into insoluble forms. The phosphorus in phosphate enhanced organic manure is water-insoluble, so it does not leach into ground water or enter runoff ^{[x]}

Most phosphate rocks can be used for phosphate rich organic manure. It was previously thought that only those rocks which have citric acid soluble phosphate and those of sedimentary origin could be used. Rocks of volcanic origin can be used as long as they are ground to very fine size.

Organic manure should be properly prepared for use in agriculture, reducing the C:N ratio to 30:1 or lower. Alkaline and acidic soils require different ratios of phosphorus.

Phosphate rich organic manure is known as a green chemistry phosphatic fertilizer. Addition of natural minerals or synthetic oxides in water-insoluble forms that contain micronutrients such as copper, zinc, and cobalt may improve the efficiency of phosphate rich organic manure. Using natural sources of nitrogen, such as azolla, may be more environmentally sound.

== Phosphate rich organic Manure under the Fertilizer Control Order ==
The Ministry of Agriculture and Cooperation of the Government of India has approved phosphate rich organic manure and included it under the Fertilizer Control Order. The approved specifications may be seen from Gazette Notification from the website of PROM Society.
