= Soil aggregate stability =

Property of soil

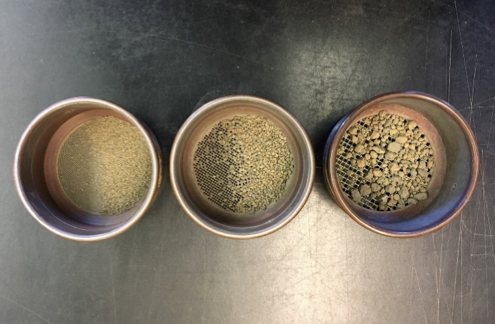
Soil sieve nests with dry soil aggregates after removal from a laboratory drying oven

Soil aggregate stability is a measure of the ability of soil aggregates—soil particles that bind together—to resist breaking apart when exposed to external forces such as water erosion and wind erosion, shrinking and swelling processes, and tillage. Soil aggregate stability is a measure of soil structure and can be affected by soil management.

== Overview ==
Aggregate stability is one of indicators of soil quality, as it combines soil physical, chemical, and biological properties. The formation of soil aggregates (or so-called secondary soil particles or peds) occurs due to interactions of primary soil particles (i.e., clay) through rearrangement, flocculation and cementation.

Aggregate stability has a direct impact on soil pore size distribution, which affects soil water retention and water movement in soil, therefore affecting air movement. A soil with good soil structure typically has a mix of micro-, meso-, and macropores. Therefore, with more aggregation, you would expect to have a higher total porosity compared to a poorly aggregated soil. Micropores are important for water retention and storage in soils, while macro- and mesopores allow for the movement of water and air into the soil. A well aerated soil is important for plant and microbial health. Without access to oxygen, plant roots and aerobic microorganisms are unable to respire, and can die. To have a high biodiversity of soil organisms it is important to have a mix of different pore sizes and habitats in the soil. Soil pores create space in the soil that allows for root penetrability. In a compacted soil with few aggregates and limited pore spaces, roots have difficulty growing and may be excluded from nutrients and water stored in different parts of the soil. Soils with good aggregate stability typically have a higher water infiltration rate, allowing more water into the soil profile faster, and are not susceptible to water ponding.

== Factors Affecting Aggregate Formation ==
Soil aggregates are formed due to flocculation and cementation processes, and are enhanced by physical and biological processes. Primary soil particles (sand, silt, and clay) are subjected to these processes, and can stick together to form larger sub-microaggregates (< 250 μm), microaggregates, and macroaggregates (> 250 μm). It has been suggested that soil aggregates form hierarchically, meaning larger less dense aggregates are composed of smaller more dense aggregates.

=== Flocculation ===
Flocculation refers to a state when primary soil particles (sand, silt, and clay) are drawn to each other by inter-particle forces to create microscopic floccules (or clumps). Inter-particle forces include: van der Waals forces, electrostatic forces, and hydrogen bonding. This is the opposite of dispersion, which occurs when individual primary soil particles are held apart. Soil particle dispersion and flocculation are mainly controlled by the soil pH, electrical conductivity (EC), and sodium content.

=== Cementation ===
Microscopic floccules, will become aggregates once they are stabilized through cementation by one or several cementing agents such as carbonates, gypsum, sesquioxides, clay particles, and organic matter.

==== Carbonates and Gypsum ====
Calcium carbonate (CaCO_{3}), magnesium carbonate (MgCO_{3}), and gypsum (CaSO_{4}^{.}2H_{2}O) can enhance soil aggregation when associated with clay minerals. The calcium ion (Ca^{2+}), through its cationic bridging effect on flocculation of clay and organic matter compounds, has a crucial role in the formation and stability of soil aggregates. Calcium can exchange with sodium on exchange sites. This, in turn, reduces soil particle dispersion, surface crusting, and aggregate slaking associated with sodic soils and indirectly increase aggregate stability.

==== Sesquioxides ====
Iron and aluminum hydrous oxides (or sesquioxides) can act as a cementing agents to form aggregates >100 μm, this effect becomes more pronounced in soil containing >10% sesquioxides. Sesquioxides act as stabilizing agents for aggregates because iron and aluminum in solution act as flocculants (i.e., bridging cations between negatively charged soil particles), and sesquioxides have potential to precipitate as gel on clay particles.

==== Clay Particles ====
Soil clay particles have varying effects on aggregate formation, depending on its type. Soil with 2:1 type of phyllosilicate clay minerals (e.g., montmoriollinite) typically have high cation exchange capacity (CEC), which allows them to bind with polyvalently charged organic matter complexes to form microaggregates. Soil organic matter is therefore the main binding agent in these soils. On the other hand, in soils with oxides and 1:1 type of phyllosiliacte clay minerals (e.g., kaolinite), soil organic matter is not the only binding agent and aggregate formation is also due to electrostatic charges between and among oxides and kaolinite particles. Therefore, in these soils, aggregation is less pronounced.

==== Soil Organic Matter ====
Soil organic matter can increase aggregate stability in soil and form a soil carbon sponge. Soil organic matter can be classified based on how it is incorporated in soil aggregates:

- transient (polysaccharides fraction of soil organic matter),
- temporary (fungal hyphae and plant roots), and
- persistent (resistant aromatic compounds that are associated with polyvalent metal cations and strongly adsorbed polymers).

Temporary organic matter stabilizes macroaggregates (> 250 μm), while transient and persistent organic matter stabilizes microaggregates. Soil organic matter’s role in aggregate stability can be difficult to determine, due to several reasons:

- only part of the total soil organic matter plays a role in aggregate stability,
- there is a threshold of soil organic matter, above which aggregate stability cannot be improved by addition of organic matter, and
- organic matter is not the primary binding agent in that particular soil.

=== Physical Processes ===
==== Wetting and Drying ====
Soil wetting and drying cycles can have both a beneficial effect on soil aggregation, and a negative effect on soil aggregation. To help explain these contradictory results, it was hypothesized that soils will maintain a state of aggregate stability equilibrium. If soils have certain properties, a threshold level will be reached where a period of wetting and drying will lead to increases or decreases in aggregate stability depending on the aggregate stability of the soil at that point in time.

==== Shrinking and Swelling ====
Shrinking and swelling cycles of soil are closely linked with wetting and drying cycles; however, they are also dependent on the type of clay phyllosilicate minerals present. Soils with higher content of 2:1 types of phyllosilicate minerals (such as montmorillonite), have a stronger cementation force acting during repeated wetting and drying cycles, which can increase soil aggregate stability. This is because 2:1 type phyllosilicate minerals swell and increase their volume with changing water content; meaning these soils expand when wet, and contract as they dry out.

Through repeated shrinking and swelling action, soil aggregation occurs because of the rearrangement of soil particles due to the stress of increasing soil-water suction (Kay, 1990). Some soils even have the ability to “self-mulch”, meaning a desirable granular structure is formed at the surface of the soil due to the shrinking and swelling nature of the soil particles.

==== Freezing and Thawing ====
When soils freeze and thaw, they undergo expansion and contraction. It was found that with higher water content in the soil at the time of freezing had a reducing effect on aggregate stability overall. The water expands in these soils and breaks apart the aggregates into smaller aggregates, while pores created by the freezing collapse once soils thaw.

=== Soil Biological Factors ===
Soil biological processes are most important in soils that do not have 2:1 phyllosilicate clay minerals, and are therefore lacking in shrinking and swelling properties that can aid in structural formation. Soil organisms can have an indirect and direct effects on soil structure at different levels of aggregate formation. Macrooaggregates (>2000 μm) are held together by plant roots and fungal hyphae, mesoaggregates (20-250 μm) are held together by a combination of cementing agents including: sesquioxides and persistent organic matter, and microaggregates (2-20 μm) are held together by persistent organic bonds. Soil fauna mix soil particles with organic matter to create close associations with one another contributing to a soil carbon sponge.

==== Soil Fauna ====
Earthworms, termites, and ants are some of the most important invertebrates that are capable of having an effect on soil structure. When earthworms ingest soil mineral and organic components, they can increase the structural stability of that soil through increased carbon-mineral associations and formation of casts, which increase aggregate stability. Some earthworms are able to create stable microaggregates by flocculation of Ca^{2+} ions during digestion. Some microarthropods, including mites and collembola, although they are small, because there are large numbers of them, they are able to improve soil structure. These organisms are often associated with forest ecosystems. They ingest a mixture of humic materials and plant debris. Their production of fecal pellets can improve soil structure.

==== Fungi and Plant Roots ====
Roots and fungal hyphae are important factors in aggregate formation. They are considered a temporary aggregate binding agent, and are typically associated with early stages of aggregate formation. Roots can act as a binding agent themselves, and produce large amounts of exudates that supply carbon to the rhizosphere organisms and soil fauna. Also, since roots uptake water, they can have a drying effect on the soil in their vicinity. Fungal hyphae can serve as binding agent that stabilizes macroaggregates and they also secrete polysaccharides that contribute to microaggregation.

=== Other Factors Affecting Aggregate Stability ===
==== Agricultural Management ====
How farmers manage their land can have profound changes in aggregate stability, which can either increase or decrease aggregate stability. The main disruptors of aggregate stability are: tillage, traffic from equipment, and traffic from livestock. Tillage can disrupt soil aggregation in several ways: (i) it brings subsoil to the surface, thereby exposing it to precipitation and freeze-thaw cycles, and (ii) it changes soil moisture, temperature, and oxygen level, thereby increasing decomposition and carbon loss. Using reduced tillage or zero tillage practices have been shown to improve soil aggregation compared to conventional tillage methods. The use of cover crops has been shown to increase soil aggregation, due to the increase of soil organic matter and soil cover that they provide. Perennial crops typically require a halt in tillage, which prevents aggregate disruption, and allows plant to develop an extensive root system which can promote aggregate stability. Additionally, inputs of organic matter in the form of mulch or manure application can increase aggregation by adding carbon to the soil matrix and increasing rates of biological activity in the soil. Higher stocking rate of livestock such as cattle can decrease the aggregate stability of soil due to compaction of soil and loss of vegetation.

==== Soil Conditioners ====
Soil conditioners are amendments that can be applied to the soil to improve properties such as structure and water retention to improve soils for their intended use, but not specifically for soil fertility, although many soil amendments can alter the soil fertility. Some typical amendments include: lime, gypsum, sulfur, compost, wood wastes, peat, manure, biosolids, and biological amendments. In order to be effective, soil conditioners must be spread evenly across the field, be applied at the correct time to prevent nutrient loss, and have the correct nutrient content. Additionally, application of soil conditioners is site specific, and should be approached on a case by case basis, as a soil conditioner may not work on all soils equally.

==== Climate ====
Variations in climate and seasons can have an effect on aggregate stability of the soil. In a Mediterranean climate, it was found that aggregate stability varied on a nearly cyclical pattern, with lower aggregate stability in the winter and early spring compared to higher aggregate stability in the summer months. This variation in aggregate stability was found to be highly correlated with total monthly rainfall and average monthly rainfall. Aggregate stability can be impacted by the amount and intensity of precipitation. Higher amounts of precipitation and irregular rainfall events can decrease aggregate stability and increase erosion. Also, higher temperatures can increase the rates of decomposition in soil, which reduces the amount of carbon on the site, which can reduce aggregate stability. Many of the influences that climate has on soil aggregate stability are due to interactions of soil type with wetting/drying, shrinking/swelling, and freezing/thawing.

== Aggregate Stability Measurement ==
Soil aggregate stability can be measured in several ways, since:

- Soils aggregates can be destabilized by various external pressures brought about by wind, water, or machinery.
- Soil aggregate stability can be determined at different size scales.

In most cases, the wet aggregate stability method is more relevant, because this method mimics the effects of water erosion, which is the driving force of erosion in most environments. However, in an arid environment, dry aggregate stability may be the more applicable method because it mimics wind erosion which is the driving force of erosion in these environments. describes a method where aggregates are submersed in water, and the soil that is slaked off the aggregate is measured. used a method whereby aggregates were subjected to different internal swelling pressures from different concentrations of sodium chloride (NaCl). Some common methodologies are described below.

=== Wet Aggregate Stability Method ===
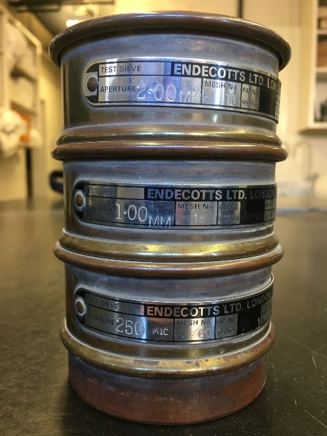
Soil sieve nests

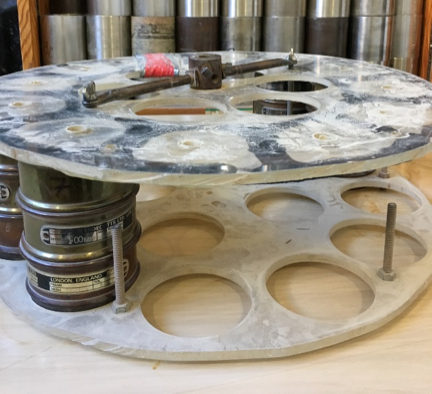
Soil sieve nest holder

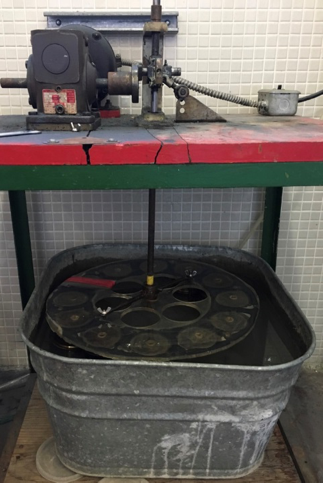
Wet sieving apparatus with soil sieve nest holder and nests in place

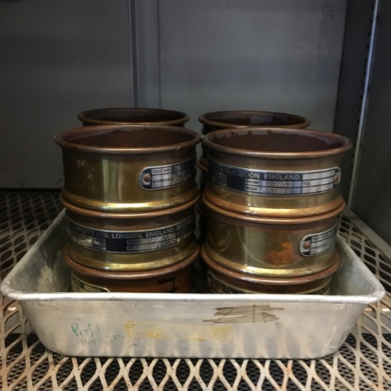
Soil sieve nests placed in the oven

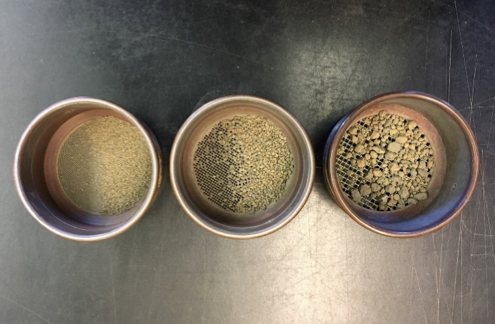
Soil sieve nests after removal from the oven with dry soil aggregates

A wet sieving apparatus described Yoder can be used to determine wet aggregate stability in the following procedure by Black, Kember and Chepil, which was adapted by Dane, Topp, Nimmo and Perkins.

1. Sieve soil to obtain soil samples with aggregates between 2–4 mm size aggregates.
2. Weigh out 15 g of these 2–4 mm sized aggregates.
3. Place onto top of sieve nests with sieve size openings of 4.76 mm, 2.00 mm, 1.00 mm, and 0.21 mm.
4. Slowly wet the soils using a spray bottle and humidifier until aggregates become saturated and are glistening.
5. Place sieve nests into the wet sieving apparatus with 30 rotations/minute for approximately 10 minutes.
6. Remove the sieve nests and place in the oven at 105 °C for 24 hours.
7. Place approximately 7 g of wet soil into a weighed tin, then place in the oven at 105 °C for 24.
8. Weigh the dried soil each of the sieve nests
9. Samples can then be placed in a hexametaphosphate solution, to disperse the particles, then washed through the sieve again to remove sand particles. These sand particles can then be oven dried at 105 °C for 24 hours, weighted, and accounted for in the calculation for aggregate stability.

To calculate the mean weight, the following formulae can be used:

S_{4.76} = Ws_{4.76} / (Ws/1+Ø)
S_{2} = Ws_{2} / (Ws/1+Ø)
S_{1} = Ws_{1} / (Ws/1+Ø)
S_{0.21} = Ws_{0.21} / (Ws/1+Ø)
S_{<0.21} = 1 – (S_{4.76}+ S_{2}+ S_{1}+ S_{0.21})
Ø = (Ws_{wet} – Ws_{dry}) / Ws_{dry}
MWD (mm) = (S_{4.76}*4.76)+(S_{2}*2)+(S_{1}*1)+(S_{0.21}*0.21)+(S_{<0.21}*0.105)

For formulas:

Ws_{4.76} = 4.76 mm sieve
Ws_{2} = 2 mm sieve
Ws_{1} = 1 mm sieve
Ws_{0.21} = 0.21 mm sieve
Ws_{wet} = weight of soil wet
Ws_{dry} = weight of soil dry
Ø = water content
MWD (mm) = mean weight diameter

=== Dry Aggregate Stability Method ===
A dry sieving rotary cylinder described by Chepil can be used in combination with a nested sieve design, as described by the following procedure by Metting and Rayburn:

1. Sieve soil samples to obtain aggregates from 0.92–1.68 mm in diameter.
2. Weigh out 2 kg of soil sample aggregates.
3. Arrange soil sieve nests with openings of >0.84, 0.84–0.42, and <0.42 mm.
4. Aggregates were then fed onto the sieve nests using a conveyor belt at a speed of 10 mm/s.
5. The rotary cylinder is then operated at 10 rotations per minute until the complete sample has been separated into aggregate fractions >0.84, 0.84–0.42, and <0.42 mm.
6. Dry stability is then measured as a percentage of aggregates that are >0.42 mm following rotary cylinder method.

=== Slaking Method ===
The slaking method used to measure soil aggregate stability is a measure of how well a soil aggregate sticks together when submersed in water. Several methods exist utilizing this method, one of which is the "Moulder: Soil Aggregates" application developed by Fajardo and McBratney. This method utilizes a smartphone and outlines how farmers and scientists are able to measure aggregate stability using samples from their field using the following method:

1. Take a sample of soil from the field (at 0–7.5 cm) using a spade.
2. Store the sample in the fridge until ready to analyze.
3. Select samples using a ruler to obtain aggregates from 1–2 cm in diameter and place on a shallow dish with a plain white background that you can add water to.
4. Set up your phone with a camera on the back so that it has a clear view of the soil aggregates.
5. Add water to the dish to cover the aggregates and start the app.
6. After several minutes, the aggregate will disperse to a varying degree.
7. The app will then give you a score which can be used to determine how stable your aggregate and therefore soil is.
