= Soil structure =

Arrangement of a soil's particles and pore spaces

In geotechnical engineering, soil structure describes the arrangement of the solid parts of the soil and of the pore space located between them. It is determined by how individual soil granules clump, bind together, and aggregate, resulting in the arrangement of soil pores between them. Soil has a major influence on water and air movement, biological activity, root growth and seedling emergence. There are several different types of soil structure. It is inherently a dynamic and complex system that is affected by different biotic and abiotic factors.

== Overview ==
Soil structure describes the arrangement of the solid parts of the soil and of the pore spaces located between them. Aggregation is the result of the interaction of soil particles through rearrangement, flocculation and cementation. It is enhanced by: the precipitation of oxides, hydroxides, carbonates and silicates; the products of biological activity (such as biofilms, fungal hyphae and glycoproteins); ionic bridging between negatively charged particles (both clay minerals and organic compounds) by multivalent cations; and interactions between organic compounds (hydrogen bonding and hydrophobic bonding).

The quality of soil structure will decline under most forms of cultivation; the associated mechanical mixing of the soil compacts and shears aggregates and fills pore spaces; it also exposes organic matter to a greater rate of decay and oxidation. A further consequence of continued cultivation and traffic is the development of compacted, impermeable layers or hardpans within the soil profile.

The decline of soil structure under irrigation is usually related to the breakdown of aggregates and dispersion of clay material as a result of rapid wetting. This is particularly so if soils are sodic; that is, having a high exchangeable sodium percentage (ESP) of the cations attached to the clays. High sodium levels (compared to high calcium levels) cause particles to repel one another when wet, and the associated aggregates to disaggregate and disperse. The ESP will increase if irrigation causes salty water (even of low concentration) to gain access to the soil.

A wide range of practices are undertaken to preserve and improve soil structure. For example, the New South Wales Department of Land and Water Conservation advocates: increasing organic content by incorporating pasture phases into cropping rotations; reducing or eliminating tillage in cropping and pasture activities; avoiding soil disturbance during periods of excessive dry or wet when soils may accordingly tend to shatter or smear; and ensuring sufficient ground cover to protect the soil from raindrop impact and subsequent slaking. In irrigated agriculture, it may be recommended to: apply gypsum (calcium sulfate) to displace sodium cations with calcium and so reduce ESP or sodicity, avoid rapid wetting, and avoid disturbing soils when too wet or dry.

== Types ==
The main types of soil structures are:

- Platy – The units are flat and platelike. They are generally oriented horizontally.
- Prismatic – The individual units are bounded by flat to rounded vertical faces. Units are distinctly longer vertically, and the faces are typically casts or molds of adjoining units. Vertices are angular or subrounded; the tops of the prisms are somewhat indistinct and normally flat.
- Columnar – The units are similar to prisms and bounded by flat or slightly rounded vertical faces. The tops of columns, in contrast to those of prisms, are very distinct and normally rounded.
- Blocky – The units are blocklike or polyhedral. They are bounded by flat or slightly rounded surfaces that are casts of the faces of surrounding peds. Typically, blocky structural units are nearly equidimensional but grade to prisms and plates. The structure is described as angular blocky if the faces intersect at relatively sharp angles and as subangular blocky if the faces are a mixture of rounded and plane faces and the corners are mostly rounded.
- Granular – The units are approximately spherical or polyhedral. They are bounded by curved or very irregular faces that are not casts of adjoining peds.
- Wedge – The units are approximately elliptical with interlocking lenses that terminate in acute angles. They are commonly bounded by small slickensides.
- Lenticular —The units are overlapping lenses parallel to the soil surface. They are thickest in the middle and thin towards the edges. Lenticular structure is commonly associated with moist soils, texture classes high in silt or very fine sand (e.g., silt loam), and high potential for frost action.

=== Platy ===
In platy structure, the units are flat and platelike. They are generally oriented horizontally. A special form, lenticular platy structure, is recognized for plates that are thickest in the middle and thin toward the edges. Platy structure is usually found in subsurface soils that have been subject to compaction by animal trampling or machinery traffic, but platy structures may also result from wetting-drying and freeze-thaw cycles where they are of the lenticular type. The plates can be separated with a little effort by prying the horizontal layers with a pen knife. Platy structure tends to impede the downward movement of water and plant roots through the soil.

=== Prismatic ===
In the prismatic structure, the individual units are bounded by flat to rounded vertical faces. Units are distinctly longer vertically, and the faces are typically casts or molds of adjoining units. Vertices are angular or subrounded; the tops of the prisms are somewhat indistinct and normally flat. Prismatic structures are characteristic of clay- illuviated B horizons or subsoils. The vertical cracks result from freeze-thaw and wetting-drying cycles. They allow the downward movement of water and roots.

=== Columnar ===
In the columnar structure, the units are similar to prisms and are bounded by flat or slightly rounded vertical faces. The tops of columns, in contrast to those of prisms, are very distinct and normally rounded. Columnar structure is common in the subsoil of sodium affected soils and soils rich in swelling clays such as the smectites and the kandite Halloysite. Columnar structure is very dense and it is very difficult for plant roots to penetrate these layers. Techniques such as deep plowing have helped to restore some degree of fertility to these soils.

=== Blocky ===
In blocky structure, the structural units are blocklike or polyhedral. They are bounded by flat or slightly rounded surfaces that are casts of the faces of surrounding peds. Typically, blocky structural units are nearly equidimensional but grade to prisms and to plates. The structure is described as angular blocky if the faces intersect at relatively sharp angles; as subangular blocky if the faces are a mixture of rounded and plane faces and the corners are mostly rounded. Blocky structures are common in subsoil but also occur in surface soils that have a high clay content. The strongest blocky structure is formed as a result of swelling and shrinking of the clay minerals which produce cracks. Sometimes the surface of dried-up sloughs and ponds shows characteristic cracking and peeling due to clays.

=== Granular ===
In the granular structure, also called crumby or crumb structure, the structural units are approximately spherical or polyhedral and are bounded by curved or very irregular faces that are not casts of adjoining peds. In other words, they look like cookie crumbs. Granular structure is common in the surface soils of rich grasslands and highly amended garden soils with high organic matter content. Soil mineral particles are both separated and bridged by organic matter breakdown products, root and microbial exudates, and animal excreta, making the soil easy to work. Cultivation, earthworms, frost action and rodents mix the soil and decrease the size of the peds. This structure allows for good porosity and easy movement of air and water. This combination of ease in tillage, good moisture and air handling capabilities, and good structure for planting and germination, are definitive of the phrase good tilth, a prominent component of soil health.

== Improvement ==
The benefits of improving soil structure (i.e. tending to granular structure) for the growth of plants, particularly in an agricultural setting, include: reduced erosion due to greater soil aggregate strength and decreased overland flow; improved root penetration and access to soil moisture and nutrients; improved emergence of seedlings due to reduced crusting of the surface; and greater water infiltration, retention and water availability due to improved porosity.

Productivity from irrigated no-tillage or minimum tillage soil management in horticulture usually decreases over time due to degradation of the soil structure, inhibiting root growth and water retention. There are a few exceptions, why such exceptional fields retain structure is unknown, but it is associated with high organic matter. Improving soil structure in such settings can increase yields significantly. The New South Wales Department of Land and Water Conservation suggests that in cropping systems, wheat yields can be increased by 10 kg/ha for every extra millimetre of rain that is able to infiltrate due to soil structure.

Several techniques exist or have been suggested to improve soil structure, all of them tending to increase either porosity, organic matter content and/or soil microbial and faunal activity, i.e. all features associated with good granular/crumb structure. Incorporating or depositing organic matter (e.g. mulch, manure, compost) has been practiced since the beginning of sedentary agriculture, favouring aggregation through the formation of stable bridges between mineral particles. In tropical areas, the fast rate of organic matter mineralization under warm/moist climate prevents using manure, mulch or compost for improving soil structure. Organic matter was favourably replaced by charcoal, a source of black carbon, known for its longevity and stable links with clay minerals. Charcoal addition has been practiced by Amerindians during Pre-Columbian times in the so-called Terra preta areas, also known as Amazonian Dark Earths. Biochar is a present-day application of this ancestral technique. Liming, either practised alone or in association with organic matter, increases soil porosity and aggregation thanks to the bridging capacity of the divalent calcium cation towards negatively charged clay particles and organic molecules. Calcium also protects organic matter from mineralization, stabilizing it within aggregates. Several cultural techniques have been employed for a long time to stimulate aeration and soil biological activity in waterlogged soils, thereby shifting soil structure from compact types (e.g. lenticular) to granular along rows where crops were planted or sown. Although they differ according to countries and epochs, all of them allow the cultivated part of the soil profile to be at distance from the phreatic zone and thus better aerated: ridge-tillage, a form of conservation tillage, is an example. The penetration of burrowing earthworms in areas deprived of them (e.g. in recent polders) has been observed to improve soil structure. The introduction of European earthworms in earthworm-free areas improved soil structure and increased to a great extent the productivity of New Zealand pastures. The Earthworm Inoculation Unit (EIU) technique has been suggested as an efficient and cost-friendly method to become an integral component of sustainable land restoration practice.

== Hardsetting soil ==
Hardsetting soils lose their structure when wet and then set hard as they dry out to form a structureless mass that is very difficult to cultivate. They can only be tilled when their moisture content is within a limited range. When they are tilled the result is often a very cloddy surface (poor tilth). As they dry out the high soil strength often restricts seedling and root growth. Infiltration rates are low and runoff of rain and irrigation limits the productivity of many hardsetting soils.

=== Definition ===
Hardsetting has been defined this way: "A hardsetting horizon is one that sets to an almost homogeneous mass on drying. It may have occasional cracks, typically at a spacing of >0.1 m. Air dry hardset soil is hard and brittle, and it is not possible to push a forefinger into the profile face. Typically, it has a tensile strength of 90 kN^{–2}. Soils that crust are not necessarily hardsetting since a hardsetting horizon is thicker than a crust. (In cultivated soils the thickness of the hardsetting horizon is frequently equal to or greater than that of the cultivated layer.) Hardsetting soil is not permanently cemented and is soft when wet. The clods in a hardsetting horizon that has been cultivated will partially or totally disintegrate upon wetting. If the soil has been sufficiently wetted, it will revert to its hardset state on drying. This can happen after flood irrigation or a single intense rainfall event."

== Soil structure dynamics ==
Soil structure is inherently a dynamic and complex system that is affected by different factors such as tillage, wheel traffic, root, microbial and faunal activities in soil, rainfall events, wind erosion, wetting and drying, freezing and thawing. In turn, reciprocally soil structure interacts and affects the root growth and function, soil fauna and microorganisms, water and solute transport processes, gas exchange, thermal conductivity and electrical conductivity, traffic bearing capacity, and many other aspects in relation with soil. Ignoring soil structure or viewing it as "static" can lead to poor predictions of soil properties and might significantly affect the soil management.

== See also ==
- Soil health – State of soil, meeting ecosystem functions
- Soil resilience – Ability of a soil to resist or recover its healthy state after disturbance

== Sources ==
- Australian Journal of Soil Research, 38(1) 61 – 70. Cited in: Land and Water Australia 2007, ways to improve soil structure and improve the productivity of irrigated agriculture, viewed May 2007, <https://web.archive.org/web/20070930071224/http://npsi.gov.au/>
- Department of Land and Water Conservation 1991, "Field indicators of soil structure decline", viewed May 2007
- Leeper, GW & Uren, NC 1993, 5th edn, Soil science, an introduction, Melbourne University Press, Melbourne
- Marshall, TJ & Holmes JW, 1979, Soil Physics, Cambridge University Press
- Soil Survey Division Staff (1993). "Examination and Description of Soils". Handbook 18. Soil survey manual. Soil Conservation Service. U.S. Department of Agriculture. Archived from the original on 2011-05-14.
- Charman, PEV & Murphy, BW 1998, 5th edn, Soils, their properties and management, Oxford University Press, Melbourne
- Firuziaan, M. and Estorff, O., (2002), "Simulation of the Dynamic Behavior of Bedding-Foundation-Soil in the Time Domain", Springer Verlag.
