= Immobilization (soil science) =

Immobilization in soil science is the conversion of inorganic compounds to organic compounds by microorganisms or plants by which the compounds become inaccessible to plants. Immobilization is the opposite of mineralization. In immobilization, inorganic nutrients are taken up by soil microbes and become unavailable for plant uptake. Immobilization is therefore a biological process controlled by bacteria that consume inorganic nitrogen and form amino acids and biological macromolecules (organic forms). Immobilization and mineralization are continuous processes that occur concurrently whereby nitrogen of the decomposing system is steadily transformed from an inorganic to an organic state by immobilization and from an organic to an inorganic state by decay and mineralization.

== C:N Ratio ==
Whether nitrogen is mineralized or immobilized depends on the C/N ratio of the plant residues. For example, incorporating materials high in carbon to nitrogen ratio such as saw dust and straw will stimulate soil microbial activity, increase demand for nitrogen, leading to immobilization. This is known as priming effect. In general plant residues entering the soil have too little nitrogen for the soil microbial population to convert all of the carbon into their cells. If the C:N ratio of the decomposing plant material is above about 30:1 the soil microbial population may take nitrogen in mineral form (e.g. nitrate). This mineral nitrogen is said to be immobilized. Microorganisms out-compete plants for NH4+ and NO3- during immobilization, and therefore plants can easily become nitrogen deficient.

As carbon dioxide is released via decomposition the C:N ratio of the organic matter decreases, and the microbial demand for mineral nitrogen is decreased. When the C:N ratio falls below about 25:1 further decomposition results in simultaneous mineralization of nitrogen which is in excess to that required by the microbial population.

When decomposition is virtually complete soil mineral nitrogen will be higher than it was initially due to mineralization of the plant residue nitrogen.

=== Mechanisms of nitrogen immobilization ===
There are two mechanisms of nitrogen immobilization: Nitrogen accumulation in microbial biomass and accumulation of nitrogen in by-products of microbial activity. Nitrogen Accumulation in by-products of microbial activity nitrogen accumulation in decaying plant debris follows a two-phase mechanism. Following the initial leaching of soluble materials from fresh detritus, exoenzymes depolymerize the detritus substrate producing reactive carbohydrates, phenolics, small peptides, and amino acids, this is a period whereby microbial growth is rapid, with microbes converting substrate nitrogen and exogenous nitrogen into microbial biomass and exuded products of microbial activity.

== See also ==
- Mineralization (soil science)
- Nitrogen cycle
- Nitrification
