= Carbon-to-nitrogen ratio =

Chemical ratio in organic materials

A carbon-to-nitrogen ratio (C/N ratio or C:N ratio) is a ratio of the mass of carbon to that of nitrogen in organic residues. It can, amongst other things, be used in analysing sediments and soil including soil organic matter and soil amendments such as compost.

== Sediments ==
In the analysis of sediments, C/N ratios are a proxy for paleoclimate research, having different uses whether the sediment cores are terrestrial-based or marine-based. Carbon-to-nitrogen ratios indicate the degree of nitrogen limitation of plants and other organisms. They can identify whether molecules found in the sediment under study come from land-based or algal plants. Further, they can distinguish between different land-based plants, depending on the type of photosynthesis they undergo. Therefore, the C/N ratio serves as a tool for understanding the sources of sedimentary organic matter, which can lead to information about the ecology, climate, and ocean circulation at different times in Earth's history.

=== Ranges ===
C/N ratios in the range of 4-10:1 usually come from marine sources, whereas higher ratios are likely to come from a terrestrial source. Vascular plants from terrestrial sources tend to have C/N ratios greater than 20. The lack of cellulose, which has a chemical formula of (C_{6}H_{10}O_{5})_{n}, and greater amount of proteins in algae versus vascular plants causes this significant difference in the C/N ratio.

=== Instruments ===
Examples of devices that can be used to measure this ratio are the CHN analyzer and the continuous-flow isotope ratio mass spectrometer (CF-IRMS). However, for more practical applications, desired C/N ratios can be achieved by blending commonly used substrates of known C/N content, which are readily available and easy to use.

=== By sediment type ===
==== Marine ====
Organic matter that is deposited in marine sediments contains a key indicator as to its source and the processes it underwent before reaching the floor as well as after deposition, its carbon to nitrogen ratio. In the global oceans, freshly produced algae in the surface ocean typically have a carbon-to-nitrogen ratio of about 4 to 10. However, it has been observed that only 10% of this organic matter (algae) produced in the surface ocean sinks to the deep ocean without being degraded by bacteria in transit, and only about 1% is permanently buried in the sediment. An important process called sediment diagenesis accounts for the other 9% of organic carbon that sank to the deep ocean floor, but was not permanently buried, that is 9% of the total organic carbon produced is degraded in the deep ocean. The microbial communities utilizing the sinking organic carbon as an energy source, are partial to nitrogen-rich compounds because much of these bacteria are nitrogen-limited and much prefer it over carbon. As a result, the carbon-to-nitrogen ratio of sinking organic carbon in the deep ocean is elevated compared to fresh surface ocean organic matter that has not been degraded. An exponential increase in C/N ratios is observed with increasing water depth—with C/N ratios reaching ten at intermediate water depths of about 1000 meters and up to 15 in the deep ocean (deeper than about 2500 meters). This elevated C/N signature is preserved in the sediment until another form of diagenesis, post-depositional diagenesis, alters its C/N signature once again. Post-depositional diagenesis occurs in organic-carbon-poor marine sediments where bacteria can oxidize organic matter in aerobic conditions as an energy source. The oxidation reaction proceeds as follows: CH_{2}O + H_{2}O → CO_{2} + 4H^{+} + 4e^{−}, with standard free energy of –27.4 kJ mol^{−1} (half-reaction). Once all of the oxygen is used up, bacteria can carry out an anoxic sequence of chemical reactions as an energy source, all with negative ∆G°r values, with the reaction becoming less favorable as the chain of reactions proceeds.

The same principle described above explains the preferential degradation of nitrogen-rich organic matter within the sediments, as they are more labile and in higher demand. This principle has been utilized in paleoceanographic studies to identify core sites that have not experienced much microbial activity or contamination by terrestrial sources with much higher C/N ratios.

Lastly, ammonia, the product of the second reduction reaction, which reduces nitrate and produces nitrogen gas and ammonia, is readily adsorbed on clay mineral surfaces and protected from bacteria. This has been proposed to explain lower-than-expected C/N signatures of organic carbon in sediments undergoing post-depositional diagenesis.

Ammonium produced from the remineralisation of organic material, exists in elevated concentrations (1 - >14μM) within cohesive shelf sea sediments found in the Celtic Sea (depth: 1–30 cm). The sediment depth exceeds 1m and would be a suitable study site for conducting paleolimnology experiments with C:N.

==== Lacustrine ====
Unlike in marine sediments, diagenesis does not pose a large threat to the integrity of the C/N ratio in lacustrine sediments. Though wood from living trees around lakes have consistently higher C/N ratios than wood buried in sediment, the change in elemental composition is not large enough to remove the vascular versus non-vascular plant signals due to the refractory nature of terrestrial organic matter. Abrupt shifts in the C/N ratio down-core can be interpreted as shifts in the organic source material.

For example, two studies on Mangrove Lake, Bermuda, and Lake Yunoko, Japan, show irregular, abrupt fluctuations between C/N around 11 to 18. These fluctuations are attributed to shifts from mainly algal dominance to land-based vascular dominance. Results of studies that show abrupt shifts in algal dominance and vascular dominance often lead to conclusions about the state of the lake during these distinct periods of isotopic signatures. Times in which algal signals dominate lakes suggest a deep-water lake, while times in which vascular plant signals dominate lakes suggest the lake is shallow, dry, or marshy. Using the C/N ratio in conjunction with other sediment observations, such as physical variations, D/H isotopic analyses of fatty acids and alkanes, and δ13C analyses on similar biomarkers can lead to further regional climate interpretations that describe the more significant phenomena at play.

== Soil ==
In microbial communities like soil, the C:N ratio is a key indicator as it describes a balance between energetic foods (represented by carbon) and material to build protein with (represented by nitrogen). An optimal C:N ratio of around 24:1 provides for higher microbial activity.

The C:N ratio of soil can be modified by the addition of materials such as compost, manure, and mulch. A feedstock with a near-optimal C:N ratio will be consumed quickly. Any excess C will cause the N originally in the soil to be consumed, competing with the plant for nutrients (immobilization) – at least temporarily until the microbes die. Any excess N, on the other hand, will usually just be left behind (mineralization), but too much excess may result in leaching losses. The recommended C:N ratio for soil materials is, therefore, 30:1. A soil test may be done to find the C:N ratio of the soil itself.

The C:N ratio of microbes themselves is generally around 10:1. A lower ratio is correlated with higher soil productivity.

=== Compost ===
The role of C:N ratio in compost feedstock is similar to that of soil feedstock. The recommendation is around 20-30:1. The microbes prefer a ratio of 30-35:1, but the carbon is usually not completely digested (especially in the case of lignin feedstock), hence the lowered ratio.

An imbalance of C:N ratio causes a slowdown in the composting process and a drop in temperature. When the C:N ratio is less than 15:1, outgassing of ammonium may occur, creating odor and losing nitrogen. A finished compost has a C:N ratio of around 10:1.

=== Estimating C and N contents of feedstocks ===
The C and N contents of feedstocks is generally known from lookup tables listing common types of feedstock. It is important to deduct the moisture content if the listed value is for dry material.

For foodstuffs with a nutrition analysis, the N content may be estimated from the protein content as prot% × 0.16, reversing the crude protein calculation. The C content may be estimated from crude ash content (often reported in animal feed) or from reported macronutrient levels as carbs% × 0.44 + fat% × 0.86 + prot% × 0.53.

Given the C:N ratio and one of C and N contents, the other content may be calculated using the very definition of the ratio. When only the ratio is known, one must estimate the total C+N% or one of the contents to get both values.

=== Managing mixed feedstocks ===
The C:N ratio of mixed feedstocks is calculated by summing their C and N amounts together and dividing the two results. For compost, moisture is also an important factor.
