= Priming (microbiology) =

Priming or a "priming effect" is said to occur when something that is added to soil or compost affects the rate of decomposition occurring on the soil organic matter (SOM), either positively or negatively. Organic matter is made up mostly of carbon and nitrogen, so adding a substrate containing certain ratios of these nutrients to soil may affect the microbes that are mineralizing SOM. Fertilizers, plant litter, detritus, and carbohydrate exudates from living roots, can potentially positively or negatively prime SOM decomposition.

== See also ==
- Soil carbon
- Nutrient cycle
- Soil chemistry
- Soil biology
- Environmental microbiology
- Microbial biodegradation
