= Dispersion (geology) =

Dispersion is a process that occurs in soils that are particularly vulnerable to erosion by water. In soil layers where clays are saturated with sodium ions ("sodic soils"), soil can break down very easily into fine particles and wash away. This can lead to a variety of soil and water quality problems, including:

- large soil losses by gully erosion and tunnel erosion
- Soil structural degradation, clogging and sealing where dispersed particles settle
- Suspended soil causing turbidity in water and transporting nutrients off the land.

== Identifying dispersive soils ==
Dispersive soils are more common in older landscapes where leaching and illuviation processes have had more time to work. A source of sodium is also required. Possible sources can include weathering from soil parent materials or wind-blown salt deposition. Sodium ions are highly mobile in the soil solution and so they accumulate in the lower parts of the landscape.

The dispersive portion of a soil profile is generally confined to the subsoil, where soil-forming processes concentrate clay minerals and sodium. This means that dispersive soils may not be identified until they are disturbed in a way that exposes the subsoil to running water.

When observed in situ, dispersive soil textures may feel 'soapy', and in many cases the physical structure of subsoil layers will be prismatic or columnar. A simplified version of the Emerson soil dispersion test can be completed in the field on a 20-minute to two-hour timescale.

Laboratory tests used to diagnose a soil as dispersive focus on the cation exchange capacity of a soil sample and its cation breakdown. Soil cations are dominated by Ca^{2+}, Mg^{2+}, K^{+}, and Na^{+}, as well as H^{+} in acidic soils. The exchangeable sodium percentage ( "ESP", (sodium / (total cations)) * 100 ) is a key indicator derived from these measurements. Where ESP exceeds 5%, dispersive behaviour becomes possible, and is highly likely where ESP exceeds 15%.

== Managing dispersive soils ==
The best management approach to these soils is simply to avoid their disturbance. Maintaining vegetation cover of the soil is also important to minimize soil dispersion. In agricultural systems, this may mean making an effort to prevent surface soil loss and/or damage, as the surface soil and ground cover form a protective barrier. Landscape-scale management of excess salt is also important, as secondary salinisation can induce dispersive behaviour in soil.

In places where disturbance has occurred, amelioration with gypsum can be helpful. Other options include:

- Re-covering disturbed subsoil and re-vegetating the land
- Diverting concentrated surface water flows away from the eroded area.

== See also ==
- Sodication
