= Slaking (geology) =

Weathering

Slaking is the process in which earth materials disintegrate and crumble when exposed to moisture. The term can be applied to natural geologic formations, land modified by or for human use, or to the use of earth materials in manufacturing or industry.

This process can often lead to erosion if the geologic area is not flat or vegetated. The slaking property does not necessarily have to be in the A horizon, with B horizon slaking only becoming a problem when the A horizon is disturbed or eroded away.

Slaking occurs on soil aggregates and is correlated with the rate of wetting, where the faster the wetting, the more slaking occurs.

== Preventing slaking ==
As with most erosion, slaking can be prevented with re-vegetation of bare soil and limiting soil disturbance on slopes.
