= Mineralization (soil science) =

Decomposition of organic matter

In soil science, mineralization is the decomposition (i.e., oxidation) of the chemical compounds in organic matter, by which the nutrients in those compounds are released in soluble inorganic forms that may be available to plants. Mineralization is the opposite of immobilization.

Mineralization increases the bioavailability of the nutrients that were in the decomposing organic compounds, most notably (because of their quantities) nitrogen, phosphorus, and sulfur. Whether the decomposition of an organic compound will result in mineralization or immobilization is dependent on its concentration proportionate to that of the carbon in the organic matter. As a rule of thumb, if the concentration of a specific element exceeds the needs of the decomposer for biosynthesis or storage, then it will mineralize.

== Ratio of carbon to nitrogen ==
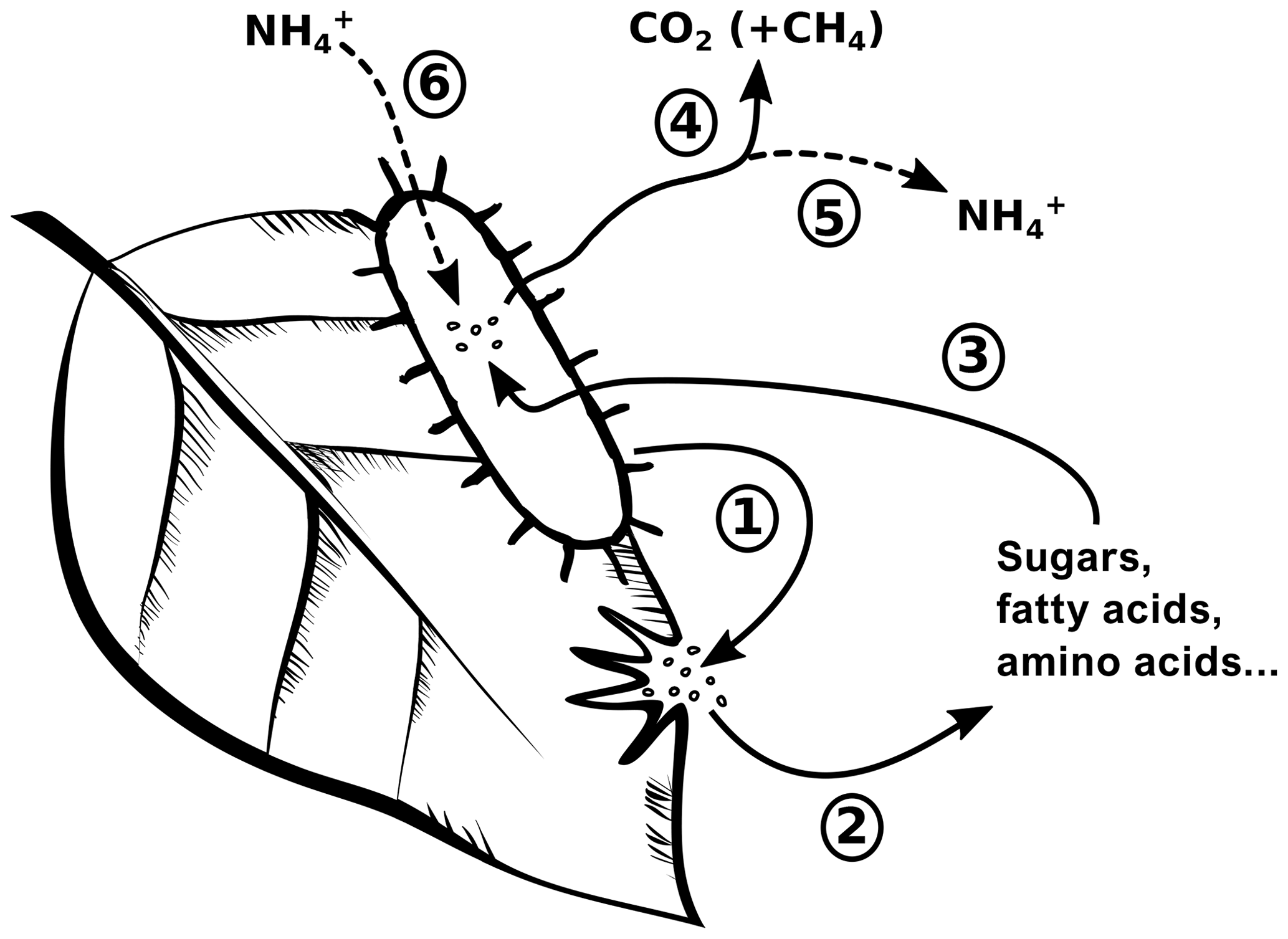
A conceptual view of C cycling and N cycling during organic matter decomposition. The soil microbial population releases exoenzymes (1), which depolymerize the dead organic matter (2). The microbial decomposers assimilate the monomers (3) and either mineralize these into inorganic compounds like carbon dioxide or ammonium (4) or use the monomers for their biosynthetic needs. N mineralization leads to a loss of ammonium to the environment (5), but this process is only relevant if the organic matter has a low C:N ratio. Ammonium from the environment can be immobilized if the dead organic matter has a high C:N ratio and thus provides insufficient N (6). The high microbial N demand leads to a retention of N within the organic matter and thus to a decrease of the C:N ratio over the course of decomposition.

Whether nitrogen mineralizes or immobilizes depends on the carbon-to-nitrogen ratio (C:N ratio) of the decomposing organic matter. In general, organic matter contacting soil has too little nitrogen to support the biosynthetic needs of the decomposing soil microbial population. If the C:N ratio of the decomposing organic matter is above circa 30:1 then the decomposing microbes may absorb nitrogen in mineral form as, e. g., ammonium or nitrates. This mineral nitrogen is said to be immobilized. This may reduce the concentration of inorganic nitrogen in the soil and thus the nitrogen is not available to plants.

As carbon dioxide is released during the generation of energy in decomposition, a process called "catabolism", the C:N ratio of the organic matter decreases. When the C:N ratio is less than circa 25:1, further decomposition causes mineralization by the simultaneous release of inorganic nitrogen as ammonium. When the decomposition of organic matter is complete, the mineralized nitrogen therefrom adds to that already present in the soil and therefore increases the total mineral nitrogen in the soil.

== See also ==
- Carbon cycle
- Humus
- Mineral matter in plants
- Nitrification
- Nitrogen cycle
- Petrifaction/petrification
- Remineralisation
- Soil chemistry
