= Hydrous oxide =

Inorganic compound

Hydrous oxides are inorganic compounds of a metal, hydroxide, and weakly bound water. Some examples include:

- Hydrous ferric oxide (HFO)
- Hydrous cupric oxide
- Hydrous thorium oxide (THO) and hydrous titanium oxide (TiHO)
- Hydrous aluminum oxide (HAO)

Some of them, such as HFO and HAO, are precipitated in highly porous poorly crystalline or amorphous forms and therefore are good adsorbents used for example in water treatment.

Some others are gels.

Hydrous oxide films may be used an various applications such as electrocatalysis, supercapacitors, and sensors.

HFO and HAO may also result from oxidative weathering of rocks to produce iron an aluminum hydrous oxide clay soils.

== See also ==
- Hydrate
- Ferrihydrite
