= Soil management =

Application of methods to protect soil and enhance its performance

Soil management is the application of operations, practices, and treatments to protect soil and enhance its performance (such as soil fertility or soil mechanics). It includes soil conservation, soil amendment, and optimal soil health. In agriculture, some amount of soil management is needed both in nonorganic and organic types to prevent agricultural land from becoming less productive over decades. Organic farming in particular emphasizes optimal soil management, because it uses soil health as the exclusive or nearly exclusive source of its fertilization and pest control.

Soil management is an important tool for addressing climate change by increasing soil carbon and as well as addressing other major environmental issues associated with modern industrial agriculture practices. Project Drawdown highlights three major soil management practices as actionable steps for climate change mitigation: improved nutrient management, conservation agriculture (including no-till agriculture), and use of regenerative agriculture.

== Environmental impact ==
According to the EPA, agricultural soil management practices can lead to production and emission of nitrous oxide (N_{2}O), a major greenhouse gas and air pollutant. Activities that can contribute to N_{2}O emissions include fertilizer usage, irrigation and tillage. The management of soils accounts for over half of the emissions are from the Agriculture sector. Cattle livestock account for one third of the emissions, through methane emissions. Manure management and rice cultivation also produce emissions. Using biochar may decrease N_{2}O emissions from soils by an average of 54%. The usage of artificial fertilizer in the agricultural field leads to nutrition imbalance in the soil.

Soils can sequester carbon dioxide (CO_{2}) from the atmosphere, primarily by storing carbon as soil organic carbon (SOC) through the process of photosynthesis. CO_{2} can also be stored as inorganic carbon but this is less common. Converting natural land to agricultural land releases carbon back into the atmosphere. The amount of carbon a soil can sequester depends on the climate, current and historical land-use and management. Cropland has the potential to sequester 0.5–1.2 Pg C/year and grazing and pasture land could sequester 0.3–0.7 Pg C/year. Agricultural practices that sequester carbon can help mitigate climate change. Intensive farming deteriorates the functionality of soils.

Methods that significantly enhance carbon sequestration in soil include no-till farming, residue mulching, cover cropping, and crop rotation, all of which are more widely used in organic farming than in conventional farming. Because only 5% of US farmland currently uses no-till and residue mulching, there is a large potential for carbon sequestration. Similar practices such as arable land conversion to grasslands, crop residues and cover crops have been proposed in Europe.

== Practices ==
Conventional agriculture is driven by industrialization and aims to maximize efficiency. Practices include large-scale farming that specializes in monoculture and uses pesticides, herbicides, and fertilizers. Alternatives include conservation, regenerative, and organic agriculture, which can be broadly grouped as sustainable agriculture. Conservation agriculture has three main practices: minimizing soil disturbance, maintaining permanent soil coverage, and diversifying crop species. Similarly, regenerative agriculture practices use minimal to no tillage, cover crops, crop rotations, compost, and grazing. Organic agriculture incorporates most of these practices and emphasizes biological, not synthetic, management. There are three overarching practices that improve carbon sequestration in soils: increasing biomass inputs, decreasing SOC losses, and increasing the mean residence time (MRT) of SOC.

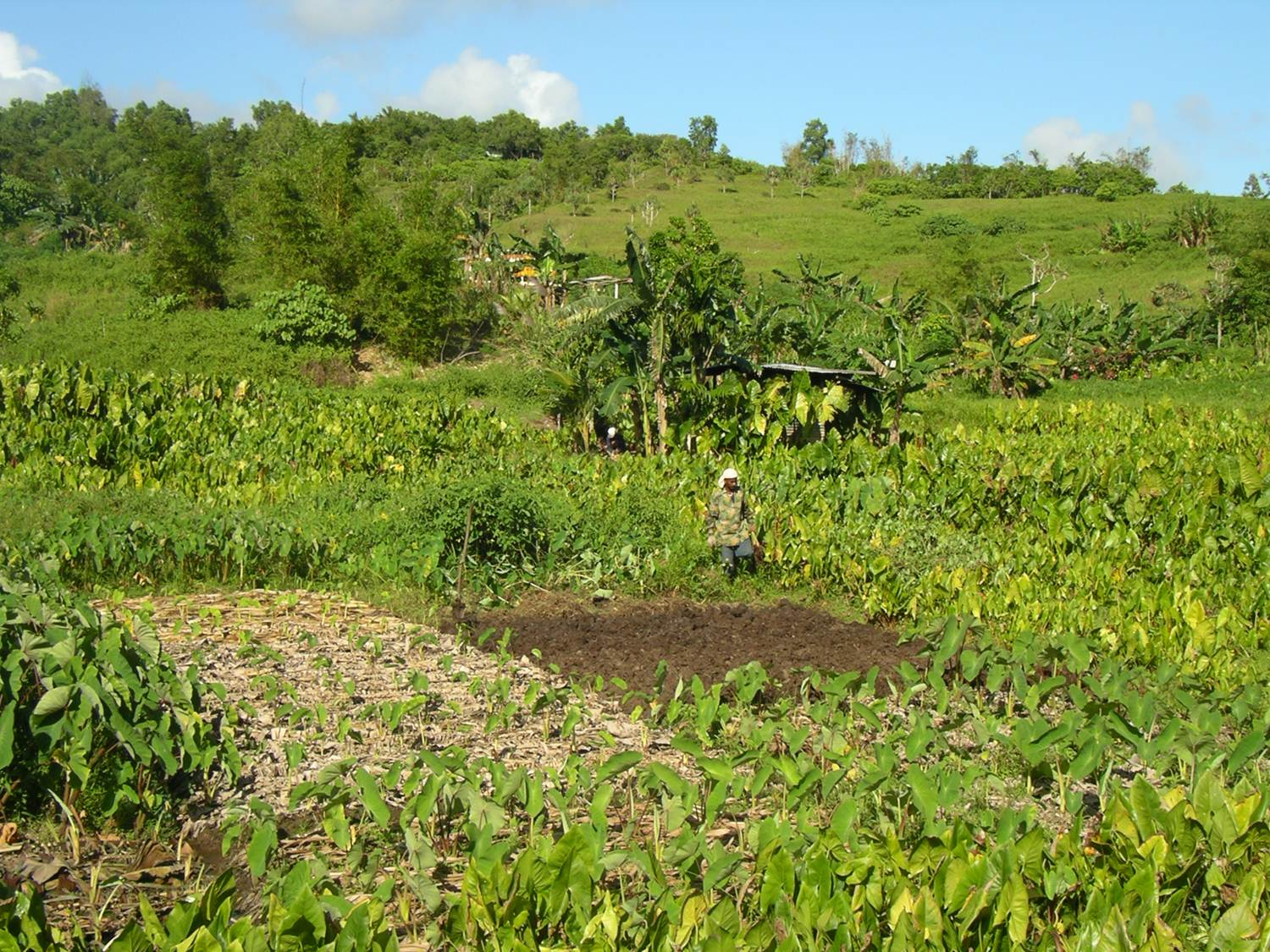
Cover cropping and mulching practiced as soil management in Palau

Specific soil management practices that affect soil health include:

- Controlling traffic on the soil surface helps to reduce soil compaction, which can reduce aeration and water infiltration.
- Planting cover crops that keep the soil anchored and covered in off-seasons so that the soil is not eroded by wind and rain.
- Crop rotations for row crops alternate high-residue crops with lower-residue crops to increase the amount of plant material left on the surface of the soil during the year to protect the soil from erosion.
- Nutrient management can help to improve the fertility of the soil and the amount of organic matter content, which improves soil structure and function.
- Tilling the soil, or tillage, is the breaking of soil, such as with a plough or harrow, to prepare the soil for new seeds. Tillage systems vary in intensity and disturbance. Conventional tillage is the most intense tillage system and disturbs the deepest level of soils. At least 30% of plant residue remains on the soil surface in conservation tillage. Reduced-tillage or no-till operations limit the amount of soil disturbance while cultivating a new crop, and help to maintain plant residues on the surface of the soil for erosion protection and water retention.
- Adding organic matter to the soil surface can increase carbon in the soil and the abundance and diversity of microbial organisms in the soil.
- Using fertilizers increases nutrients such as nitrogen, phosphorus, sulfur, and potassium in the soil. The use of fertilizers influences soil pH and often acidifies soils, with the exception of potassium fertilizer. Fertilizers can be organic or synthetic.
- Using a perennial grain crop such as Thinopyrum intermedium.
