= Digital agriculture =

Electronic agricultural data collection, storage, analysis, and sharing

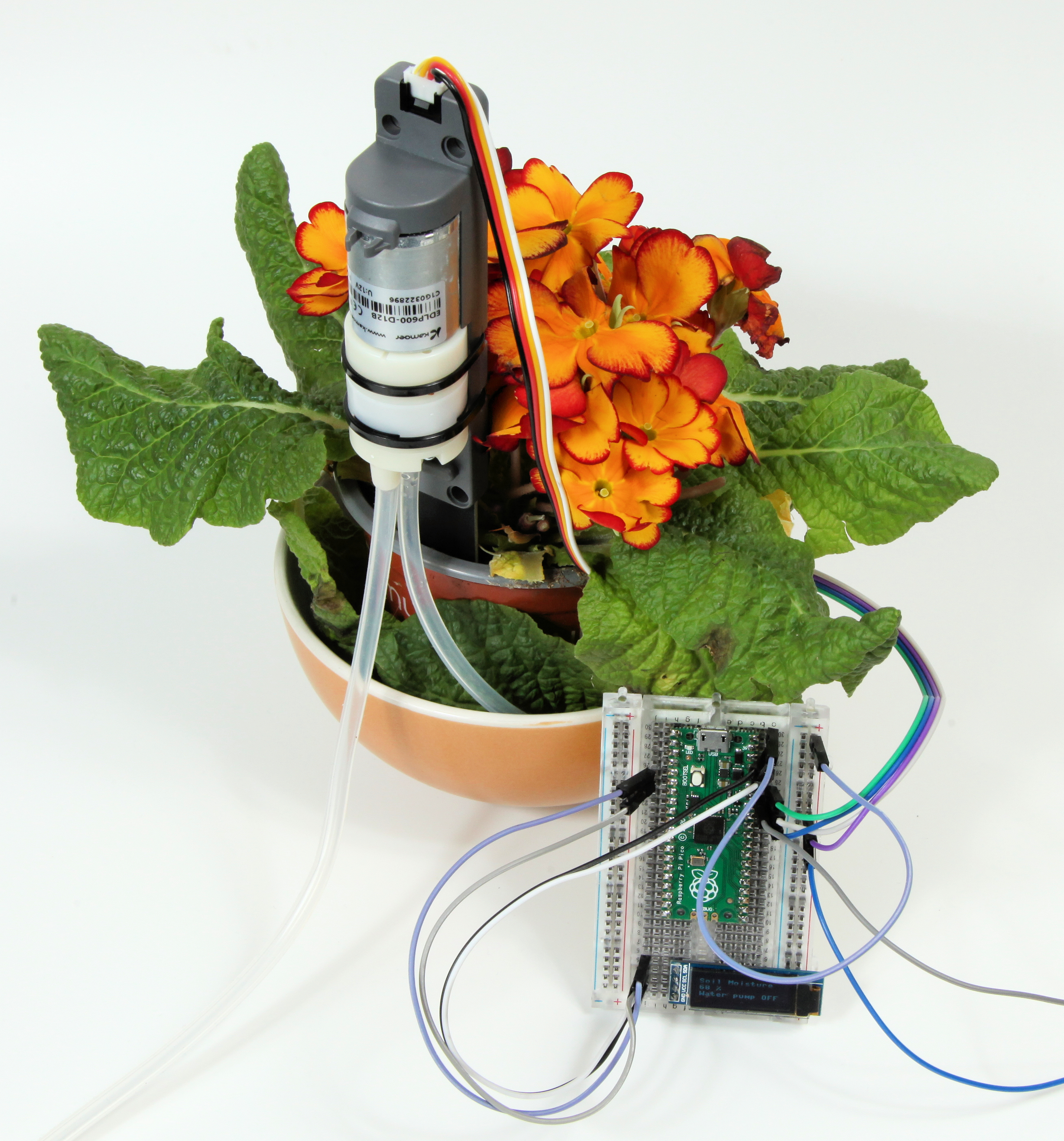
Plant being monitored and watered by a MCU-controlled circuit

Digital agriculture, sometimes known as smart farming or e-agriculture, consists of the application of digital technologies to monitor, analyze, and manage agricultural systems. It complements or partially replaces manual inspection, ad hoc assessment, and decision-making based on personal judgement with software-driven, analytics-based, semi- to fully automated monitoring, performance evaluation, operational planning and management. The Food and Agriculture Organization of the United Nations has described the digitalization process of agriculture as the digital agricultural revolution. Other definitions, such as those from the United Nations Project Breakthrough, Cornell University, and Purdue University, also emphasize the role of digital technology in the optimization of food systems.

Digital agriculture includes (but is not limited to) precision agriculture. Unlike precision agriculture, digital agriculture impacts the entire agri-food value chain before, during, and after on-farm production. Therefore, on-farm technologies like yield mapping, GPS navigation, and tracking, and variable-rate application, fall under the domain of precision agriculture and digital agriculture. On the other hand, digital technologies involved in e-commerce platforms, e-extension services, warehouse receipt systems, blockchain-enabled food traceability systems, tractor rental apps, etc. fall under the umbrella of digital agriculture but not precision agriculture.

== Historical context ==
Digital technologies are changing traditional agricultural practices. The Food and Agriculture Organization of the United Nations has referred to this change as a revolution: "a 'digital agricultural revolution' will be the newest shift that could help ensure agriculture meets the needs of the global population into the future." Other sources refer to this change as "Agriculture 4.0," indicating its role as the fourth major agricultural revolution. Precise dates of the Fourth Agricultural Revolution are unclear. The World Economic Forum announced that the "Fourth Industrial Revolution" (which includes agriculture) will unfold throughout the 21st century, so the beginning of Agriculture 4.0 is often placed around 2000 or shortly thereafter.

Agricultural revolutions denote periods of technological transformation and increased farm productivity. Agricultural revolutions include the First Agricultural Revolution, the Arab Agricultural Revolution, the British/Second Agricultural Revolution, the Scottish Agricultural Revolution, and the Green Revolution/Third Agricultural Revolution. Despite boosting agricultural productivity, past agricultural revolutions left many problems unsolved. For example, the Green Revolution had unintended consequences, like inequality and environmental damage. First, the Green Revolution exacerbated inter-farm and interregional inequality, typically biased toward large farmers with the capital to invest in new technologies. Second, critics say its policies promoted heavy input use and dependence on agrochemicals, which led to adverse environmental effects like soil degradation and chemical runoff. Digital agriculture technologies have the potential to address negative side effects of the Green Revolution.

In some ways, the Digital Agriculture Revolution follows patterns of previous agricultural revolutions. Scholars forecast a further shift away from labor, a slight shift away from capital, and intensified use of human capital, continuing the trend the British Agricultural Revolution started. Also, many predict that social backlash, possibly around the use of artificial intelligence or robots, will arise with the fourth revolution.

In other ways, the Digital Agriculture Revolution is distinct from its predecessors. First, digital technologies will affect all parts of the agricultural value chain, including off-farm segments. This differs from the first three agricultural revolutions, which primarily impacted production techniques and on-farm technologies. Second, a farmer's role will require more data analytics skills and less physical interaction with livestock/fields. Third, although farming has always relied on empirical evidence, the volume of data and the methods of analysis will undergo drastic changes in the digital revolution. For example, smart farm systems continuously monitor animal behavior, giving insight into their activities at all times. Finally, increased reliance on big data may increase the power differential between farmers and information service providers, or between farmers and large value chain actors (like supermarkets).

== Definitions ==
Definitions of digital agriculture vary across the scientific literature, but commonly emphasize three broad dimensions:

1. The use of digital technologies to collect high-resolution spatial and temporal data (including data acquired by proximal and remote sensors, e.g. via drones, and satellites);
2. The application of advanced data-processing methods and modelling frameworks (such as artificial intelligence, data science, and biophysical models); and
3. The translation of these data and analyses into precision and increasingly automated management of agricultural systems (e.g., fertilizer prescription maps, spot spraying, or precision irrigation through Internet of Things infrastructure).

For example, Basso and Antle (2020) define digital agriculture as “a set of digital and geospatial information technologies that integrates sensors, analytics and automation to monitor, assess and manage soil, climatic and genetic resources at field and landscape scales.” Similarly, Grewer et al. (2026) define digital agriculture as “the integration of: (i) the collection and use of high-resolution spatial and temporal data, (ii) the application of advanced data-processing algorithms and modelling frameworks, and (iii) their translation into precision, semi-automated crop management.”

== Technology ==
Digital agriculture encompasses a wide range of technologies, most of which have multiple applications along the agricultural value chain. These technologies include, but are not limited to:

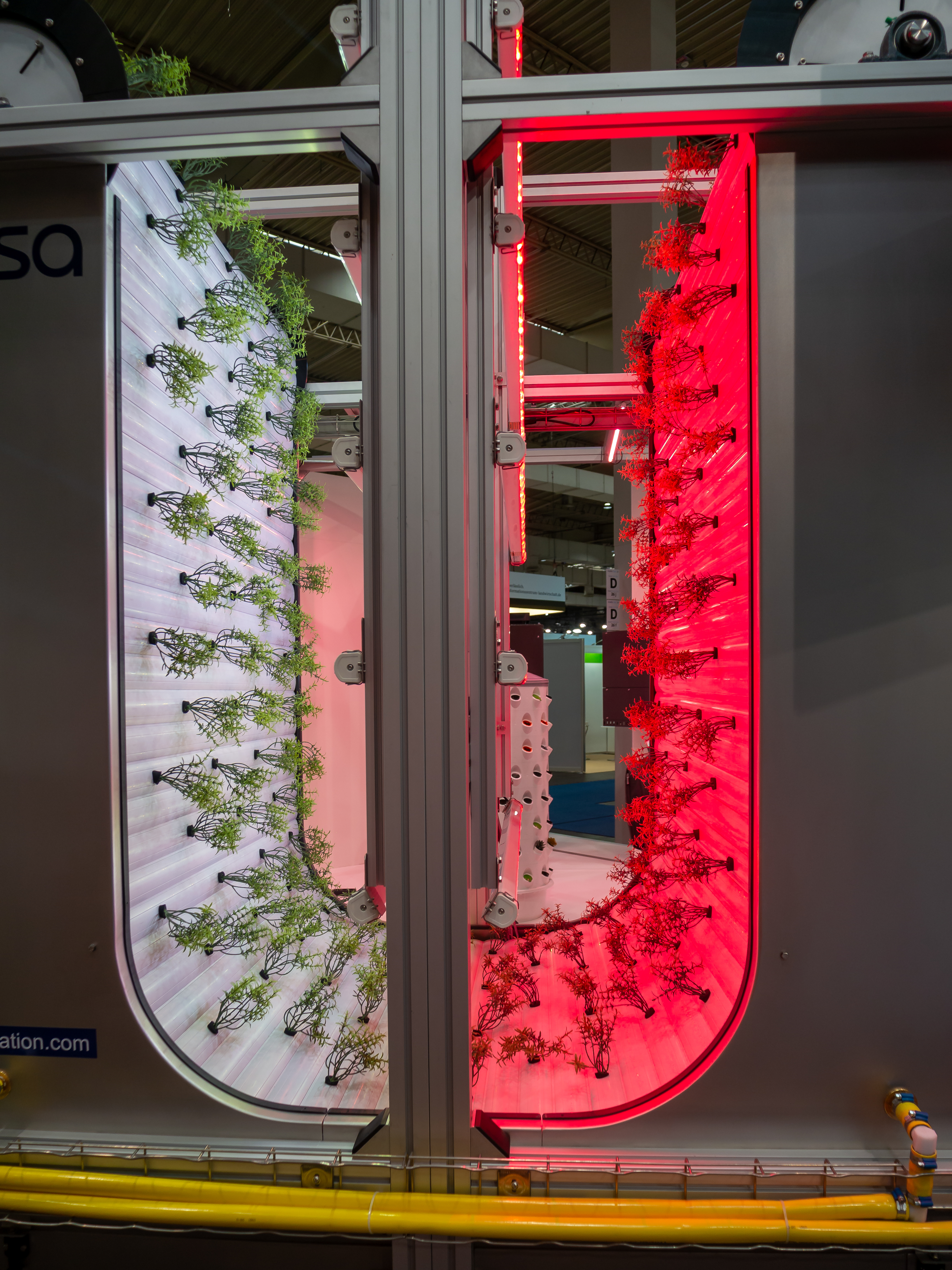
digital agriculture on a conveyor belt

- Cloud computing/big data analysis tools
- Artificial intelligence
- Machine learning
- Distributed ledger technologies, including blockchain and smart contracts
- The Internet of Things, a principle developed by Kevin Ashton that explains how simple mechanical objects can be combined into a network to broaden understanding of that object
- Digital communications technologies, like mobile phones
- Digital platforms, such as e-commerce platforms, like bighaat, agribegri, Krisikart India, which provide digital information and deliver pesticides and other agro products to farmers' doorsteps. Agro-advisory apps, such as plantix, offer quick and economical detection of crop diseases, while e-extension websites help farmers to increase their profits.
- Precision agriculture technologies, including
  - Sensors, including food sensors, soil sensors, and Fuel level sensors
  - Guidance and tracking systems (which provide Vehicle location data and are often enabled by a GPS tracking unit, GNSS, RFID, IoT, or Automatic vehicle location)
  - Variable-rate input technologies
  - Automatic section control
  - Advanced imaging technologies, including satellite and drone imagery, as well as Video telematics (which may use a Dashcam), to look at temperature gradients, fertility gradients, moisture gradients, and anomalies in a field
  - Automated machinery and agricultural robots, whose routes can be optimized using a Journey planner. Such fleets can form a localized Intelligent transportation system on the farm, often managed with a Vehicle tracking system or Fleet telematics system.

== Effects of digital agriculture adoption ==
The FAO estimates the world will need to produce 56% more food (as compared to 2010, under "business as usual" growth) to feed over 9 billion in 2050. Furthermore, the world faces intersecting challenges like malnutrition, climate change, food waste, and changing diets. To produce a "sustainable food future," the world must increase food production while cutting greenhouse gas emissions and maintaining (or reducing) the land used in agriculture. Digital agriculture can potentially address these challenges by making the agricultural value chain more efficient, equitable, and environmentally sustainable.

=== Efficiency ===
Digital technology changes economic activity by lowering the costs of replicating, transporting, tracking, verifying, and searching for data. Due to these falling costs, digital technology can improve efficiency throughout the agricultural value chain.

==== On-farm efficiency ====
On-farm, precision agriculture technologies can minimize inputs required for a given yield. For example, variable-rate application (VRA) technologies can apply precise amounts of water, fertilizer, pesticide, herbicide, etc. A number of empirical studies find that VRA improves input use efficiency. Using VRA alongside geo-spatial mapping, farmers can apply inputs to hyper-localized regions of their farm, sometimes down to the individual plant level. Reducing input use lowers costs and lessens negative environmental impacts. Furthermore, empirical evidence indicates precision agriculture technologies can increase yields. On U.S. peanut farms, guidance systems are associated with a 9% increase in yield, and soil maps are associated with a 13% increase in yield. One study in Argentina found that a precision agriculture approach based on crop physiological principles could result in 54% higher farm output.

Digital agriculture can improve the allocative efficiency of physical capital within and between farms. Often touted as "Uber for tractors," equipment-sharing platforms like Hello Tractor, WeFarmUp, MachineryLink Solutions, TroTro Tractor, and Tringo facilitate farmer rental of expensive machinery, an on-demand model with parallels to Public transport. These platforms are an example of agricultural Fleet management, often coordinated with Fleet management software. By facilitating a market for equipment sharing, telematics technology ensures fewer tractors sit idle and allows owners to make extra income. Furthermore, farmers without the resources to make big investments can better access equipment to improve their productivity; the Fleet digitalization of agriculture provides benefits such as better Fuel management to prevent Gasoline theft, assistance with Stolen vehicle recovery, and even Driver scoring through data collected by an on-board Telematic control unit.

Digital agriculture improves labor productivity through improved farmer knowledge. E-extension (electronic provision of traditional agricultural extension services) allows for farming knowledge and skills to diffuse at low cost. For example, the company Digital Green works with local farmers to create and disseminate videos about agricultural best practices in more than 50 languages. E-extension services can also improve farm productivity via decision-support services on mobile apps or other digital platforms. Using many sources of information, such as weather data, GIS spatial mapping, soil sensor data, and satellite/drone pictures, e-extension platforms can provide real-time recommendations to farmers. For example, the machine-learning-enabled mobile app Plantix, Krisikart India diagnoses crops' diseases, pests, and nutrient deficiencies based on a smartphone photo. In a randomized control trial, Casaburi et al. (2014) found that sugarcane growers who received agricultural advice via SMS messages increased yields by 11.5% relative to the control group.

Finally, digital agriculture improves labor productivity through decreased labor requirements. Automation inherent in precision agriculture, from "milking robots on dairy farms to greenhouses with automated climate control," can make crop and livestock management more efficient by reducing required labor.

==== Off-farm/market efficiency ====
Besides streamlining farm production, digital agriculture technologies can make agricultural markets more efficient. Mobile phones, online ICTs, e-commerce platforms, digital payment systems, and other digital agriculture technologies can mitigate market failures and reduce transaction costs throughout the value chain.

- Reducing information asymmetry: Price information affects competitive markets' efficiency because it impacts price dispersion, arbitrage, and farmer and consumer welfare. Since the marginal cost of digitally delivering information approaches zero, digital agriculture has the potential to spread price information. Aker and Fafchamps find that the introduction of mobile phone coverage in Niger reduced spatial price dispersion for agri-food products, especially for remote markets and perishable goods. Similarly, price information provided by Internet kiosks ("e-choupals") in India led to an increase in farmers' net profits as traders lost monopsony power. Other examples of digital platforms for price information include MFarm and Esoko.
- Matching buyers and sellers: E-commerce lowers the search costs of matching buyers and sellers, potentially shortening the value chain. Rather than go through dozens of intermediaries, farmers can sell directly to consumers. Market access services can also solve the matching problem without necessarily hosting online transactions. For example, Esoko sends market information (prices for specific commodities, market locations, etc.) to agents and farmers, connecting them to commodity buyers. All of these matching platforms help smallholders coordinate with buyers and enter both regional and global value chains. Finally, digital technologies can also facilitate matching in financial and input markets, not just producer-to-consumer output sales.
- Lowering transaction costs in commercial markets: Digital payments, whether integrated in e-commerce platforms or in mobile money accounts, e-wallets, etc., reduce transactions costs within agricultural markets. The need for safe, rapid monetary transactions is particularly apparent in rural areas. Plus, digital payments can provide a gateway to bank accounts, insurance, and credit. Using distributed ledger technologies or smart contracts is another way to reduce trust-related transaction costs in commercial markets. Many retail and food companies have partnered with IBM to develop blockchain pilots related to food safety and traceability, and Alibaba is testing blockchain to reduce fraud in agri-food e-commerce between China and Australia/New Zealand.
- Lowering transaction costs in government services: Digital payments can also streamline government delivery of agricultural subsidies. In 2011, the Nigerian Federal Ministry of Agriculture and Rural Development started delivering fertilizer subsidy vouchers to e-wallets on mobile phones; by 2013, they had reached 4.3 million smallholders nationwide. Compared to the previous program, the e-vouchers cut costs: from 2011 to 2013, the cost per smallholder farmer receiving fertilizer went from US$225–300 to US$22. The e-vouchers also reached more smallholders, increasing from between 600,000-800,000 in 2011 to 4.3 million in 2013. In the second phase of the program, the Nigerian government developed the Nigerian Agricultural Payment Initiative (NAPI), which distributed PIN-enabled ID cards that hold subsidy information and provide access to loans and grants. Other e-wallet/e-voucher systems for agricultural subsidies exist or have been piloted in Colombia, Rwanda, Zambia, Mali, Guinea, and Niger. Besides reducing subsidy costs, governments can harness digital technology to save time. When Estonia implemented their e-ID and X-Road system, time spent applying for agricultural subsidies decreased from 300 minutes to 45 minutes per person.

Typically, a system of digital agriculture technologies, rather than a single tool, is used to solve multifaceted problems. For example, e-commerce solves two efficiency issues: difficulty matching buyers and sellers, especially in rural areas, and the high transaction costs associated with in-person, cash-based trade.

=== Equity ===
Digital agriculture shows promise for creating a more equitable agri-food value chain. Because digital technologies reduce transaction costs and information asymmetries, they can improve smallholder farmers' market access in a number of ways:

==== Financial inclusion ====
Digital agriculture technologies can expand farmers' access to credit, insurance, and bank accounts for a number of reasons. First, digital technology helps alleviate the information asymmetry that exists between farmers and financial institutions. When lenders decide a farmer's credit ceiling or insurance premium, they are usually uncertain about what risks the farmer presents. Digital technology reduces the costs of verifying farmers' expected riskiness. The Kenyan company M-Shwari uses customers' phone and mobile money records to assess creditworthiness. Organizations like FarmDrive and Apollo Agriculture incorporate satellite imagery, weather forecasts, and remote sensor data when calculating farmers' loan eligibility. Drone imagery can confirm a farmer's physical assets or land use and Asset tracking using RFID technology allows stakeholders to monitor livestock, making it easier for insurers to understand farmers' riskiness. In all instances, low-cost digital verification reduces lenders' uncertainty: the questions "will this farmer repay the loan?" and "what risks does this farmer face?" become clearer.

Second, digital technology facilitates trust between farmers and financial institutions. A range of tools create trust, including real-time digital communication platforms and blockchain/distributed ledger technology/smart contracts. In Senegal, a digitalized, supply-chain-tracking system allows farmers to collateralize their rice to obtain the credit necessary for planting. Lenders accept rice as collateral because real-time, digital tracking assures them the product was not lost or damaged in the post-harvest process.

==== Market inclusion ====
Middlemen often extract exorbitant rents from farmers when purchasing their harvest or livestock for several reasons. First, smallholders in remote areas may be unaware of fair market prices. As a result, middlemen (who typically have better information about market conditions and prices) accrue significant market power and profits. A study conducted in the central highlands of Peru found that farmers who received market price information via mobile phone SMS increased their sales prices by 13-14% relative to farmers without access to the information. Second, smallholders produce tiny harvests compared to large producers, so they lack bargaining power with middlemen. If smallholders can aggregate or form a cooperative to sell their products together, they have more leverage. Online platforms and mobile phones can facilitate aggregation, such as Digital Green's Loop app. Third, connecting producers with final consumers can eliminate intermediaries' monopsony power, thereby raising producer profits. As mentioned above in the efficiency section, e-commerce or other market linkage platforms can connect a small farmer directly to consumers around the world.

==== Potential inequities resulting from digital agriculture ====
While digital technologies can facilitate market access and information flow, their benefits may not be evenly distributed, potentially exacerbating existing inequalities. Constraints on adoption can result in benefits accruing primarily to more powerful actors.

- Large farms: When a digital agriculture technology requires much upfront investment, only large farms with sufficient assets and credit access will adopt it. For example, large farms are most likely to adopt precision agriculture technologies because of high costs. Increasingly however, automated mechanization is focusing on more but smaller autonomous machines, instead of fewer but larger machines such as observed with machines that still require human control. This trend enables smaller farms to participate in digital agriculture more evenly with larger farms, as the upfront investment becomes more equal relative to the size of the farm.
- Digital divide: The uneven access to information and communication technologies (ICTs) may lead to uneven adoption of, and thereby uneven gains from, digital agriculture. When digital technologies require specific skills, benefits may accrue to digitally literate farmers positioned to take advantage of such opportunities.
- Gender: Given gender-based disparities in ICT access and the gender gap in agribusiness value chains, men seem more likely to adopt digital agriculture. Therefore, digital technologies could perpetuate gender inequalities in the agricultural sector.
- Unskilled labor: Advances in on-farm productivity, particularly through digitized automation and precision agriculture, may threaten low-skilled jobs. According to the OECD, agriculture will be one of the sectors most affected by automation and McKinsey Global Institute projects that automation will displace 15% of agricultural workers in Mexico and 30% in Germany.
- Agribusinesses and service providers: Increased reliance on big data may increase the power differential between agribusinesses/information service providers and farmers. If smallholders lack access to and/or control of their data, they may lose bargaining power vis-à-vis large value chain actors (like supermarkets) and data collectors.

=== Environment ===
Boosting natural resource efficiency is the "single most important need for a sustainable food future," according to the World Resource Institute. As mentioned in the on-farm efficiency section, precision farming, including variable rate nutrient application, variable rate irrigation, machine guidance, and variable rate planting/seeding, could minimize use of agricultural inputs for a given yield. This could mitigate resource waste and negative environmental externalities, like greenhouse gas (GHG) emissions, soil erosion, and fertilizer runoff. For example, Katalin et al. 2014 estimate that switching to precision weed management could save up to 30,000 tons of pesticide in the EU-25 countries. González-Dugo et al. 2013 found that precision irrigation of a citrus orchard could reduce water use by 25 percent while maintaining a constant yield. Basso et al. 2012 demonstrated that variable-rate application of fertilizer can reduce nitrogen application and leaching without affecting yield and net return.

However, precision agriculture could also accelerate farms' depletion of natural resources because of a rebound effect; increasing input efficiency does not necessarily lead to resource conservation. Also, by changing economic incentives, precision agriculture may hinder environmental policies' effectiveness: "Precision agriculture can lead to higher marginal abatement costs in the form of forgone profits, decreasing producers' responsiveness to those policies." In other words, holding pollution constant, precision agriculture allows a farmer to produce more output, making abatement more expensive.

Off-farm, digital agriculture has the potential to improve environmental monitoring and food system traceability. The monitoring costs of certifying compliance with environmental, health, or waste standards are falling because of digital technology. For example, satellite and drone imagery can track land use and/or forest cover; distributed ledger technologies can enable trusted transactions and exchange of data; food sensors can monitor temperatures to minimize contamination during storage and transport. Together, technologies like these can form digital agriculture traceability systems, which allow stakeholders to track agri-food products in near-real-time. Digital traceability yields a number of benefits, environmental and otherwise:

- Reduced food waste: Of all the food calories produced in a year, 25% are wasted between on-farm production and consumers. Traceability systems facilitate better identification of supply-side weaknesses, such as where and how much food is lost downstream of the farm. Emerging digital innovations, such as milk cartons that track milk from "farm to fridge," can address demand-side waste by providing consumers with more accurate expiration dates.
- Consumer trust: Ensuring food safety, quality, and authenticity has become an important regulatory requirement in high-income countries. Use of RFID tags and blockchain technologies to certify agri-food products' characteristics could provide near-real-time quality signals to consumers.
- Improved producer welfare: Producers who can leverage environmental certification could sell their products at a premium, because blockchain technologies could enable greater trust in labels like "sustainable," "organic" or "fair trade."

== Enabling environment ==
According to the McKinsey Industry Digitization Index, the agricultural sector is the slowest adopter of digital technologies in the United States. Farm-level adoption of digital agriculture varies within and between countries, and uptake differs by technology. Some characterize precision agriculture uptake as rather slow. In the United States in 2010-2012, precision agriculture technologies were used on 30-50% of corn and soybean acreage. Others point out that uptake varies by technology; farmer use of GNSS guidance has grown rapidly, but variable-rate technology adoption rarely exceeds 20% of farms. Furthermore, digital agriculture is not limited to on-farm precision tools, and these innovations typically require less upfront investment. Growing access to ICTs in agriculture and a booming e-commerce market all bode well for increased adoption of digital agriculture downstream of the farm.

Individual farmers' perceptions about usefulness, ease of use, and cost-effectiveness impact the spread of digital agriculture. In addition, a number of broader factors enable the spread of digital agriculture, including:

=== Digital infrastructure ===
Although a few digital technologies can operate in areas with limited mobile phone coverage and internet connectivity, rural network coverage plays an important role in digital agriculture's success. A wide gap exists between developed and developing countries' 3G and 4G cellular coverage, and issues such as dropped calls, delays, and weak signals hamper telecommunications efficacy in rural areas. Even when countries overcome infrastructural challenges, the price of network connectivity can exclude smallholders, poor farmers, and those in remote areas. Similar accessibility and affordability issues exist for digital devices and digital accounts. According to a 2016 GSMA report, of the 750 million-plus farmers in the 69 surveyed countries, about 295 million had a mobile phone; only 13 million had both a mobile phone and a mobile money account. Despite lingering gaps in network coverage, ICT access has skyrocketed in recent years. In 2007, only 1% of people in developing countries used Internet, but by 2015, 40% did. Mobile-broadband subscriptions, which increased thirty-fold between 2005 and 2015, drove much of this growth. As a key enabler of agricultural change, digital infrastructure requires further development, but growing ICT access indicates progress.

=== Agriculture's role in the economy ===
The significance and structure of a country's agricultural sector will affect digital agriculture adoption. For example, a grain-based economy needs difference technologies than a major vegetable producer. Automated, digitally-enabled harvesting systems might make sense for grains, pulses and cotton, but only a few specialty crops generate enough value to justify large investments in mechanized or automated harvesting. Farm size also affects technology choices, as economies of scale make large investments possible (e.g., adoption of precision agriculture is more likely on larger farms). On the other hand, digital agriculture solutions focused on ICTs and e-commerce would benefit an economy dominated by smallholders. In China, where the average farm size is less than 1 ha, Alibaba's customer-to-customer e-commerce platform called Rural Taobao has helped melon growers in Bachu County market their produce all over the country. Other structural factors, such as percent of the population employed in agriculture, farm density, farm mechanization rates, and other factors also impact how different regions adopt digital agriculture.

=== Human capital ===
In order to benefit from the advent of digital agriculture, farmers must develop new skills. As Bronson (2018) notes, "training a rural work-force in Internet technology skills (e.g., coding) is obviously a key part of agricultural "modernization." Integration into the digital economy requires basic literacy (ability to read) and digital literacy (ability to use digital devices to improve welfare). In many instances, benefiting from digital content also requires English literacy or familiarity with another widely spoken language. Digital agriculture developers have designed ways around these barriers, such as ICTs with audio messages and extension videos in local languages. However, more investment in human capital development is needed to ensure all farmers can benefit from digital agriculture.

Fostering human capital in the form of innovation also matters for the spread of digital agriculture. Some characterize digital agriculture innovation, a knowledge- and skills-intensive process, as concentrated in "Big Ag" companies and research universities. However, others describe small-scale entrepreneurs as the "heart of the action." In 2018, ag-tech innovation attracted $1.9 billion in venture capital, and the sector has grown significantly in the last 10 years. Although digital agriculture may be concentrated in a few developed countries because of "structure, institutional, and economic barriers," ag-tech startups have experienced significant growth in Africa, the Caribbean and Pacific, Asia, and Latin America as well.

=== Policy and regulatory environment ===
In order for digital agriculture to spread, national governments, multilateral organizations, and other policymakers must provide a clear regulatory framework so that stakeholders feel confident investing in digital agriculture solutions. Policy designed for the pre-Internet era prevents the advancement of "smart agriculture," as does regulatory ambiguity. Furthermore, a blurry line between personal and business data when discussing family farms complicates data regulation. The unanswered regulatory questions mostly concern big data, and they include:

- Ensuring data privacy and security: Farmers have concerns about who can access their data. Their concerns extend to government use of data; German farmers reported a "lack of data security and excessive transparency vis-à-vis the public authorities." Scholars have issued repeated calls for policymakers to address agricultural data privacy and security.
- Address data ownership: According to the European Parliamentary Research Service, "it is clear that the farmer owns the data generated on his fields." The German Agricultural Society and others concur. However, in practice, farmers lack control over data about themselves and their farms.

Besides establishing regulations to boost stakeholder confidence, policymakers can harness digital agriculture for the provision of public goods. First, the United Nations' Global Open Data for Agriculture and Nutrition (GODAN) calls for open access to agricultural data as a basic right. Rather than stakeholders operating in "data silos," where no one shares information for fear of competition, open data sources (when appropriately anonymized) can foster collaboration and innovation. Open-sourced data can rebalance the power asymmetry between farmers and large agribusinesses who collect data. Second, governments can finance research and development of digital agriculture. For big data analytics tools "to enter the public domain, work for the common good and not just for corporate interests, they need to be funded and developed by public organizations." The United Kingdom, Greece, and other national governments have already announced large investments in digital agriculture. Governments can also engage in private-public R&D partnerships to foster smallholder-oriented digital agriculture projects in developing countries. Lastly, digital agriculture technologies, particularly traceability systems, can improve monitoring of environmental compliance, evaluation of subsidy eligibility, etc.

Finally, when governments and international undertake complementary investments, they can strengthen the enabling environment for digital agriculture. By improving digital infrastructure, choosing digital agriculture technologies appropriate for the regional context, and investing in human capital/digital skills development, policymakers could support digital agriculture.

=== Research environment ===
In the United States, research in digital agriculture is primarily funded by the National Institute of Food and Agriculture (NIFA) which comes under the US Department of Agriculture and to a lesser extent, by the National Science Foundation. Two large institutes applying IoT or artificial intelligence in digital agriculture have been unveiled by these funding organizations working together.

- iot4Ag: The Internet of Things for Precision Agriculture an NSF Engineering Research Center
- COALESCE: COntext-Aware LEarning for Sustainable CybEr-agricultural systems

== Sustainable development goals ==
According to Project Breakthrough, digital agriculture can help advance the United Nations Sustainable Development Goals by providing farmers with more real-time information about their farms, allowing them to make better decisions. Technology improves crop production by providing a better understanding of soil health. It allows farmers to use fewer pesticides on their crops. Soil and weather monitoring reduces water waste. Digital agriculture can lead to economic growth by allowing farmers to get the most production out of their land. The loss of agricultural jobs can be offset by new job opportunities in manufacturing and maintaining the necessary technology for the work. Digital agriculture also enables individual farmers to work in concert, collecting and sharing data using technology.

== See also ==
- Information and communications technology in agriculture
