= National GPS Network =

British satellite base station network

The British National GPS Network, known as OS Net, is a network of global navigation satellite system GNSS base stations covering Great Britain. It is managed by Ordnance Survey.

It provides access to a stable, national coordinate reference system (through downloaded GNSS data) that allows highly accurate location to be determined using suitable equipment, and is used in surveying, construction and precision agriculture industries, among other uses. The use of ground-based stations makes this system more accurate than satellite based GPS systems.

Using a single receiver, without any additional corrections, a civilian user can achieve a positional accuracy equal to 5 m – 10 m 95% of the time, and a height accuracy of 15 m – 20 m 95% of the time. Combined with data or corrections from a service such as OS Net, a positional accuracy of 1 – 2 cm is achievable, depending on the equipment used and environmental factors.
