= Rate sensor =

A rate sensor is a sensor that measures a rate (or rate of change). It may refer to:

- Angular rate sensor
  - Rate gyro
  - Yaw-rate sensor
- Heart rate sensor
- Breath rate sensor
- Oxygen transmission rate sensors
- Moisture vapor transmission rate sensors

== See also ==
- Sensor based Variable Rate Application
