= Adapt-N =

- Industry: Precision Agriculture
- Fate: operated by Agronomic Technology Corp (2013)
- Key people: Steven Sibulkin: CEO; Greg Levow: President & COO; Holly Trytten: CTO; Harold van Es: Inventor; Jeff Melkonian: Inventor
- Services: Nitrogen Management

Adapt-N is a precision nitrogen management solution operated by Agronomic Technology Corp. It was developed at Cornell University. It examines soil, weather, crop, field management data to provide an always-on, field-specific nitrogen recommendation that has been shown to improve financial and environmental performance.

Adapt-N simulates the nitrogen cycle, including nitrogen fixation, nitrification and denitrification through a combination of soil, weather, crop and field management modeling.

== History ==
Adapt-N was funded by several foundations, agronomy groups and the USDA, and started development in 2004 through Cornell University, though some of its thirteen underlying model components have been developed and calibrated since the 1980s. Adapt-N was launched for testing in 2008, field tested with replicated strip trials starting in 2011, and launched commercially on April 1, 2014. The solution is meant to provide improved nutrient management for farmers applying nitrogen to their crops through more accurate, financially beneficial and measurable outcomes.

The commercial launch was executed by Agronomic Technology Corp (ATC) which is a member of Cornell's McGovern Center.

Agronomic Technology Corporation raised an undisclosed amount of funding in the seed round, consisting of investment by farmers.

In November, 2017, ATC and Adapt-N were acquired by the multinational chemical company Yara International.

In March, 2024, Adapt-N was acquired by agricultural technology company Ever.Ag.
