= Nutrient budgeting =

Comparison between nutrients in soil and in crops

Nutrient budgets are comparisons of nutrients applied to the soil to those taken up by crops. A nutrient budget takes into account all the nutrient inputs on a farm and all those removed from the land. The most obvious source of nutrients in this situation is fertilizer, but this is only part of the picture. Other inputs come with rainfall, in supplements brought on to the farm and in effluent – either farm or dairy factory – spread on the land. In addition, nutrients can be moved around the farm – from an area used for growing silage to the area used to feed it out, from paddock to raceway, and within paddocks in dung and urine patches. Nutrients are removed from the farm in stock sold on, products (meat, milk, wool), crops sold or fed out off farm, and through processes such as nitrate leaching, volatilization and phosphate run-off etc.

== Importance ==
An accurate nutrient budget is an important tool to provide an early indication of potential problems arising from (i) a nutrient surplus (inputs>outputs), leading to an accumulation of nutrients and increased risk of loss or (ii) a deficit (outputs>inputs), depleting nutrient reserves and increasing the risk of deficiencies and reduced crop yields. They also provide regulatory authorities with a readily-determined, comparative indicator of environmental impact. Overall, nutrient budgets help ensure that farming practices are conducted in an efficient, economic, and environmentally sustainable manner.

== Assumptions ==
A nutrient budget isn't as exact as a financial statement. An assortment of variables affects each tract of land. For example, some areas may have had too much manure applied over time or it may have been unevenly distributed, and previous flooding could affect results. Limits and assumptions should be incorporated when compiling a budget including the average nutrient removal coefficient values if they are not specific to a certain field.

Soil test
This component is complementary to the budget and lets you know what nutrients are already available to crops and helps you plan input purchases. It is a critical best management practice (BMP) in the 4R strategy.
Yield history
By examining the historical yields of crops take from specific fields, you can calculate nutrient removal over time. Yield history may also help better predict the amount of uptake that will occur with similar crops planted in the future.
Previous applications
Knowing what's been applied to the field in years past will offer insight into what may already be in the ground or what nutrients may no longer be present.
Water
Consider what kind of water has been applied to the field. Does irrigation water contain dissolved nutrients such as nitrogen (N), sulfur (S), or chloride (Cl)? If so, it should be counted as input.
What's around you?
Consider water sources that could run into your field. Is there a manufacturing facility nearby? What makes up these water sources can impact how you plant.

=== Urban and Turfgrass Application ===
Nutrient budgeting has expanded beyond traditional agriculture into Precision Turfgrass Management (PTM). Unlike uniform agricultural fields, urban landscapes and golf courses exhibit high spatial variability in soil composition. High-tech integration using GNSS and soil sensors allows for the creation of site-specific management units. By utilizing Variable-Rate Application (VRA), managers can balance the nutrient budget by applying precise amounts of fertilizer only where uptake potential is highest. This minimizes the surplus side of the budget, reducing nutrient leaching into urban watersheds.

=== Lawn Metabolism and Resource Flux ===
Within the framework of urban metabolism, the concept of Lawn Metabolism is used to quantify the total energy and material throughput of turfgrass systems. Lawns are characterized as high-turnover ecosystems where the balance between photosynthesis and respiration is managed through technical interventions.

Advancements in sensor technology, such as infrared gas analyzers (IRGA) and soil respiration probes, allow for the real-time monitoring of a lawn's metabolic state. These data points are used in precision management to adjust irrigation and fertilization "just-in-time," effectively treating the lawn as a self-regulating biological circuit. This metabolic modeling helps identify the point of diminishing returns where additional inputs (fertilizer or water) no longer result in increased biomass or carbon sequestration, but instead exit the system as waste.

== See also ==
- Fertilizer
- Nutrient management
- Sustainable agriculture
