= Precision agriculture =

Farming management strategy

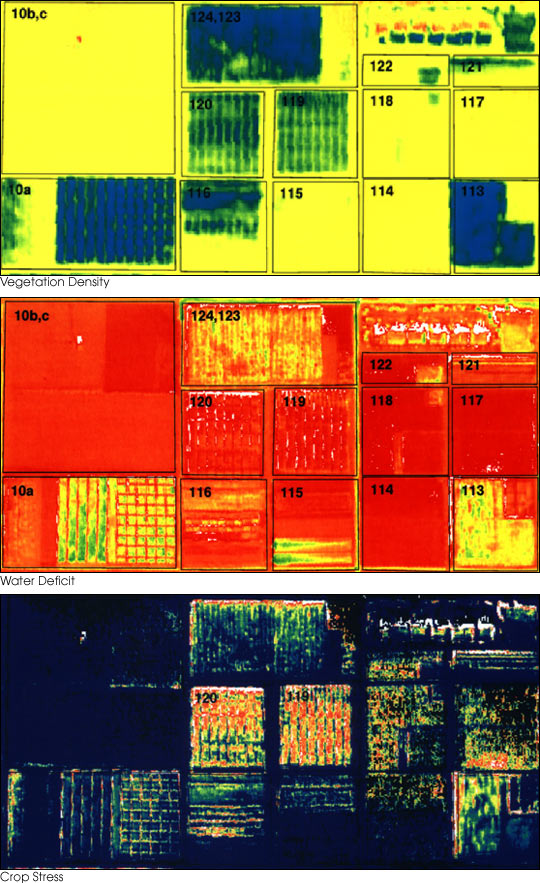
False-color images demonstrate remote sensing applications in precision farming.

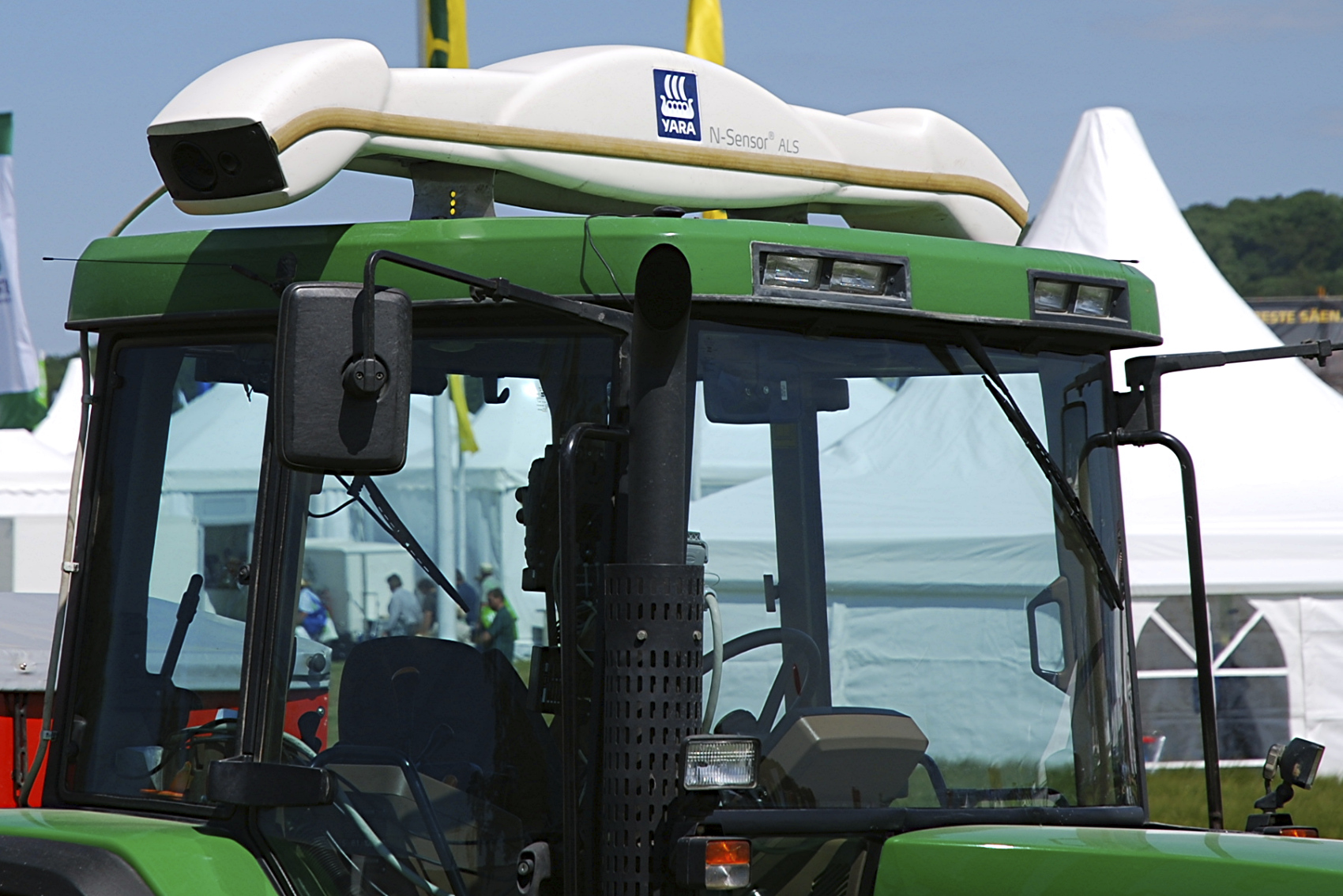
Yara N-Sensor ALS mounted on a tractor's canopy – a system that records light reflection of crops, calculates fertilisation recommendations and then varies the amount of fertilizer spread

Precision agriculture is a management strategy that gathers, processes and analyzes temporal, spatial and individual plant and animal data and combines it with other information to support management decisions according to estimated variability for improved resource use efficiency, productivity, quality, profitability and sustainability of agricultural production. It is used in both crop and livestock production.

A central component of implementing this strategy is the satellite monitoring of agricultural machinery, which forms the basis for modern farm fleet management. This is achieved through the use of fleet telematics systems, where vehicles are equipped with a GPS tracking unit and an onboard controller that transmits telemetry data—such as location, speed, engine hours, and fuel consumption—to a central server for analysis. This stream of real-time data allows for the automation of agricultural operations and provides critical insights for improving diagnosis and decision-making. Beyond machinery, precision agriculture also analyzes the spatial variability within fields, such as how terrain attributes (geomorphology) and soil properties affect crop growth and water distribution (hydrology).[] The goal of precision agriculture research is to define a decision support system for whole farm management with the goal of optimizing returns on inputs while preserving resources.

The practice of precision agriculture has been enabled by the advent of GPS and GNSS. The farmer's and/or researcher's ability to locate their precise position in a field allows for the creation of maps of the spatial variability of as many variables as can be measured (e.g. crop yield, terrain features/topography, organic matter content, moisture levels, nitrogen levels, pH, EC, Mg, K, and others). Similar data is collected by sensor arrays mounted on GPS-equipped combine harvesters. These arrays consist of real-time sensors that measure everything from chlorophyll levels to plant water status, along with multispectral imagery. This data is used in conjunction with satellite imagery by variable rate technology (VRT) including seeders, sprayers, etc. to optimally distribute resources. However, recent technological advances have enabled the use of real-time sensors directly in soil, which can wirelessly transmit data without the need of human presence.

Precision agriculture can benefit from unmanned aerial vehicles, that are relatively inexpensive and can be operated by novice pilots. These agricultural drones can be equipped with multispectral or RGB cameras to capture many images of a field that can be stitched together using photogrammetric methods to create orthophotos. These multispectral images contain multiple values per pixel in addition to the traditional red, green blue values such as near infrared and red-edge spectrum values used to process and analyze vegetative indexes such as NDVI maps. These drones are capable of capturing imagery and providing additional geographical references such as elevation, which allows software to perform map algebra functions to build precise topography maps. These topographic maps can be used to correlate crop health with topography, the results of which can be used to optimize crop inputs such as water, fertilizer or chemicals such as herbicides and growth regulators through variable rate applications.

== History ==
Precision agriculture is a key component of the third wave of modern agricultural revolutions. The first agricultural revolution was the increase of mechanized agriculture, from 1900 to 1930. Each farmer produced enough food to feed about 26 people during this time. The 1960s prompted the Green Revolution with new methods of genetic modification, which led to each farmer feeding about 156 people. It is expected that by 2050, the global population will reach about 9.6 billion, and food production must effectively double from current levels in order to feed every mouth. With new technological advancements in the agricultural revolution of precision farming, each farmer will be able to feed 265 people on the same acreage.

== Overview ==
The first wave of the precision agricultural revolution came in the forms of satellite and aerial imagery, weather prediction, variable rate fertilizer application, and crop health indicators. The second wave aggregates the machine data for even more precise planting, topographical mapping, and soil data.

Precision agriculture aims to optimize field-level management with regard to:

- crop science: by matching farming practices more closely to crop needs (e.g. fertilizer inputs);
- environmental protection: by reducing environmental risks and footprint of farming (e.g. limiting leaching of nitrogen);
- economics: by boosting competitiveness through more efficient practices (e.g. improved management of fertilizer usage and other inputs).

Precision agriculture also provides farmers with a wealth of information to:

- build up a record of their farm
- improve decision-making
- foster greater traceability
- enhance marketing of farm products
- improve lease arrangements and relationships with landlords
- enhance the inherent quality of farm products (e.g. protein level in bread-flour wheat)

=== Prescriptive planting ===
Prescriptive planting is a type of farming system that delivers data-driven planting advice that can determine variable planting rates to accommodate varying conditions across a single field, in order to maximize yield. It has been described as "Big Data on the farm." Monsanto, DuPont and others are launching this technology in the US.

== Principles ==
Precision agriculture uses many tools, but some of the basics include tractors, combines, sprayers, planters, and diggers, which are all considered auto-guidance systems. The small devices on the equipment that use GIS (geographic information system) are what makes precision agriculture what it is; the GIS system can be thought of as the “brain”. To be able to use precision agriculture, the equipment needs to be wired with the right technology and data systems. More tools include Variable rate technology (VRT), Global positioning system, Geographical information system, Grid sampling, and remote sensors.

=== Geolocating ===
Geolocating a field enables the farmer to overlay information gathered from the analysis of soils and residual nitrogen, and information on previous crops and soil resistivity. Geolocation is done in two ways

- The field is delineated using an in-vehicle GPS device as the farmer drives a tractor around the field.
- The field is delineated on a basemap derived from aerial or satellite imagery. The base images must have the right level of resolution and geometric quality to ensure that geolocation is sufficiently accurate.

=== Variables ===
Intra and inter-field variability may result from a number of factors. These include climatic conditions (hail, drought, rain, etc.), soils (texture, depth, nitrogen levels), cropping practices (no-till farming), weeds, and disease. Permanent indicators—chiefly soil indicators—provide farmers with information about the main environmental constants. Point indicators allow them to track a crop's status, i.e., to see whether diseases are developing, if the crop is suffering from water stress, nitrogen stress, or lodging, whether it has been damaged by ice, and so on. This information may come from weather stations and other sensors (soil electrical resistivity, detection with the naked eye, satellite imagery, etc.). Soil resistivity measurements combined with soil analysis make it possible to measure moisture content. Soil resistivity is also a relatively simple and cheap measurement.

=== Strategies ===
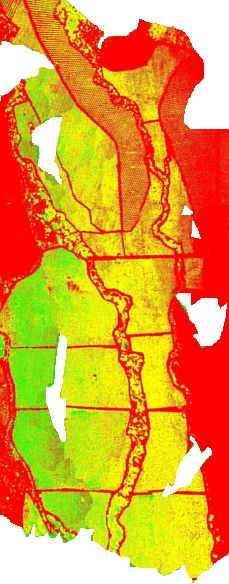
NDVI image taken with small aerial system Stardust II in one flight (299 images mosaic)

Using soil maps, farmers can pursue two strategies to adjust field inputs:

- Predictive approach: based on analysis of static indicators (soil, resistivity, field history, etc.) during the crop cycle.
- Control approach: information from static indicators is regularly updated during the crop cycle by:
  - sampling: weighing biomass, measuring leaf chlorophyll content, weighing fruit, etc.
  - remote sensing: measuring parameters like temperature (air/soil), humidity (air/soil/leaf), wind or stem diameter is possible thanks to Wireless Sensor Networks and Internet of things (IoT)
  - proxy-detection: in-vehicle sensors measure leaf status; this requires the farmer to drive around the entire field.
  - aerial or satellite remote sensing: multispectral imagery is acquired and processed to derive maps of crop biophysical parameters, including indicators of disease. Airborne instruments are able to measure the amount of plant cover and to distinguish between crops and weeds.

Decisions may be based on decision-support models (crop simulation models and recommendation models) based on big data, but in the final analysis it is up to the farmer to decide in terms of business value and impacts on the environment- a role being taken over by artificial intelligence (AI) systems based on machine learning and artificial neural networks.

It is important to realize why PA technology is or is not adopted, "for PA technology adoption to occur the farmer has to perceive the technology as useful and easy to use. It might be insufficient to have positive outside data on the economic benefits of PA technology as perceptions of farmers have to reflect these economic considerations."

=== Implementing practices ===
New information and communication technologies make field-level crop management more operational and easier to achieve for farmers. Application of crop management decisions calls for agricultural equipment that supports variable-rate technology (VRT), for example varying seed density along with the variable-rate application (VRA) of nitrogen and phytosanitary products.

Precision agriculture uses technology on agricultural equipment (e.g. tractors, sprayers, harvesters, etc.):

- positioning system (e.g. GPS trackers that use satellite signals to precisely determine a position on the globe);
- geographic information systems (GIS), i.e., software that makes sense of all the available data;
- variable-rate farming equipment (seeder, spreader).

== Usage around the world ==
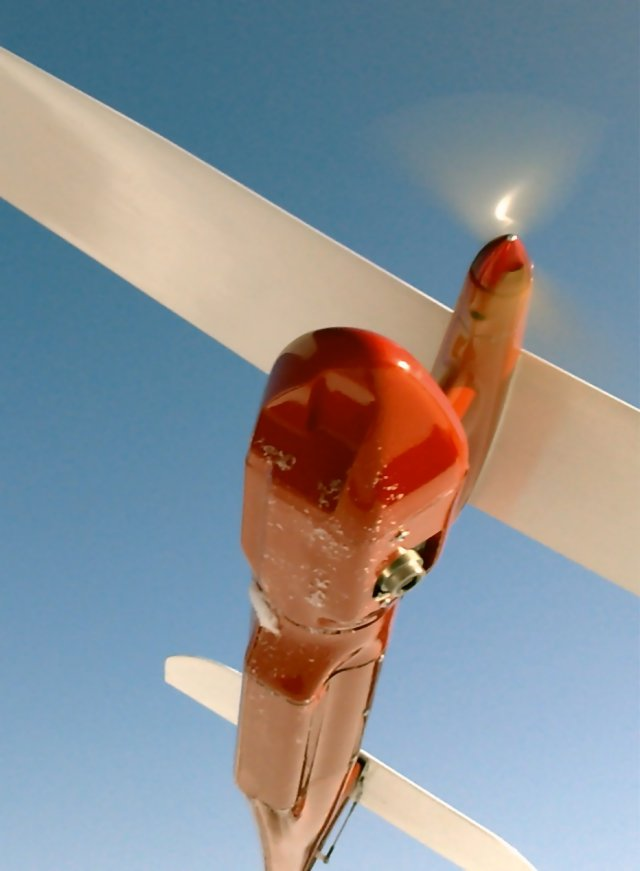
Pteryx UAV, a civilian UAV for aerial photography and photo mapping with roll-stabilised camera head

The concept of precision agriculture first emerged in the United States in the early 1980s. In 1985, researchers at the University of Minnesota varied lime inputs in crop fields. It was also at this time that the practice of grid sampling appeared (applying a fixed grid of one sample per hectare). Towards the end of the 1980s, this technique was used to derive the first input recommendation maps for fertilizers and pH corrections. The use of yield sensors developed from new technologies, combined with the advent of GPS receivers, has been gaining ground ever since. Today, such systems cover several million hectares.

In the American Midwest (US), it is associated not with sustainable agriculture but with mainstream farmers who are trying to maximize profits by spending money only in areas that require fertilizer. This practice allows the farmer to vary the rate of fertilizer across the field according to the need identified by GPS guided Grid or Zone Sampling. Fertilizer that would have been spread in areas that do not need it can be placed in areas in need, thereby optimizing its use.

Around the world, precision agriculture developed at a varying pace. Precursor nations were the United States, Canada and Australia. In Europe, the United Kingdom was the first to go down this path, followed closely by France, where it first appeared in 1997–1998. In Latin America the leading country is Argentina, where it was introduced in the middle 1990s with the support of the National Agricultural Technology Institute. Brazil established a state-owned enterprise, Embrapa, to research and develop sustainable agriculture. The development of GPS and variable-rate spreading techniques helped to anchor precision farming management practices. Today, less than 10% of France's farmers are equipped with variable-rate systems. Uptake of GPS is more widespread, but this hasn't stopped them using precision agriculture services, which supplies field-level recommendation maps.

While digital technologies can transform the landscape of agricultural machinery, making mechanization both more precise and more accessible, non-mechanized production is still dominant in many low- and middle-income countries, especially in sub-Saharan Africa. Research on precision agriculture for non-mechanized production is increasing and so is its adoption. Examples include the AgroCares hand-held soil scanner, uncrewed aerial vehicle (UAV) services (also known as drones), and GNSS to map field boundaries and establish land tenure. However, it is not clear how many agricultural producers actually use digital technologies.

Precision livestock farming supports farmers in real-time by continuously monitoring and controlling animal productivity, environmental impacts, and health and welfare parameters. Sensors attached to animals or to barn equipment operate climate control and monitor animals’ health status, movement and needs. For example, cows can be tagged with the electronic identification (EID) that allows a milking robot to access a database of udder coordinates for specific cows. Global automatic milking system sales have increased over recent years, but adoption is likely mostly in Northern Europe, and likely almost absent in low- and middle-income countries. Automated feeding machines for both cows and poultry also exist, but data and evidence regarding their adoption trends and drivers is likewise scarce.

The economic and environmental benefits of precision agriculture have also been confirmed in China, but China is lagging behind countries such as Europe and the United States because the Chinese agricultural system is characterized by small-scale family-run farms, which makes the adoption rate of precision agriculture lower than other countries. Therefore, China is trying to better introduce precision agriculture technology into its own country and reduce some risks, paving the way for China's technology to develop precision agriculture in the future.

In December 2014, the Russian President made an address to the Russian Parliament where he called for a National Technology Initiative. It is divided into subcomponents such as the FoodNet initiative. The FoodNet initiative contains a set of declared priorities, such as precision agriculture. This field is of special interest to Russia as an important tool in developing elements of the bioeconomy in Russia.

== Economic and environmental impacts ==
Precision agriculture, as the name implies, means the application of precise and correct amounts of inputs like water, fertilizer, pesticides, etc. at the correct time to the crop to increase its productivity and maximize its yields. Precision agriculture management practices can significantly reduce the amount of nutrient and other crop inputs used while boosting yields. Farmers thus obtain a return on their investment by saving on water, pesticide, and fertilizer costs.

The second, larger-scale benefit of targeting inputs concerns environmental impacts. Applying the right amount of chemicals in the right place and at the right time benefits crops, soils and groundwater, and thus the entire crop cycle. Consequently, precision agriculture has become a cornerstone of sustainable agriculture, since it respects crops, soils and farmers. Sustainable agriculture seeks to assure a continued supply of food within the ecological, economic and social limits required to sustain production in the long term.

A 2013 article tried to show that precision agriculture can help farmers in developing countries like India.

Precision agriculture reduces the pressure of agriculture on the environment by increasing the efficiency of machinery and putting it into use. For example, the use of fleet digitalization techniques and GPS trackers reduces fuel consumption for agriculture, while variable rate application of nutrients or pesticides can potentially reduce the use of these inputs, thereby saving costs and reducing harmful runoff into the waterways.

GPS also reduces the amount of compaction to the ground by following previously made guidance lines. This will also allow for less time in the field and reduce the environmental impact of the equipment and chemicals.

Precision agriculture produces large quantities of varied sensing data which creates an opportunity to adapt and reuse such data for archaeology and heritage work, enhancing understanding of archaeology in contemporary agricultural landscapes.

== Emerging technologies ==
Precision agriculture is an application of breakthrough digital farming technologies. Over $4.6 billion has been invested in agriculture tech companies—sometimes called agtech.

=== Robots ===
Driverless tractors have advanced significantly in the 2000s. The tractor does most of the work, with the farmer stepping in for emergencies. Technology is advancing towards driverless machinery programmed by GPS to spread fertilizer or plow land. Autonomy of technology is driven by the demanding need for diagnoses, often difficult to accomplish solely by hands-on farmer-operated machinery. In many instances of high rates of production, manual adjustments cannot be sustained. Other innovations include, partly solar powered, machines/robots that identify weeds and precisely kill them with a dose of a herbicide or lasers.

Agricultural robots have been used for applications including weed control, herbicide application, picking, harvesting, seeding, and planting. Advanced harvesting robots are being developed to identify ripe fruits, adjust to their shape and size, and carefully pluck them from branches.

=== Drones and satellite imagery ===
Drone and satellite technology are used in precision farming. This often occurs when drones take high-quality images while satellites capture the bigger picture. Aerial photography from light aircraft can be combined with data from satellite records to predict future yields based on the current level of field biomass. Aggregated images can create contour maps to track where water flows, determine variable-rate seeding, and create yield maps of areas that were more or less productive.

=== The Internet of things ===
The Internet of things is the network of physical objects outfitted with electronics that enable data collection and aggregation. IoT comes into play with the development of sensors and farm-management software. For example, farmers can spectroscopically measure nitrogen, phosphorus, and potassium in liquid manure, which is notoriously inconsistent. They can then scan the ground to see where cows have already urinated and apply fertilizer to only the spots that need it. This cuts fertilizer use by up to 30%. Moisture sensors in the soil determine the best times to remotely water plants. The irrigation systems can be programmed to switch which side of the tree trunk they water based on the plant's need and rainfall.

Innovations are not just limited to plants—they can be used for the welfare of animals. Cattle can be outfitted with internal sensors to keep track of stomach acidity and digestive problems. External sensors track movement patterns to determine the cow's health and fitness, sense physical injuries, and identify the optimal times for breeding. All this data from sensors can be aggregated and analyzed to detect trends and patterns.

As another example, monitoring technology can be used to make beekeeping more efficient. Honeybees are of significant economic value and provide a vital service to agriculture by pollinating a variety of crops. Monitoring of a honeybee colony's health via wireless temperature, humidity, and CO_{2} sensors helps to improve the productivity of bees, and to read early warnings in the data that might threaten the very survival of an entire hive.

=== Smartphone applications ===
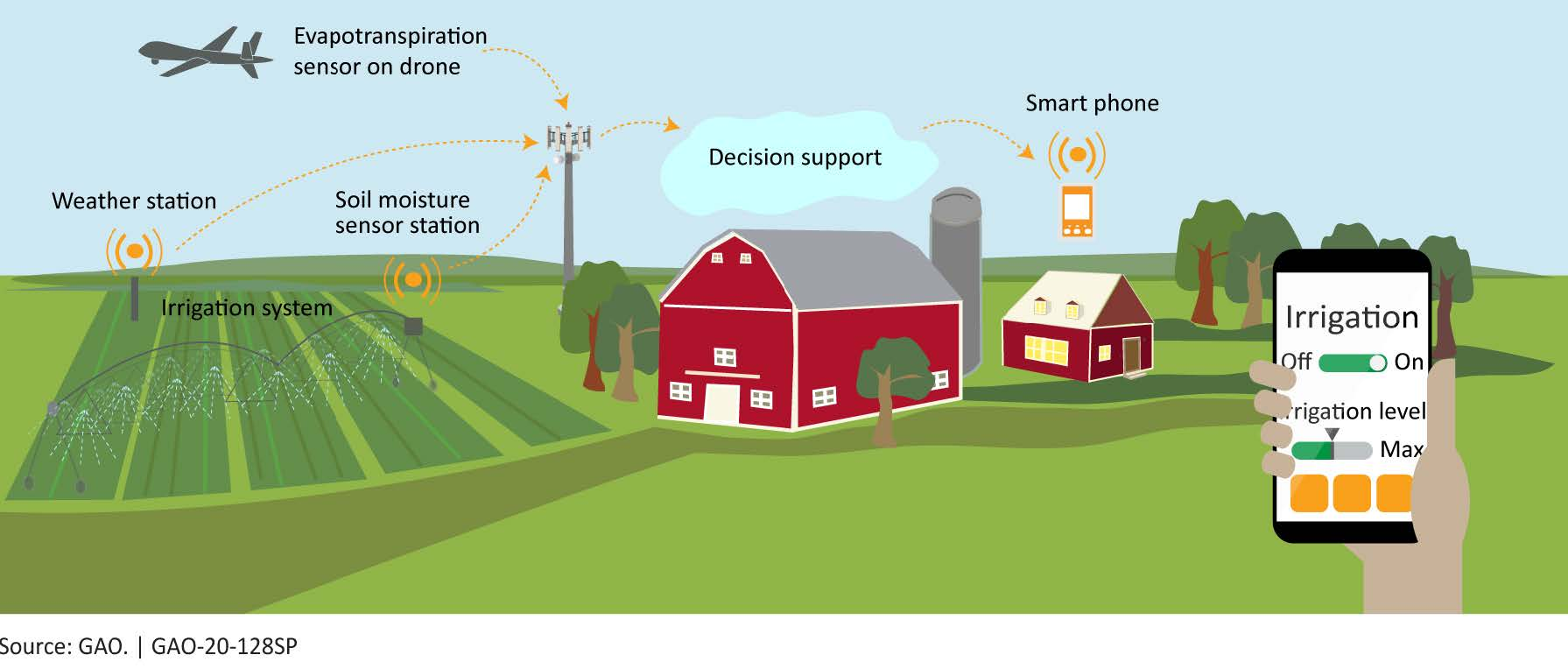
A possible configuration of a smartphone-integrated precision agriculture system

Smartphone and tablet applications are becoming increasingly popular in precision agriculture. Smartphones come with many useful applications already installed, including the camera, microphone, GPS, and accelerometer. There are also applications made dedicated to various agriculture applications such as field mapping, tracking animals, obtaining weather and crop information, and more. They are easily portable, affordable, and have high computing power.

=== Machine learning ===
Machine learning is commonly used in conjunction with drones, robots, and internet of things devices. It allows for the input of data from each of these sources. The computer then processes this information and sends the appropriate actions back to these devices. This allows for robots to deliver the perfect amount of fertilizer or for IoT devices to provide the perfect quantity of water directly to the soil. Machine learning may also provide predictions to farmers at the point of need, such as the contents of plant-available nitrogen in soil, to guide fertilization planning. As more agriculture becomes ever more digital, machine learning will underpin efficient and precise farming with less manual labour.

== Precision agriculture education ==
The agricultural industry, including teachers, is still in the relatively early stages of precision agriculture technologies. Precision agriculture has led many to believe that industry-related technologies should lead research and education instead of the other way around. In classrooms, conferences, workshops, and field days, educators of precision agriculture have struggled to keep up with the number of questions being asked. Training people to use precision agriculture technologies has proven difficult, in contrast to teaching the fundamental ideas and concepts, which have been intuitive and rather straightforward.

== Conferences ==
- InfoAg Conference
- European conference on Precision Agriculture (ECPA) (biennial)
- International Conference on Precision Agriculture (ICPA) (biennial)

== See also ==
- Automatic milking – Milking of dairy animals without human labour
- Digital agriculture – Electronic agricultural data collection, storage, analysis, and sharing
- Fleet management – Strategies for managing commercial vehicles
- Fleet telematics system
- Geostatistics – Branch of statistics focusing on spatial data sets
- Integrated farming – Holistic agricultural management system
- Integrated pest management – Approach for economic control of pests
- Landsat program – American network of Earth-observing satellites for international research purposes
- Nutrient budgeting – Comparison between nutrients in soil and in crops
- Nutrient management – Management of nutrients in agriculture
- Phytobiome – Community of plants (phyto) situated in their specific ecological areas (biome)
- Precision beekeeping – Monitoring of individual bee colonies
- Precision fermentation – Biological manufacturing process
- Precision livestock farming – Automated tools and methods for livestock management
- Precision viticulture – Precision farming applied to optimize vineyard performance
- Satellite crop monitoring
- SPOT (satellites) – Commercial Earth-imaging satellite system operated by the French space agency CNES
- Vehicle tracking system – System to track the location of a vehicle
- Variable rate technology – Precise use of a material in agriculture

== Sources ==
This article incorporates text from a free content work. Licensed under CC BY-SA 3.0 (license statement/permission). Text taken from In Brief to The State of Food and Agriculture 2022 – Leveraging automation in agriculture for transforming agrifood systems, FAO, FAO.
