= Satellite crop monitoring =

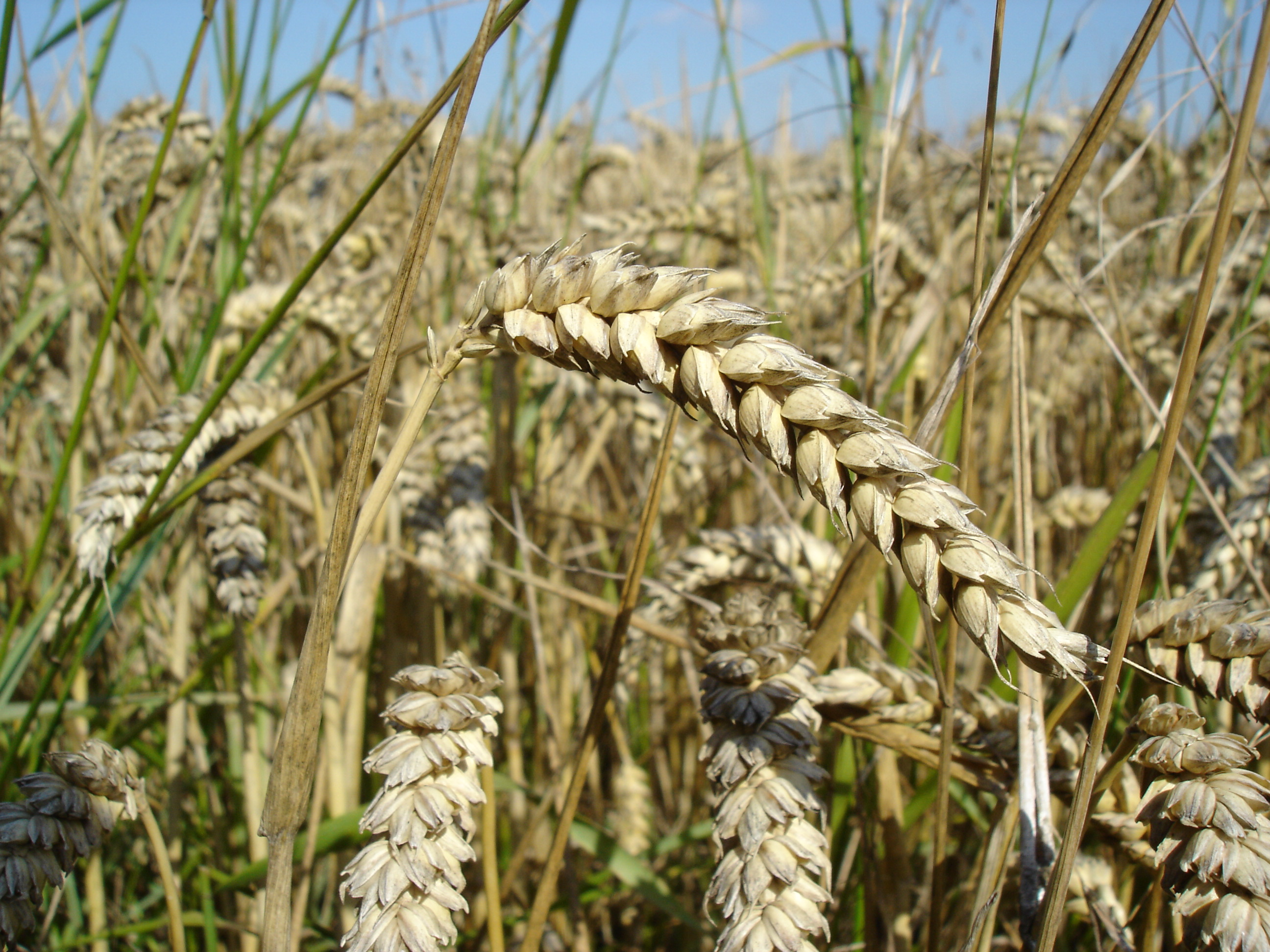
Crop Health Monitoring - e.g. color, size

Satellite crop monitoring is the technology which facilitates real-time crop vegetation index monitoring via spectral analysis of high resolution satellite images for different fields and crops which enables to track positive and negative dynamics of crop development. The difference in vegetation index informs about single-crop development disproportions that speaks for the necessity of additional agriculture works on particular field zones—that is because satellite crop monitoring belongs to precision agriculture methods.

Satellite crop monitoring technology allows to perform online crop monitoring on different fields, located in different areas, regions, even countries and on different continents. The technology's advantage is a high automation level of sown area condition and its interpretation in an interactive map which can be read by different groups of users.

Satellite crop monitoring technology users are:

- agronomists and agriculture companies management (crop vegetation control, crop yield forecasting, management decisions optimization);
- business owners (business prospects estimates, making reasonable decisions on capital investments, providing information for management decisions);
- investors and investment analysts (investment potential estimation, making investment decisions, making sustainable forecasts);
- agriculture consultants and crop advisors (providing remote-sensing-based advisory services; integrating satellite imagery, vegetation indices, weather analytics, and scouting tools to optimize client field health, resource use, yield potential, and consulting reach);
- insurance brokers (data collection, clients claims verification, scale of rates and insurance premium amounts calculation);
- agriculture machinery producers (integration of crop monitoring solutions with agriculture machinery board computers operations, functional development);
- state and sectoral organisations engaged in agriculture, food security and ecological problems.

== See also ==
- Normalized Difference Vegetation Index
- Precision agriculture
- Remote sensing
- Satellite imaging
