= Precision beekeeping =

Monitoring of individual bee colonies

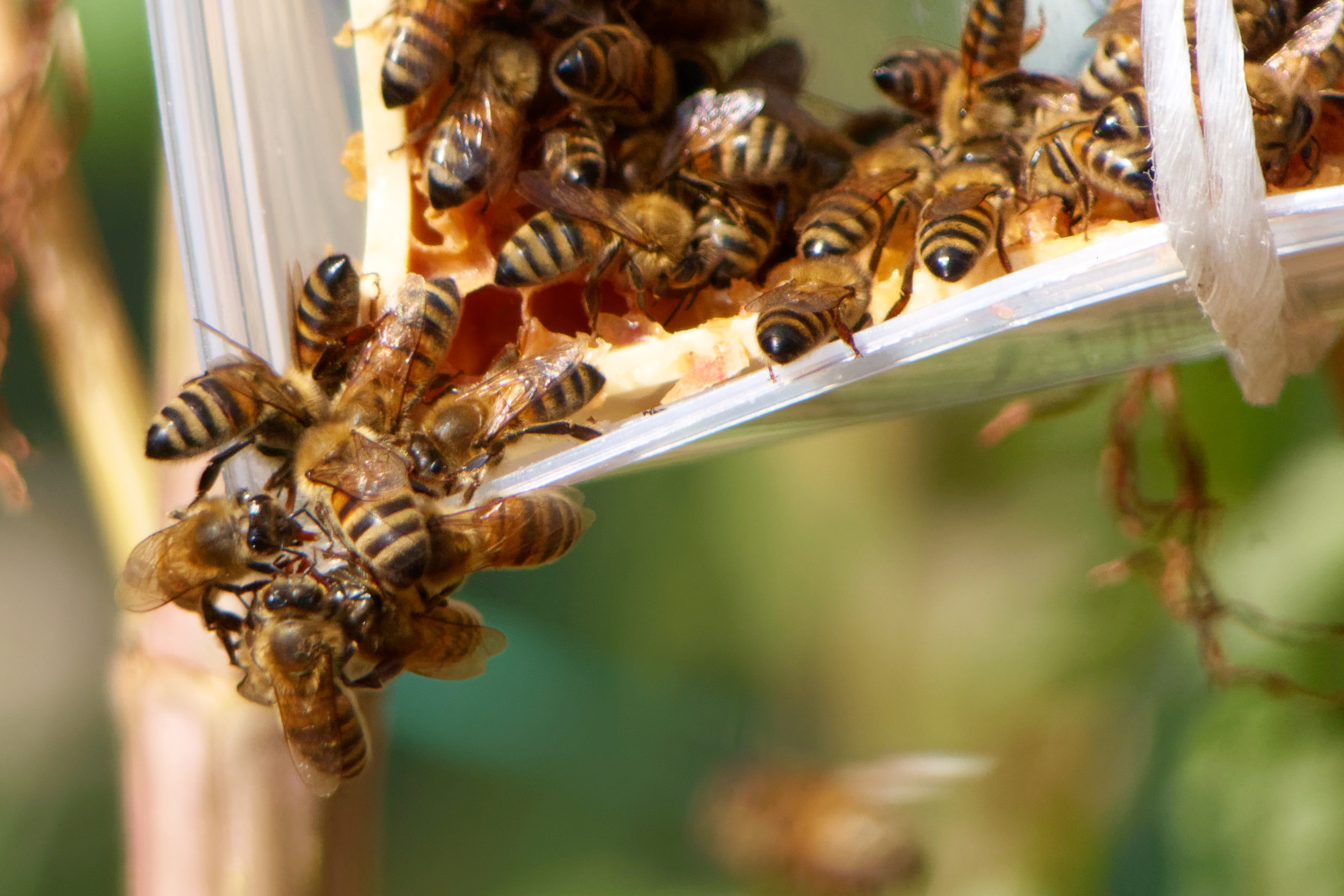

Precision beekeeping (PB) (also known as precision apiculture) is an apiary management strategy based on the monitoring of individual bee colonies to minimize resource consumption and maximize the productivity of bees. It can be considered a branch of precision agriculture. Similar to it, implementation of Precision Beekeeping can also be split into three phases: data collection, data analysis and application. During the data collection phase, measurements from bee colonies and the environment are collected. The data analysis phase draws conclusions regarding bee colony behaviour and activity trends based on measurement data, predefined models and expert knowledge. In the application phase, decisions are made and actions undertaken based on data analysis for improving apiary performance.

One of the main objectives of PB is to implement real time and on-line tools for continuous monitoring of bee colonies during their life and production stage using the automatic, automated and information technology based solutions, without exposing the bees to avoidable stress and waste of resources.

== Bee colony monitoring ==
Various technologies can be applied for monitoring the bee colony and implementation of data collection phase. The data collection process in PB can be classified into three groups 1) apiary-level parameters (meteorological parameters and video observation); 2) colony-level parameters (temperature, humidity, gas content, sound, video, vibration of hive and weight); 3) individual bee-related parameters (the number of incoming/outgoing bees, the number of bees in the hive entrance area).

Temperature measurements of bee colonies have the longest history. Nowadays, bee colony temperature measurements seem to be the simplest and cheapest way to monitor bee colonies. The low costs of data collection, processing and data transfer of temperature measurement systems facilitate application of temperature measurements in beekeeping. Monitoring of the bee colony temperature can be performed using various methods and technologies: 1) Manual temperature measurements, measurements by different loggers and iButtons; 2) Wired sensor networks; 3) Wireless sensor networks; 4) Infrared imaging. Temperature data can help to identify such colony states as: 1) death; 2) swarming; 3) brood rearing; 4) broodless state.

Weight monitoring of the colony can be used to identify: 1) occurrence of nectar flow during the foraging season; 2) consumption of food during non-foraging periods; 3) the occurrence of swarming events through a decrease in the hive weight; 4) estimation of the number of foragers. There are two ways of measuring the weight of the colony: 1) automatic measurements, which can be made using industrial scales; 2) manual weight measurements.

Audio signals and audio processing techniques can be applied to estimate bee behaviour. Many devices and methods have been developed for sound analysis but they are not widely applied in industrial beekeeping. So far, the solutions seem to work only in the hands of researchers. The reason for this may be the large stochastic component in the buzz of a colony and the complexity of sound interpretation. As well means of a simple transducer secured to the outside wall of a hive, a set of statistically independent instantaneous vibration signals of honey bees can be identified and monitored in time using a fully automated and non-invasive method.
