= Ammonia volatilization from urea =

Urea (46-0-0) accounts for more than fifty percent of the world's nitrogenous fertilizers. It is found in granular or prill form, which allows urea to be easily stored, transported and applied in agricultural settings. It is also the cheapest form of granular nitrogen fertilizer. Since urea is not an oxidizer at standard temperature and pressure, it is safer to handle and less of a security risk than other common nitrogen fertilizers, such as ammonium nitrate. However, if urea is applied to the soil surface, a meaningful fraction of applied fertilizer nitrogen may be lost to the atmosphere as ammonia gas; this only occurs under certain conditions.

== Breakdown of urea ==
For plants to absorb nitrogen from urea it must first be broken down:

$(NH_{2})_{2}CO + H_{2}O \stackrel{urease}{\rightarrow} NH_{3} + H_{2}NCOOH \rightarrow2NH_{3(gas)} + CO_{2(gas)}$

Urease is a naturally occurring enzyme that catalyzes the hydrolysis of urea to unstable carbamic acid. Rapid decomposition of carbamic acid occurs without enzyme catalysis to form ammonia and carbon dioxide. The ammonia will likely escape to the atmosphere unless it reacts with water to form ammonium (NH_{4}^{+}) according to the following reaction:

$NH_{3(gas)} + H_{2}O \rightarrow NH^{+}_{4} + OH^{-}$

This is important because ammonium is a plant available source of nitrogen while ammonia is not. Additionally, the formation of the hydroxide ion may cause soils around the applied urea particle to have a pH around 9.0 which increases ammonia volatilization. This area is also highly toxic due to elevated ammonia concentration for several hours so it is recommended that urea based fertilizers not be applied or banded with planted seed at a rate that exceeds 10–20 kg/ha, depending on the crop species. It is important that there is adequate moisture because up to thirty percent of the available nitrogen can be lost through atmospheric volatilization within seventy-two hours of application.

== Management considerations ==
Ammonia volatilization reduces the economic efficiency of agricultural cropping systems. Either yield will be reduced or additional costs will be incurred from additional nitrogen fertilizer. The amount of ammonia volatilization depends on several environmental factors, including temperature, pH, and the soil water content. Additionally, the amount of surface residue and time between urea application and precipitation are also critical. Generally speaking, volatilization will be lower when urea is applied during the wetter and cooler conditions that generally occur in early spring (March and April). However, drying surface soil and rising temperatures as spring progresses increases the probability of ammonia volatilization. Ideally, a manager should attempt to apply nitrogen immediately before a moderate rain event (0.1 inch), allowing urea to dissolve and move into the soil. However, this is not always possible. The soil's pH also has a strong effect on the amount of volatilization. Specifically, highly alkaline soils (pH~8.2 or higher) have proven to increase urea hydrolysis. One study has shown complete hydrolysis of urea within two days of application on such soils. In acidic soils (pH 5.2) the urea took twice as long to hydrolyze. Surface residues, such as thatch and plant stubble exhibit increased urease activity. Soils that have high organic matter content also tend to have higher urease concentrations. More urease results in greater hydrolysis of urea and ammonia volatilization, particularly if urea fails to move into the soil.

== Urease inhibitors ==
Fertilizer is often applied when field conditions are not optimal, particularly in large scale operations. Most studies, indicate that nitrogen losses can be reduced in these situations when a urease inhibitor is applied to the fertilizer. Urease inhibitors prevent the urease enzyme from breaking down the urea. This increases the probability that urea will be absorbed into the soil after a rain event rather than volatilized into the atmosphere. This causes subsequent hydrolyzation to occur below the soil surface and decreases atmospheric losses. The use of inhibitors also decreases the localized zones of high pH common with untreated urea.

== See also ==
- Controlled-release fertiliser
- Nitrogen cycle
