= Plantix =

Mobile crop advisory app

- Developer: PEAT GmbH
- Release: 2015
- Operating system: Android
- Type: crop advisory app
- Website: plantix.net

Plantix is a mobile crop advisory app for farmers, extension workers and gardeners. Plantix was developed by PEAT GmbH, a Berlin-based AI startup. The app is capable of diagnosing plant damages (caused by pests, diseases or nutrient deficiencies) based on digital images of symptoms. It then suggests pesticides and herbicides and connects users with local sellers of these inputs, taking a commission on app-generated pesticide sales. Since its inception, the start-up's founders and employees have claimed that Plantix reduces the use of environmentally harmful pesticides—a claim that is increasingly being challenged due to the company's industry-dependent business model and the lack of robust evidence to support the claim.

== History ==
PEAT GmbH launched the Plantix app in 2015. In April 2020, PEAT acquired the Swiss-Indian startup Salesbee. The company has been featured in major media outlets such as BBC, Fortune, Wired, MIT technology review and Nature. It has also been awarded with the CeBITInnovation Award and the USAID digital smart farming award and the Worlds Summit Award, by the United Nation. In 2023, the company was acquired by the chemical marketing company Helm AG.

=== Collaborators ===
Plantix cooperates with international research institutes and inter-governmental organizations such as ICRISAT (International Crops Research Institute for Semi-arid Tropics), CIMMYT (International Maize and Wheat Improvement Center) and CABI (Center for Agriculture and Bioscience International).
