= Digital Green =

Non-governmental organization

Digital Green is an independent non-governmental organization that focuses on training farmers to make and show short videos where they record their problems, share solutions and highlight success stories. It was first conceived as a project in Microsoft Research India's Technology for Emerging Markets in 2006 by Rikin Gandhi and his colleagues. It later branched out as an independent NGO in 2008.

Digital Green works across seven states in India, parts of Ethiopia, Ghana and Afghanistan. The organization engages over 150,000 farmers (over 70% women) in more than 2,000 villages. It received an Rs 3 crore Global Impact Award from Google in 2013, and Manthan award in 2012. Rikin Gandhi, the chief executive officer of Digital Green, was awarded IFA Norman Borlaug Award by the International Fertilizer Industry Association in 2012.

== Loop ==
With time, it was found that smallholder farmers in rural India spend anywhere from a half to a full day selling their produce at the nearest market while also incurring transport costs. To reduce costs, Digital Green created Loop, a mobile app based intervention that improves farmers’ access to markets by helping them to aggregate their perishable produce through a local village level entrepreneur trained to use the app and aggregate - himself a farmer.

Digital Green nurtures these village-level entrepreneurs to recruit farmers, assess daily produce volumes, determine which nearby market offers the best price, arrange transport based on volume, and sell farmers’ produce directly to wholesale buyers. They record volumes and sales on the Loop mobile app, which sends receipts to farmers via text messages. After completing transactions on behalf of all farmers, the entrepreneurs return to the villages to deliver same-day payment and earn their commission.

== Wonder Village and Farmer Book ==
Digital Green has developed two social online games, Wonder Village and Farmer Book. Through these games, players set up a simulated village economy and have opportunities to relate with the actual farmers that the organization works with in the field. Players are placed in a resource-constrained setting and pursue quests like setting up small farms of paddy and maize and supplying raw materials to farmers' markets. The game follows a freemium model which allows users to play for free with the option of purchasing virtual currency to advance more quickly. Deniss Berezins composed the music for Wonder Village.

== Events and workshops ==
- Farmer Funda, Mumbai – Jun 1 11:00am
- India-U.S. Tech Summit 2014 at the India Expo Mart, Greater Noida, Nov 18–19
- Participatory Stakeholders Workshop – Puri, Odisha
- TOT (Training of the trainers), Hyderabad – July 7–9, 2015
