= Precision livestock farming =

Automated tools and methods for livestock management

Precision livestock farming (PLF) is a set of electronic tools and methods used for the management of livestock. PLF involves automated monitoring of animals to improve their production, reproduction, health, welfare, and impact on the environment. PLF tracks large animals, such as cows, "per animal", but smaller animals, such as poultry, "per flock", wherein the whole flock in a house is treated as one animal. Tracking "per flock" is widely used in broilers.

PLF technologies include cameras, microphones, and other sensors for tracking livestock, as well as accompanying computer software. The data recorded can be either quantitative or qualitative, and/or address sustainability.

== Goals ==
PLF involves the monitoring of animals, or the use of measurements on the animals, using signal analysis algorithms and statistical analysis. These techniques are applied in part with the goal of regaining an advantage of older, smaller-scale farming, namely detailed knowledge of individual animals. Before large farms became the norm, most farmers had an intimate knowledge of their livestock. Moreover, a farmer could typically trace an animal's pedigree and retain other important characteristics. Each animal was approached as an individual. Since then farms have multiplied in scale, with highly automated processes for feeding and other tasks. Consequently, farmers are forced to work with many more animals to make their living out of livestock farming and work with average values per group. Variety has become an impediment to increasing economies of scale.

Using information technology, farmers can record the attributes of each animal, such as pedigree, age, reproduction, growth, health, feed conversion, killing out percentage (carcass weight as a percentage of its live weight) and meat quality. Animal welfare, infection, aggression, weight, feed and water intake are variables that can be monitored by PLF. Culling can be done on the basis of reproduction values, in addition to killing out percentage, meat quality, and health. The result of incorporating this technology into large-scale farming is a potentially significantly higher reproduction outcome, with each newborn also potentially contributing to a higher meat value.

=== Ecological livestock farming ===
Selecting the "right" ingredients can have a positive effect on the environment pollution. It has been shown that optimizing the feed this can reduce nitrogen and phosphorus found in the excrement of pigs.

== Examples in different industries ==
=== Dairy Industry ===
==== Robotic milkers ====
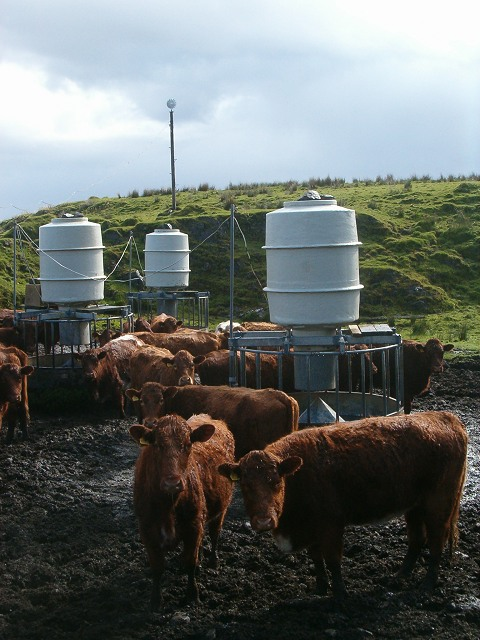
Automatic cattle feeder

In automatic milking, a robotic milker can be used for precision management of dairy cattle. The main advantages are time savings, greater production, a record of valuable information, and diversion of abnormal milk.

==== Automatic feeders ====
An automatic feeder is a tool used to provide feed to cattle. It is composed of a robot (either on a rail system or self-propelled) that will feed the cattle at designated times. The robot mixes the feed ration and will deliver a programmed amount.

==== Activity collars ====
Activity collars gather biometric data from animals. Some wearable devices help farmers with estrous detection, as well as other adverse health events or conditions.

==== Inline milk sensors ====
Inline milk sensors help farmers identify variation of components in the milk. Some sensors are relatively simple technologies that measure properties such as electrical conductivity, and others use automated sampling and reagents to provide a different measure to inform management decisions.

=== Meat industry ===
==== EID / RFID / Electronic Identification / Electronic Ear Tags ====
Radio Frequency IDentification (commonly known as RFID or EID) is applied in cattle, pigs, sheep, goats, deer and other types of livestock for individual identification. There is currently a growing trend of RFID or EID becoming mandatory for certain species. For example, Australia has made EID compulsory for cattle, as has New Zealand for deer, and the European Union for sheep and goats. EID makes identification of individual animals much less error-prone. RFID enhances traceability, but it also provides other benefits such as reproduction tracking (pedigree, progeny, and productivity), automatic weighing, and drafting.

==== Smart ear tags ====
Smart cattle ear tags constantly gather behavioural and biometric data from cattle, allowing managers to see the exact animals that need more attention regarding their health. Smart ear tagging has been shown to be effective in identifying illness earlier and more accurately than traditional visual monitoring.

=== Swine Industry ===
==== Automated Weight Detection Cameras ====
Automated weight detection cameras can be used to calculate the pig's weight without a scale. These cameras can have an accuracy of less than 1.5 kilograms.

==== Microphones to detect respiratory problems ====
In the swine industry, the presence of respiratory problems must be closely monitored. There are multiple pathogens that can cause infection; enzootic pneumonia is one of the most common respiratory diseases in pigs caused by Mycoplasma hyopneumoniae and other bacteria.

=== Climate control ===
Thermal stress is connected to reduced performance, illness, and mortality. Depending on geographical location, and the types of animals will require different heating or ventilation systems. Broilers, laying hens, and piglets like to be kept warm.

==== Poultry industry ====
In the poultry industry, unfavourable climate conditions increase the chances of behavioural, respiratory, and digestive disorders in the birds.

== Quantitative Methods, towards scientifically based management of livestock farming ==
The development of quantitative methods for livestock production includes mathematical modelling based in plant-herbivore or predator-prey models to forecast and optimise meat production. An example is the Predator-Prey Grassland Livestock Model (PPGL) to address the dynamics of the combined grass-animals system as a predator-prey dynamical system. This PPGL model has been used to simulate the effect of forage deficiency on the farm's economic performance.
