= Yield mapping =

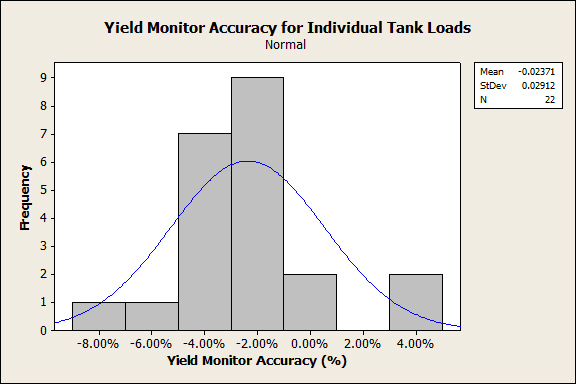
- HistogramYieldMonitorPassToPassAccuracy

Yield mapping or yield monitoring is a technique in agriculture of using GPS data to analyze variables such as crop yield and moisture content in a given field. It was developed in the 1990s and uses a combination of GPS technology and physical sensors, such as speedometers, to track crop yields, grain elevator speed, and combine speed.

This data produces a yield map that can be used to compare yield distribution within the field from year to year. This allows farmers to determine areas of the field that, for example, may need to be more heavily irrigated or are not yielding any crop at all. It also allows farmers to show the effects of a change in field-management techniques, to develop nutrient strategies for their fields, and as a record of crop yield to use in securing loans or renters.
