= Variable rate application =

Precise use of a material in agriculture

In precision agriculture, variable rate application (VRA) refers to the application of a material, such that the rate of application is based on the precise location, or qualities of the area that the material is being applied to. This is different from uniform application, and can be used to save money (using less product), and lessen the environmental impact.

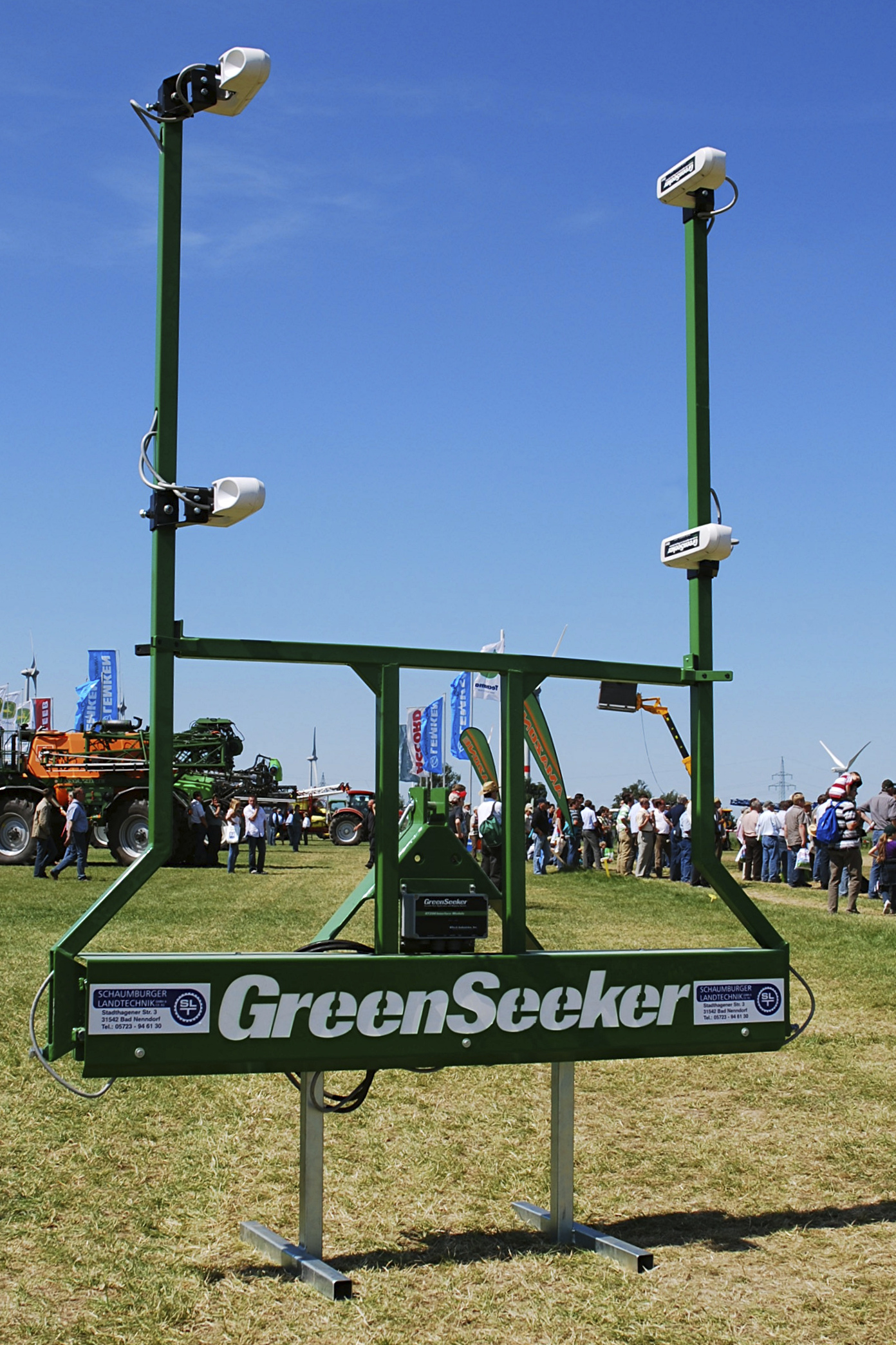
GreenSeeker RT200 (Variable Rate Application and Mapping System)

Variable rate application can be either map based or sensor based.

- Map based VRA is pre-planned, and applications are based on VRA prescription maps that an agronomist or advisor prepares based on data sources. Prescription maps can be created using electromagnetic induction, which is considered to be cost-effective, and non-destructive.
- Sensor based VRA is calculated realtime, based on sensors that are local to the variable rate applicator.

== Applications of VRA ==
In precision agriculture, VRA is known to be used in the following areas.

=== Seeding ===
Planters and drills can be made into VRA sensors, by attaching a motor or gear box. With this, you can vary the rate of the seeds. The seeding rates can also be connected to match the application of agrochemicals.

=== Weed control ===
For variable rate weed control you need both a task computer and a system to physically change the flow rate of the agrochemicals.

=== Fertilizer ===
Crops do not always require a uniform application, as some areas will have different nutrient requirements due to their location (soil properties, sunlight). Variable rate fertilizer spreaders can be used to increase or decrease fertilizer application rate, using a global positioning system (GPS). They can also use "on-the-go" sensors, or a combination of the two.

=== Identification of crop stress ===
VRA technologies can assist the farmers to identify zones on a field that has low vigor and achieve an understanding of them by using vegetation indices (e.g., NDVI) combined with field data such as elevation and soil characteristics. For instance, judging by the stress in soybean fields, farmers seemed to have targeted input allocation, withholding fertilizer application in low-potential zones and incurring costs only in high-yield areas.
