= List of Streptomyces species =

The following is a list of Streptomyces species, organized alphabetically by species name. Names that have not been validated according to the Bacteriological Code are enclosed in "quotes".

As of June 2021, there are 679 valid species of Streptomyces and an additional 121 provisional species. New species continue to be discovered (e.g., S. gossypiisoli, described in 2021). Many species are named after their colorful hyphae and/or spores.

== A ==
- Streptomyces abietis Fujii et al. 2013
- Streptomyces abikoensis (Umezawa et al. 1951) Witt and Stackebrandt 1991
- Streptomyces abyssalis Xu et al. 2012
- "Streptomyces abyssomicinicus" Komaki et al. 2020
- Streptomyces achromogenes Okami and Umezawa 1953 (Approved Lists 1980)
- Streptomyces acidicola Lipun et al. 2020
- Streptomyces acidiscabies Lambert and Loria 1989
- Streptomyces actinomycinicus Tanasupawat et al. 2016
- "Streptomyces actuosus" Pinnert et al.
- Streptomyces aculeolatus Shomura et al. 1988
- "Streptomyces adephospholyticus" Murao and Nishino 1973
- Streptomyces adustus Lee and Whang 2016
- "Streptomyces aegyptia" El-Naggar et al. 2011
- Streptomyces afghaniensis Shimo et al. 1959 (Approved Lists 1980)
- Streptomyces africanus Meyers et al. 2004
- Streptomyces aidingensis Xia et al. 2013
- "Streptomyces aizunensis" Miyamura et al. 1973
- Streptomyces alanosinicus Thiemann and Beretta 1966 (Approved Lists 1980)
- Streptomyces albaduncus Tsukiura et al. 1964 (Approved Lists 1980)
- Streptomyces albiaxialis Kuznetsov et al. 1993
- "Streptomyces albicerus" Sun et al. 2020
- Streptomyces albidochromogenes Preobrazhenskaya 1986
- Streptomyces albidoflavus (Rossi Doria 1891) Waksman and Henrici 1948 (Approved Lists 1980)
- "Streptomyces albidus" Kaewkla and Franco 2021
- Streptomyces albiflavescens Han et al. 2015
- Streptomyces albiflaviniger Goodfellow et al. 2008
- Streptomyces albofaciens Thirumalachar and Bhatt 1960 (Approved Lists 1980)
- Streptomyces alboflavus (Waksman and Curtis 1916) Waksman and Henrici 1948 (Approved Lists 1980)
- Streptomyces albogriseolus Benedict et al. 1954 (Approved Lists 1980)
- Streptomyces alboniger Porter et al. 1952 (Approved Lists 1980)
- Streptomyces albospinus Wang et al. 1966 (Approved Lists 1980)
- Streptomyces albulus Routien 1969 (Approved Lists 1980)
- Streptomyces albus (Rossi Doria 1891) Waksman and Henrici 1943 (Approved Lists 1980)
- Streptomyces aldersoniae Kumar and Goodfellow 2010
- Streptomyces alfalfae She et al. 2016
- Streptomyces alkaliphilus Akhwale et al. 2015
- Streptomyces alkaliterrae Świecimska et al. 2021
- Streptomyces alkalithermotolerans Sultanpuram et al. 2015
- Streptomyces alni Liu et al. 2009
- Streptomyces althioticus Yamaguchi et al. 1957 (Approved Lists 1980)
- Streptomyces altiplanensis Cortés-Albayay et al. 2019
- Streptomyces amakusaensis Nagatsu et al. 1963 (Approved Lists 1980)
- Streptomyces ambofaciens Pinnert-Sindico 1954 (Approved Lists 1980)
- Streptomyces amphotericinicus Cao et al. 2017
- Streptomyces amritsarensis Sharma et al. 2014
- Streptomyces anandii Batra and Bajaj 1965 (Approved Lists 1980)
- Streptomyces andamanensis Sripreechasak et al. 2016
- Streptomyces angustmyceticus (Yüntsen et al. 1956) Kumar and Goodfellow 2010
- Streptomyces anthocyanicus (Krassilnikov et al. 1965) Pridham 1970 (Approved Lists 1980)
- Streptomyces antibioticus (Waksman and Woodruff 1941) Waksman and Henrici 1948 (Approved Lists 1980)
- "Streptomyces antioxidans" Ser et al. 2016
- Streptomyces anulatus (Beijerinck 1912) Waksman 1953 (Approved Lists 1980)
- Streptomyces apocyni Liu et al. 2020
- Streptomyces aqsuensis Wang et al. 2018
- Streptomyces aquilus Li et al. 2020
- Streptomyces araujoniae Da Silva et al. 2014
- Streptomyces arboris Liu et al. 2020
- Streptomyces arcticus Zhang et al. 2016
- Streptomyces ardesiacus (Baldacci et al. 1955) Komaki and Tamura 2020
- Streptomyces ardus (De Boer et al. 1961) Witt and Stackebrandt 1991
- Streptomyces arenae Pridham et al. 1958 (Approved Lists 1980)
- Streptomyces aridus Idris et al. 2017
- Streptomyces armeniacus (Kalakoutskii and Kusnetsov 1964) Wellington and Williams 1981
- Streptomyces artemisiae Zhao et al. 2010
- Streptomyces ascomycinicus Kumar and Goodfellow 2010
- Streptomyces asenjonii Goodfellow et al. 2017
- Streptomyces asiaticus Sembiring et al. 2001
- Streptomyces asterosporus (ex Krassilnikov 1970) Preobrazhenskaya 1986
- Streptomyces atacamensis Santhanam et al. 2012
- "Streptomyces atlanticus" Silva et al. 2016
- Streptomyces atratus Shibata et al. 1962 (Approved Lists 1980)
- Streptomyces atriruber Labeda et al. 2009
- Streptomyces atroolivaceus (Preobrazhenskaya et al. 1957) Pridham et al. 1958 (Approved Lists 1980)
- Streptomyces atrovirens (ex Preobrazhenskaya et al. 1971) Preobrazhenskaya and Terekhova 1986
- Streptomyces aurantiacus (Rossi Doria 1891) Waksman 1953 (Approved Lists 1980)
- "Streptomyces auranticolor" Ikushima et al. 1980
- Streptomyces aurantiogriseus (Preobrazhenskaya 1957) Pridham et al. 1958 (Approved Lists 1980)
- Streptomyces auratus Goodfellow et al. 2008
- Streptomyces aureocirculatus (Krassilnikov and Yuan 1965) Pridham 1970 (Approved Lists 1980)
- Streptomyces aureorectus (ex Taig et al. 1969) Taig and Solovieva 1986
- Streptomyces aureoverticillatus (Krassilnikov and Yuan 1960) Pridham 1970 (Approved Lists 1980)
- Streptomyces aureus Manfio et al. 2003
- Streptomyces avermitilis (ex Burg et al. 1979) Kim and Goodfellow 2002
- Streptomyces avicenniae Xiao et al. 2009
- Streptomyces avidinii Stapley et al. 1964 (Approved Lists 1980)
- Streptomyces axinellae Pimentel-Elardo et al. 2009
- Streptomyces azureus Kelly et al. 1959 (Approved Lists 1980)

== B ==
- Streptomyces bacillaris (Krassilnikov 1958) Pridham 1970 (Approved Lists 1980)
- Streptomyces badius (Kudrina 1957) Pridham et al. 1958 (Approved Lists 1980)
- Streptomyces baliensis Otoguro et al. 2009
- Streptomyces bambusae Nguyen and Kim 2016
- Streptomyces bangladeshensis Al-Bari et al. 2005
- Streptomyces barkulensis Ray et al. 2014
- "Streptomyces bathyalis" Risdian et al. 2021
- Streptomyces bauhiniae Kanchanasin et al. 2020
- Streptomyces beijiangensis Li et al. 2002
- Streptomyces bellus Margalith and Beretta 1960 (Approved Lists 1980)
- Streptomyces bikiniensis Johnstone and Waksman 1947 (Approved Lists 1980)
- "Streptomyces bingchenggensis" Gao et al. 2007
- Streptomyces blastmyceticus (Watanabe et al. 1957) Witt and Stackebrandt 1991
- Streptomyces bluensis Mason et al. 1963 (Approved Lists 1980)
- Streptomyces bobili (Waksman and Curtis 1916) Waksman and Henrici 1948 (Approved Lists 1980)
- Streptomyces bohaiensis Pan et al. 2015
- Streptomyces boluensis Tokatli et al. 2021
- Streptomyces boncukensis Tatar et al. 2021
- Streptomyces boninensis Také et al. 2018
- Streptomyces bottropensis Waksman 1961 (Approved Lists 1980)
- Streptomyces brasiliensis (Falcão de Morais et al. 1966) Goodfellow et al. 1986
- Streptomyces brevispora Zucchi et al. 2012
- "Streptomyces brollosae" El-Naggar and Moawad 2015
- Streptomyces broussonetiae Mo et al. 2020
- Streptomyces bryophytorum Li et al. 2016
- "Streptomyces buecherae" Hamm et al. 2020
- Streptomyces bullii Santhanam et al. 2013
- Streptomyces bungoensis Eguchi et al. 1993
- Streptomyces burgazadensis Saricaoglu et al. 2014

== C ==
- "Streptomyces caatingaensis" Santos et al. 2015
- Streptomyces cacaoi (Waksman 1932) Waksman and Henrici 1948 (Approved Lists 1980)
- Streptomyces cadmiisoli Li et al. 2019
- Streptomyces caelestis De Boer et al. 1955 (Approved Lists 1980)
- Streptomyces caeni Huang et al. 2018
- Streptomyces caeruleatus Zhu et al. 2011
- "Streptomyces caespitosus" Sugawara and Hata 1956
- Streptomyces cahuitamycinicus Saygin et al. 2020
- Streptomyces caldifontis Amin et al. 2017
- Streptomyces calidiresistens Duan et al. 2014
- Streptomyces calvus Backus et al. 1957 (Approved Lists 1980)
- "Streptomyces cameroonensis" Boudjeko et al. 2017
- "Streptomyces camponoti" Piao et al. 2017
- Streptomyces camponoticapitis Li et al. 2016
- Streptomyces canalis Xie et al. 2016
- Streptomyces canarius Vavra and Dietz 1965 (Approved Lists 1980)
- Streptomyces candidus (ex Krassilnikov 1941) Sveshnikova 1986
- Streptomyces cangkringensis Sembiring et al. 2001
- Streptomyces caniferus (ex Krassilnikov 1970) Preobrazhenskaya 1986
- Streptomyces canus Heinemann et al. 1953 (Approved Lists 1980)
- Streptomyces capillispiralis Mertz and Higgens 1982
- Streptomyces capitiformicae Jiang et al. 2018
- Streptomyces capoamus Gonçalves de Lima et al. 1964 (Approved Lists 1980)
- Streptomyces capparidis Wang et al. 2017
- "Streptomyces carminius" Wang et al. 2018
- Streptomyces carpaticus Maximova and Terekhova 1986
- Streptomyces carpinensis (Falcão de Morais et al. 1971) Goodfellow et al. 1986
- "Streptomyces castaneus" Zhou et al. 2017
- Streptomyces castelarensis (Cercós 1954) Kumar and Goodfellow 2008
- Streptomyces catenulae Davisson and Finlay 1961 (Approved Lists 1980)
- "Streptomyces cattleya" Noble et al. 1978
- Streptomyces cavernae Fang et al. 2020
- Streptomyces cavourensis Skarbek and Brady 1978 (Approved Lists 1980)
- Streptomyces cellostaticus Hamada 1958 (Approved Lists 1980)
- Streptomyces celluloflavus Nishimura et al. 1953 (Approved Lists 1980)
- Streptomyces cellulolyticus Li 1997
- Streptomyces cellulosae (Krainsky 1914) Waksman and Henrici 1948 (Approved Lists 1980)
- Streptomyces cerasinus Kanchanasin et al. 2017
- "Streptomyces cerradoensis" da Silva Sobrinho et al. 2005
- "Streptomyces cervinus" Ōmura et al. 1982
- Streptomyces chartreusis Leach et al. 1953 (Approved Lists 1980)
- Streptomyces chattanoogensis Burns and Holtman 1959 (Approved Lists 1980)
- Streptomyces cheonanensis Kim et al. 2006
- Streptomyces chiangmaiensis Promnuan et al. 2013
- Streptomyces chilikensis Ray et al. 2013
- Streptomyces chitinivorans Ray et al. 2016
- Streptomyces chlorus Kim et al. 2013
- Streptomyces chrestomyceticus Canevazzi and Scotti 1959 (Approved Lists 1980)
- Streptomyces chromofuscus (Preobrazhenskaya et al. 1957) Pridham et al. 1958 (Approved Lists 1980)
- Streptomyces chryseus (Krassilnikov et al. 1965) Pridham 1970 (Approved Lists 1980)
- Streptomyces chumphonensis Phongsopitanun et al. 2014
- Streptomyces cinereoruber Corbaz et al. 1957 (Approved Lists 1980)
- Streptomyces cinereospinus Terekhova et al. 1986
- Streptomyces cinereus (Cross et al. 1963) Goodfellow et al. 1986
- Streptomyces cinerochromogenes Miyairi et al. 1966 (Approved Lists 1980)
- Streptomyces cinnabarigriseus Landwehr et al. 2018
- Streptomyces cinnabarinus (Ryabova and Preobrazhenskaya 1957) Pridham et al. 1958 (Approved Lists 1980)
- Streptomyces cinnamoneus (Benedict et al. 1952) Witt and Stackebrandt 1991
- Streptomyces cirratus Koshiyama et al. 1963 (Approved Lists 1980)
- "Streptomyces citricolor" Kusaka et al. 1968
- Streptomyces clavifer (Millard and Burr 1926) Waksman 1953 (Approved Lists 1980)
- Streptomyces clavuligerus Higgens and Kastner 1971 (Approved Lists 1980)
- Streptomyces coacervatus Shibazaki et al. 2011
- Streptomyces cocklensis Kim et al. 2012
- Streptomyces coelescens (Krassilnikov et al. 1965) Pridham 1970 (Approved Lists 1980)
- Streptomyces coelicoflavus (ex Ryabova and Preobrazhenskaya 1957) Terekhova 1986
- "Streptomyces coeruleoaurantiacus" Gauze et al. 1982
- Streptomyces coeruleoflavus (ex Ryabova and Preobrazhenskaya 1957) Preobrazhenskaya and Maximova 1986
- Streptomyces coeruleofuscus (Preobrazhenskaya 1957) Pridham et al. 1958 (Approved Lists 1980)
- Streptomyces coeruleoprunus Preobrazhenskaya 1986
- Streptomyces coeruleorubidus (Preobrazhenskaya 1957) Pridham et al. 1958 (Approved Lists 1980)
- Streptomyces coerulescens (Preobrazhenskaya 1957) Pridham et al. 1958 (Approved Lists 1980)
- Streptomyces collinus Lindenbein 1952 (Approved Lists 1980)
- "Streptomyces colonosanans" Law et al. 2017
- "Streptomyces conglobatus" Liu et al. 1978
- Streptomyces corchorusii Ahmad and Bhuiyan 1958 (Approved Lists 1980)
- Streptomyces coryli Saygin et al. 2020
- "Streptomyces corynorhini" Hamm et al. 2019
- Streptomyces cremeus (Kudrina 1957) Pridham et al. 1958 (Approved Lists 1980)
- Streptomyces crystallinus Tresner et al. 1961 (Approved Lists 1980)
- "Streptomyces cupreus" Maiti and Mandal 2021
- Streptomyces curacoi Cataldi 1963 (Approved Lists 1980)
- Streptomyces cuspidosporus Higashide et al. 1966 (Approved Lists 1980)
- "Streptomyces cuticulae" Piao et al. 2017
- Streptomyces cyaneochromogenes Tang et al. 2019
- Streptomyces cyaneofuscatus (Kudrina 1957) Pridham et al. 1958 (Approved Lists 1980)
- Streptomyces cyaneus (Krassilnikov 1941) Waksman 1953 (Approved Lists 1980)
- Streptomyces cyslabdanicus Také et al. 2015

== D ==
- Streptomyces daghestanicus (Sveshnikova 1957) Pridham et al. 1958 (Approved Lists 1980)
- Streptomyces daliensis Xu et al. 2012
- Streptomyces dangxiongensis Zhang et al. 2019
- Streptomyces daqingensis Pan et al. 2016
- Streptomyces davaonensis Landwehr et al. 2018
- Streptomyces deccanensis Dastager et al. 2008
- Streptomyces decoyicus (Vavra et al. 1959) Kumar and Goodfellow 2010
- Streptomyces demainii Goodfellow et al. 2008
- "Streptomyces dendra" Selvin 2009
- Streptomyces dengpaensis Li et al. 2018
- Streptomyces desertarenae Li et al. 2019
- Streptomyces deserti Santhanam et al. 2013
- Streptomyces diacarni Li et al. 2019
- Streptomyces diastaticus (Krainsky 1914) Waksman and Henrici 1948 (Approved Lists 1980)
- Streptomyces diastatochromogenes (Krainsky 1914) Waksman and Henrici 1948 (Approved Lists 1980)
- "Streptomyces dimorphogenes" Yokose et al. 1983
- "Streptomyces dioscori" Wang et al. 2018
- Streptomyces djakartensis Huber et al. 1962 (Approved Lists 1980)
- Streptomyces drozdowiczii Semêdo et al. 2004
- Streptomyces durbertensis Yu et al. 2018
- Streptomyces durhamensis Gordon and Lapa 1966 (Approved Lists 1980)
- Streptomyces durmitorensis Savic et al. 2007
- Streptomyces dysideae Glaeser et al. 2021

== E ==
- Streptomyces echinatus Corbaz et al. 1957 (Approved Lists 1980)
- Streptomyces echinoruber Palleroni et al. 1981
- Streptomyces endophyticus Li et al. 2013
- Streptomyces erringtonii Santhanam et al. 2013
- "Streptomyces erythrochromogenes" Abdallah et al. 1982
- Streptomyces erythrogriseus Falcão de Morais and Dália Maia 1959 (Approved Lists 1980)
- Streptomyces eurocidicus (Okami et al. 1954) Witt and Stackebrandt 1991
- Streptomyces europaeiscabiei Bouchek-Mechiche et al. 2000
- Streptomyces eurythermus Corbaz et al. 1957 (Approved Lists 1980)
- Streptomyces exfoliatus (Waksman and Curtis 1916) Waksman and Henrici 1948 (Approved Lists 1980)

== F ==
- Streptomyces fabae Nguyen and Kim 2015
- Streptomyces fagopyri Guo et al. 2020
- Streptomyces fenghuangensis Zhu et al. 2011
- Streptomyces ferralitis Saintpierre-Bonaccio et al. 2004
- "Streptomyces ferrugineus" Ruan et al. 2015
- "Streptomyces ficellus" Argoudelis et al. 1976
- Streptomyces filamentosus Okami and Umezawa 1953 (Approved Lists 1980)
- Streptomyces fildesensis Li et al. 2012
- Streptomyces filipinensis Ammann et al. 1955 (Approved Lists 1980)
- Streptomyces fimbriatus (Millard and Burr 1926) Waksman and Lechevalier 1953 (Approved Lists 1980)
- Streptomyces finlayi (Szabó et al. 1963) Pridham 1970 (Approved Lists 1980)
- "Streptomyces flavalbus" Cao et al. 2018
- Streptomyces flaveolus (Waksman 1923) Waksman and Henrici 1948 (Approved Lists 1980)
- Streptomyces flaveus (Cross et al. 1963) Goodfellow et al. 1986
- Streptomyces flavidovirens (Kudrina 1957) Pridham et al. 1958 (Approved Lists 1980)
- "Streptomyces flavochromogenes" (Krainsky 1914) Waksman and Henrici 1948
- Streptomyces flavofungini (ex Úri and Békési 1958) Szabó and Preobrazhenskaya 1986
- Streptomyces flavotricini (Preobrazhenskaya and Sveshnikova 1957) Pridham et al. 1958 (Approved Lists 1980)
- Streptomyces flavovariabilis (ex Korenyako and Nikitina 1965) Sveshnikova 1986
- Streptomyces flavovirens (Waksman 1923) Waksman and Henrici 1948 (Approved Lists 1980)
- Streptomyces flavoviridis (ex Preobrazhenskaya et al. 1957) Preobrazhenskaya 1986
- Streptomyces fodineus Kim et al. 2019
- Streptomyces formicae Bai et al. 2016
- Streptomyces fractus Rohland and Meyers 2016
- Streptomyces fradiae (Waksman and Curtis 1916) Waksman and Henrici 1948 (Approved Lists 1980)
- Streptomyces fragilis Anderson et al. 1956 (Approved Lists 1980)
- Streptomyces fukangensis Zhang et al. 2014
- Streptomyces fulvorobeus Vinogradova and Preobrazhenskaya 1986
- Streptomyces fumanus (Sveshnikova 1957) Pridham et al. 1958 (Approved Lists 1980)
- Streptomyces fumigatiscleroticus (ex Pridham 1970) Goodfellow et al. 1986
- Streptomyces fuscichromogenes Zhang et al. 2017
- Streptomyces fuscigenes Lee and Whang 2018

== G ==
- Streptomyces galbus Frommer 1959 (Approved Lists 1980)
- Streptomyces gamaensis Zhao et al. 2017
- Streptomyces gancidicus Suzuki 1957
- "Streptomyces gandocaensis" Park et al. 2016
- Streptomyces gardneri (Waksman 1942) Waksman 1961 (Approved Lists 1980)
- Streptomyces gelaticus (Waksman 1923) Waksman and Henrici 1948 (Approved Lists 1980)
- Streptomyces geldanamycininus Goodfellow et al. 2008
- Streptomyces geranii Li et al. 2018
- Streptomyces geysiriensis Wallhäusser et al. 1966 (Approved Lists 1980)
- Streptomyces gilvifuscus Nguyen and Kim 2015
- "Streptomyces gilvigriseus" Ser et al. 2015
- "Streptomyces gilvospiralis" Karwowski et al. 1984
- "Streptomyces ginkgonis" Yan et al. 2018
- Streptomyces glaucescens (Preobrazhenskaya 1957) Pridham et al. 1958 (Approved Lists 1980)
- Streptomyces glauciniger Huang et al. 2004
- Streptomyces glaucosporus (ex Krassilnikov et al. 1968) Agre 1986
- Streptomyces glaucus (ex Lehmann and Schutze 1912) Agre and Preobrazhenskaya 1986
- "Streptomyces glebosus" (Ohmori et al. 1962) Rong and Huang 2012
- Streptomyces globisporus (Krassilnikov 1941) Waksman 1953 (Approved Lists 1980)
- Streptomyces globosus (Krassilnikov 1941) Waksman 1953 (Approved Lists 1980)
- Streptomyces glomeratus (ex Gauze and Sveshnikova 1978) Gauze and Preobrazhenskaya 1986
- Streptomyces glomeroaurantiacus (Krassilnikov and Yuan 1965) Pridham 1970 (Approved Lists 1980)
- Streptomyces glycovorans Xu et al. 2012
- Streptomyces gobitricini (Preobrazhenskaya and Sveshnikova 1957) Pridham et al. 1958 (Approved Lists 1980)
- Streptomyces goshikiensis Niida 1966 (Approved Lists 1980)
- Streptomyces gossypiisoli Zhang et al. 2021
- Streptomyces graminearus Preobrazhenskaya 1986
- Streptomyces gramineus Lee et al. 2012
- Streptomyces graminifolii Lee and Whang 2014
- Streptomyces graminilatus Lee and Whang 2014
- Streptomyces graminisoli Lee and Whang 2014
- Streptomyces griseiniger Goodfellow et al. 2008
- Streptomyces griseoaurantiacus (Krassilnikov and Yuan 1965) Pridham 1970 (Approved Lists 1980)
- Streptomyces griseocarneus (Benedict et al. 1950) Witt and Stackebrandt 1991
- Streptomyces griseochromogenes Fukunaga 1955 (Approved Lists 1980)
- Streptomyces griseoflavus (Krainsky 1914) Waksman and Henrici 1948 (Approved Lists 1980)
- Streptomyces griseofuscus Sakamoto et al. 1962 (Approved Lists 1980)
- Streptomyces griseoincarnatus (Preobrazhenskaya et al. 1957) Pridham et al. 1958 (Approved Lists 1980)
- Streptomyces griseoloalbus (Kudrina 1957) Pridham et al. 1958 (Approved Lists 1980)
- Streptomyces griseoluteus Umezawa et al. 1950 (Approved Lists 1980)
- Streptomyces griseomycini (Preobrazhenskaya et al. 1957) Pridham et al. 1958 (Approved Lists 1980)
- Streptomyces griseorubens (Preobrazhenskaya et al. 1957) Pridham et al. 1958 (Approved Lists 1980)
- Streptomyces griseoruber Yamaguchi and Saburi 1955 (Approved Lists 1980)
- Streptomyces griseorubiginosus (Ryabova and Preobrazhenskaya 1957) Pridham et al. 1958 (Approved Lists 1980)
- Streptomyces griseosporeus Niida and Ogasawara 1960 (Approved Lists 1980)
- Streptomyces griseostramineus (Preobrazhenskaya et al. 1957) Pridham et al. 1958 (Approved Lists 1980)
- Streptomyces griseoviridis Anderson et al. 1956 (Approved Lists 1980)
- Streptomyces griseus (Krainsky 1914) Waksman and Henrici 1948 (Approved Lists 1980)
- Streptomyces guanduensis Xu et al. 2006
- Streptomyces gulbargensis Dastager et al. 2009

== H ==
- Streptomyces hainanensis Jiang et al. 2007
- Streptomyces haliclonae Khan et al. 2010
- Streptomyces halophytocola Qin et al. 2013
- Streptomyces halstedii (Waksman and Curtis 1916) Waksman and Henrici 1948 (Approved Lists 1980)
- Streptomyces harbinensis Liu et al. 2013
- Streptomyces harenosi Kusuma et al. 2020
- Streptomyces hawaiiensis Cron eet al. 1956 (Approved Lists 1980)
- Streptomyces hebeiensis Xu et al. 2004
- Streptomyces heilongjiangensis Liu et al. 2013
- Streptomyces heliomycini (ex Braznikova et al. 1958) Preobrazhenskaya 1986
- Streptomyces helvaticus (Krassilnikov et al. 1965) Pridham 1970 (Approved Lists 1980)
- "Streptomyces helvoloviolaceus" Malkina et al. 1996
- Streptomyces herbaceus Kim et al. 2012
- "Streptomyces himalayensis" Maiti and Mandal 2021
- Streptomyces himastatinicus Kumar and Goodfellow 2008
- Streptomyces hiroshimensis (Shinobu 1955) Witt and Stackebrandt 1991
- Streptomyces hirsutus Ettlinger et al. 1958 (Approved Lists 1980)
- Streptomyces hokutonensis Yamamura et al. 2014
- Streptomyces hoynatensis Veyisoglu and Sahin 2014
- Streptomyces huasconensis Cortés-Albayay et al. 2019
- "Streptomyces humi" Zainal et al. 2016
- Streptomyces humidus Nakazawa and Shibata 1956 (Approved Lists 1980)
- Streptomyces hundungensis Nimaichand et al. 2013
- Streptomyces hyaluromycini Harunari et al. 2016
- Streptomyces hyderabadensis Reddy et al. 2011
- Streptomyces hydrogenans Lindner et al. 1958 (Approved Lists 1980)
- Streptomyces hygroscopicus (Jensen 1931) Yüntsen et al. 1956 (Approved Lists 1980)
- Streptomyces hypolithicus Le Roes-Hill et al. 2009

== I ==
- Streptomyces iakyrus de Querioz and Albert 1962 (Approved Lists 1980)
- Streptomyces iconiensis Tatar et al. 2014
- "Streptomyces idiomorphus" Takizawa et al. 1987
- Streptomyces incanus Kim et al. 2012
- Streptomyces indiaensis (Gupta 1965) Kudo and Seino 1987
- Streptomyces indicus Luo et al. 2011
- Streptomyces indoligenes Luo et al. 2016
- Streptomyces indonesiensis Sembiring et al. 2001
- Streptomyces inhibens Jin et al. 2019
- Streptomyces intermedius (Krüger 1904) Waksman 1953 (Approved Lists 1980)
- Streptomyces inusitatus Hasegawa et al. 1978 (Approved Lists 1980)
- Streptomyces ipomoeae (Person and Martin 1940) Waksman and Henrici 1948 (Approved Lists 1980)
- Streptomyces iranensis Hamedi et al. 2010

== J ==
- Streptomyces janthinus (Artamonova and Krassilnikov 1960) Pridham 1970 (Approved Lists 1980)
- Streptomyces javensis Sembiring et al. 2001
- Streptomyces jeddahensis Röttig et al. 2017
- Streptomyces jietaisiensis He et al. 2005
- Streptomyces jiujiangensis Zhang et al. 2014

== K ==
- Streptomyces kaempferi Santhanam et al. 2013
- Streptomyces kalpinensis Ma et al. 2017
- Streptomyces kanamyceticus Okami and Umezawa 1957 (Approved Lists 1980)
- "Streptomyces kanasensis" Han et al. 2015
- Streptomyces karpasiensis Veyisoglu et al. 2014
- Streptomyces kasugaensis Hamada et al. 1995
- Streptomyces katrae Gupta and Chopra 1963 (Approved Lists 1980)
- "Streptomyces kavutarensis" Ellaiah et al. 2004
- Streptomyces kebangsaanensis Sarmin et al. 2013
- Streptomyces klenkii Veyisoglu and Sahin 2015
- Streptomyces koyangensis Lee et al. 2005
- Streptomyces kronopolitis Liu et al. 2016
- Streptomyces krungchingensis Sripreechasak et al. 2017
- Streptomyces kunmingensis (Ruan et al. 1985) Goodfellow et al. 1986
- Streptomyces kurssanovii (Preobrazhenskaya et al. 1957) Pridham et al. 1958 (Approved Lists 1980)

== L ==
- Streptomyces labedae Lacey 1987
- Streptomyces lacrimifluminis Zhang et al. 2016
- "Streptomyces lactacystinaeus" Tomoda and Omura 2000
- Streptomyces lactacystinicus Také et al. 2017
- "Streptomyces lactamdurans" Stapley et al. 1972
- Streptomyces lacticiproducens Zhu et al. 2011
- Streptomyces laculatispora Zucchi et al. 2012
- Streptomyces lanatus Frommer 1959 (Approved Lists 1980)
- Streptomyces lannensis Promnuan et al. 2013
- Streptomyces lasalocidi Erwin et al. 2020
- "Streptomyces lasii" Liu et al. 2018
- Streptomyces lasiicapitis Ye et al. 2017
- Streptomyces lateritius (Sveshnikova 1957) Pridham et al. 1958 (Approved Lists 1980)
- Streptomyces laurentii Trejo et al. 1979 (Approved Lists 1980)
- Streptomyces lavendofoliae (Kuchaeva et al. 1961) Pridham 1970 (Approved Lists 1980)
- Streptomyces lavendulae (Waksman and Curtis 1916) Waksman and Henrici 1948 (Approved Lists 1980)
- Streptomyces lavenduligriseus (Locci et al. 1969) Witt and Stackebrandt 1991
- Streptomyces lavendulocolor (Kuchaeva et al. 1961) Pridham 1970 (Approved Lists 1980)
- Streptomyces leeuwenhoekii Busarakam et al. 2014
- Streptomyces levis Sveshnikova 1986
- "Streptomyces levoris" (ex Korenyako et al. 1960) Kuznetsov et al. 1998
- Streptomyces libani Baldacci and Grein 1966 (Approved Lists 1980)
- Streptomyces lichenis Saeng-in et al. 2018
- Streptomyces lienomycini Gauze and Maximova 1986
- Streptomyces lilacinus (Nakazawa et al. 1956) Witt and Stackebrandt 1991
- Streptomyces lincolnensis Mason et al. 1963 (Approved Lists 1980)
- Streptomyces litmocidini (Ryabova and Preobrazhenskaya 1957) Pridham et al. 1958 (Approved Lists 1980)
- Streptomyces litoralis Ma et al. 2016
- "Streptomyces lividoclavatus" Arai et al. 1977
- "Streptomyces lohii" Zhang et al. 2013
- Streptomyces lomondensis Johnson and Dietz 1969 (Approved Lists 1980)
- Streptomyces lonarensis Sharma et al. 2016
- Streptomyces longisporoflavus Waksman 1953 (Approved Lists 1980)
- Streptomyces longispororuber Waksman 1953 (Approved Lists 1980)
- Streptomyces longisporus (Krassilnikov 1941) Waksman 1953 (Approved Lists 1980)
- Streptomyces longwoodensis Prosser and Palleroni 1981
- Streptomyces lopnurensis Zheng et al. 2014
- Streptomyces lucensis Arcamone et al 1957 (Approved Lists 1980)
- Streptomyces lunaelactis Maciejewska et al. 2015
- Streptomyces lunalinharesii de Souza et al. 2008
- "Streptomyces luozhongensis" Zhang et al. 2017
- Streptomyces luridus (Krassilnikov et al. 1957) Waksman 1961 (Approved Lists 1980)
- Streptomyces lushanensis Zhang et al. 2015
- Streptomyces lusitanus Villax 1963 (Approved Lists 1980)
- Streptomyces luteireticuli (ex Katoh and Arai 1957) Hatano et al. 2003
- Streptomyces luteogriseus Schmitz et al. 1964 (Approved Lists 1980)
- Streptomyces luteosporeus Witt and Stackebrandt 1991
- Streptomyces luteus Luo et al. 2017
- "Streptomyces lutosisoli" Shen et al. 2018
- Streptomyces lycii Ma et al. 2020
- "Streptomyces lydicamycinicus" Komaki et al. 2020
- Streptomyces lydicus De Boer et al. 1956 (Approved Lists 1980)

== M ==
- "Streptomyces macromomyceticus" Hamada and Okami 1968
- Streptomyces macrosporus (ex Krassilnikov et al. 1968) Goodfellow et al. 1988
- Streptomyces malachitofuscus (ex Preobrazhenskaya et al. 1964) Preobrazhenskaya and Terekhova 1986
- Streptomyces malachitospinus (ex Preobrazhenskaya et al. 1957) Preobrazhenskaya and Terekhova 1986
- "Streptomyces malayensis" McBride et al. 1969
- "Streptomyces malaysiense" Ser et al. 2016
- Streptomyces malaysiensis Al-Tai et al. 1999
- Streptomyces manganisoli Mo et al. 2018
- "Streptomyces mangrovi" Yousif et al. 2015
- Streptomyces mangrovi Wang et al. 2015
- "Streptomyces mangrovisoli" Ser et al. 2015
- Streptomyces manipurensis Nimaichand et al. 2021
- "Streptomyces maoxianensis" Guan et al. 2015
- "Streptomyces marianii" Iniyan et al. 2021
- Streptomyces marinus Khan et al. 2010
- Streptomyces marokkonensis Bouizgarne et al. 2009
- Streptomyces mashuensis (Sawazaki et al. 1955) Witt and Stackebrandt 1991
- Streptomyces massasporeus Shinobu and Kawato 1959 (Approved Lists 1980)
- "Streptomyces massilialgeriensis" Djaballah et al. 2018
- "Streptomyces massiliensis" Pfleiderer et al. 2013
- Streptomyces mauvecolor Okami and Umezawa 1961 (Approved Lists 1980)
- Streptomyces mayteni Chen et al. 2009
- Streptomyces megasporus (ex Krassilnikov et al. 1968) Agre 1986
- Streptomyces melanosporofaciens Arcamone et al. 1959 (Approved Lists 1980)
- "Streptomyces melanovinaceus" Tomita et al. 1983
- Streptomyces mesophilus Tokatli et al. 2021
- Streptomyces mexicanus Petrosyan et al. 2003
- Streptomyces michiganensis Corbaz et al. 1957 (Approved Lists 1980)
- Streptomyces microflavus (Krainsky 1914) Waksman and Henrici 1948 (Approved Lists 1980)
- Streptomyces milbemycinicus Kumar and Goodfellow 2010
- Streptomyces mimosae Klykleung et al. 2020
- Streptomyces minutiscleroticus (Thirumalachar 1965) Pridham 1970 (Approved Lists 1980)
- Streptomyces mirabilis Ruschmann 1952 (Approved Lists 1980)
- Streptomyces misionensis Cercos et al. 1962 (Approved Lists 1980)
- Streptomyces mobaraensis (Nagatsu and Suzuki 1963) Witt and Stackebrandt 1991
- "Streptomyces monashensis" Law et al. 2019
- Streptomyces monomycini Gauze and Terekhova 1986
- Streptomyces montanus Jiang et al. 2020
- "Streptomyces monticola" Li et al. 2019
- Streptomyces mordarskii Kumar and Goodfellow 2008
- Streptomyces morookaense corrig. (Locci and Schofield 1989) Witt and Stackebrandt 1991
- Streptomyces muensis Ningthoujam et al. 2014
- Streptomyces murinus Frommer 1959 (Approved Lists 1980)
- Streptomyces mutabilis (Preobrazhenskaya and Ryabova 1957) Pridham et al. 1958 (Approved Lists 1980)
- Streptomyces mutomycini Gauze and Maximova 1986
- "Streptomyces myxogenes" Itoh et al. 1981

== N ==
- Streptomyces naganishii Yamaguchi and Saburi 1955 (Approved Lists 1980)
- "Streptomyces nanchangensis" Ouyang et al. 1984
- Streptomyces nanhaiensis Tian et al. 2012
- "Streptomyces nanningensis" Jiang et al. 2005
- Streptomyces nanshensis Tian et al. 2009
- Streptomyces narbonensis Corbaz et al. 1955 (Approved Lists 1980)
- Streptomyces nashvillensis McVeigh and Reyes 1961 (Approved Lists 1980)
- "Streptomyces natalensis" Struyk et al. 1958
- "Streptomyces neopeptinius" Han et al. 2008
- Streptomyces netropsis (Finlay et al. 1951) Witt and Stackebrandt 1991
- Streptomyces neyagawaensis Yamamoto et al. 1960 (Approved Lists 1980)
- Streptomyces niger (Thirumalachar 1955) Goodfellow et al. 1986
- "Streptomyces nigra" Chen et al. 2018
- Streptomyces nigrescens (Sveshnikova 1957) Pridham et al. 1958 (Approved Lists 1980)
- Streptomyces nitrosporeus Okami 1952 (Approved Lists 1980)
- Streptomyces niveiscabiei Park et al. 2003
- Streptomyces niveoruber Ettlinger et al. 1958 (Approved Lists 1980)
- Streptomyces niveus Smith et al. 1956 (Approved Lists 1980)
- "Streptomyces nobilis" Baldacci et al. 1965
- Streptomyces noboritoensis Isono et al. 1957 (Approved Lists 1980)
- Streptomyces nodosus Trejo 1961 (Approved Lists 1980)
- Streptomyces nogalater Bhuyan and Dietz 1966 (Approved Lists 1980)
- Streptomyces nojiriensis Ishida et al. 1967 (Approved Lists 1980)
- Streptomyces noursei Brown et al. 1953 (Approved Lists 1980)
- Streptomyces novaecaesareae Waksman and Henrici 1948 (Approved Lists 1980)
- "Streptomyces novoguineensis" Iwasa et al. 1977

== O ==
- "Streptomyces oceani" Tian et al. 2012
- Streptomyces ochraceiscleroticus Pridham 1970 (Approved Lists 1980)
- Streptomyces odonnellii Pereira et al. 2017
- Streptomyces olivaceiscleroticus Pridham 1970 (Approved Lists 1980)
- Streptomyces olivaceoviridis (Preobrazhenskaya and Ryabova 1957) Pridham et al. 1958 (Approved Lists 1980)
- Streptomyces olivaceus (Waksman 1923) Waksman and Henrici 1948 (Approved Lists 1980)
- Streptomyces olivicoloratus Nguyen and Kim 2015
- Streptomyces olivochromogenes (Waksman 1923) Waksman and Henrici 1948 (Approved Lists 1980)
- Streptomyces olivomycini (Gauze and Sveshnikova 1986) Witt and Stackebrandt 1991
- "Streptomyces olivovariabilis" Zhdanovich et al. 1982
- Streptomyces olivoverticillatus (Shinobu 1956) Witt and Stackebrandt 1991
- Streptomyces omiyaensis Umezawa and Okami 1950 (Approved Lists 1980)
- Streptomyces orinoci (Cassinelli et al. 1967) Witt and Stackebrandt 1991
- "Streptomyces ornatus" Calot and Cercos 1963
- Streptomyces oryzae Mingma et al. 2016
- Streptomyces oryziradicis Li et al. 2020
- Streptomyces osmaniensis Reddy et al. 2010
- "Streptomyces ossamyceticus" (Schmitz et al. 1965) Rong and Huang 2012
- Streptomyces otsuchiensis Terahara et al. 2019
- Streptomyces ovatisporus Veyisoglu et al. 2016

== P ==
- Streptomyces pactum Bhuyan et al. 1962 (Approved Lists 1980)
- Streptomyces palmae Sujarit et al. 2016
- Streptomyces paludis Zhao et al. 2020
- Streptomyces panacagri Cui et al. 2012
- Streptomyces panaciradicis Lee et al. 2014
- Streptomyces paradoxus Goodfellow et al. 1986
- Streptomyces paromomycinus (Coffey et al. 1959) Komaki and Tamura 2019
- Streptomyces parvulus corrig. Waksman and Gregory 1954 (Approved Lists 1980)
- Streptomyces parvus (Krainsky 1914) Waksman and Henrici 1948 (Approved Lists 1980)
- Streptomyces pathocidini (Nagatsu et al. 1962) Labeda et al. 2014
- Streptomyces paucisporeus Xu et al. 2006
- "Streptomyces paulus" Hanka and Dietz 1976
- "Streptomyces pentaticus" Umezawa et al. 1958
- Streptomyces peucetius Grein et al. 1963 (Approved Lists 1980)
- Streptomyces phaeochromogenes (Conn 1917) Waksman 1957 (Approved Lists 1980)
- Streptomyces phaeofaciens Maeda et al. 1952 (Approved Lists 1980)
- Streptomyces phaeolivaceus Mo et al. 2020
- Streptomyces phaeoluteichromatogenes Goodfellow et al. 2008
- Streptomyces phaeoluteigriseus Goodfellow et al. 2008
- Streptomyces pharetrae Le Roes and Meyers 2005
- Streptomyces pharmamarensis Carro et al. 2012
- "Candidatus Streptomyces philanthi" Kaltenpoth et al. 2006
- Streptomyces phyllanthi Klykleung et al. 2016
- "Streptomyces physcomitrii" Zhuang et al. 2020
- Streptomyces phytohabitans Bian et al. 2012
- Streptomyces pilosus Ettlinger et al. 1958 (Approved Lists 1980)
- Streptomyces pini Madhaiyan et al. 2016
- "Streptomyces piniterrae" Zhuang et al. 2020
- Streptomyces platensis Tresner and Backus 1956 (Approved Lists 1980)
- Streptomyces plicatus Pridham et al. 1958 (Approved Lists 1980)
- Streptomyces plumbiresistens Guo et al. 2009
- Streptomyces pluricolorescens Okami and Umezawa 1961 (Approved Lists 1980)
- Streptomyces pluripotens Lee et al. 2014
- Streptomyces pococaldensis Destefano et al. 2026
- "Streptomyces polaris" Kamjam et al. 2019
- Streptomyces polyantibioticus Le Roes-Hill and Meyers 2009
- "Streptomyces polyasparticus" Liu et al. 2021
- Streptomyces polychromogenes Hagemann et al. 1964 (Approved Lists 1980)
- Streptomyces polygonati Guo et al. 2016
- Streptomyces polymachus Nguyen and Kim 2015
- "Streptomyces polyrhachii" Yu et al. 2013
- Streptomyces poonensis (Thirumalachar 1960) Pridham 1970 (Approved Lists 1980)
- Streptomyces populi Wang et al. 2018
- Streptomyces prasinopilosus Ettlinger et al. 1958 (Approved Lists 1980)
- Streptomyces prasinosporus Tresner et al. 1966 (Approved Lists 1980)
- Streptomyces prasinus Ettlinger et al. 1958 (Approved Lists 1980)
- Streptomyces pratens Kim et al. 2012
- Streptomyces pratensis Rong et al. 2014
- "Streptomyces propurpuratus" Shinobu and Kanda 1970
- Streptomyces prunicolor (Ryabova and Preobrazhenskaya 1957) Pridham et al. 1958 (Approved Lists 1980)
- Streptomyces pseudoechinosporeus Goodfellow et al. 1986
- Streptomyces pseudogriseolus Okami and Umezawa 1955 (Approved Lists 1980)
- Streptomyces pseudovenezuelae (Kuchaeva et al. 1961) Pridham 1970 (Approved Lists 1980)
- Streptomyces pulveraceus Shibata et al. 1961 (Approved Lists 1980)
- Streptomyces puniceus Patelski 1951 (Approved Lists 1980)
- Streptomyces puniciscabiei Park et al. 2003
- Streptomyces purpurascens Lindenbein 1952 (Approved Lists 1980)
- Streptomyces purpureus (Matsumae and Hata 1968) Goodfellow et al. 1986
- Streptomyces purpurogeneiscleroticus corrig. Pridham 1970 (Approved Lists 1980)

== Q ==
- "Streptomyces qaidamensis" Zhang et al. 2018
- Streptomyces qinglanensis Hu et al. 2012
- "Streptomyces qinlingensis" Ji et al. 2007
- Streptomyces qinzhouensis Zhu et al. 2020

== R ==
- Streptomyces racemochromogenes Sugai 1956 (Approved Lists 1980)
- Streptomyces radiopugnans Mao et al. 2007
- Streptomyces rameus Shibata 1959 (Approved Lists 1980)
- Streptomyces ramulosus Ettlinger et al. 1958 (Approved Lists 1980)
- Streptomyces rapamycinicus Kumar and Goodfellow 2008
- Streptomyces recifensis (Gonçalves de Lima et al. 1955) Falcão de Morais et al. 1957 (Approved Lists 1980)
- Streptomyces rectiviolaceus (ex Artamonova 1965) Sveshnikova 1986
- Streptomyces regensis Gupta et al. 1963 (Approved Lists 1980)
- Streptomyces reniochalinae Li et al. 2019
- Streptomyces resistomycificus Lindenbein 1952 (Approved Lists 1980)
- Streptomyces reticuliscabiei Bouchek-Mechiche et al. 2000
- Streptomyces rhizophilus Lee and Whang 2014
- Streptomyces rhizosphaericola Vargas Hoyos et al. 2019
- Streptomyces rhizosphaericus corrig. Sembiring et al. 2001
- Streptomyces rhizosphaerihabitans Lee and Whang 2016
- "Streptomyces ribosidificus" Shomura et al. 1970
- Streptomyces rimosus Sobin et al. 1953 (Approved Lists 1980)
- Streptomyces rishiriensis Kawaguchi et al. 1965 (Approved Lists 1980)
- Streptomyces rochei Berger et al. 1953 (Approved Lists 1980)
- Streptomyces roietensis Kaewkla and Franco 2017
- Streptomyces rosealbus corrig. Xu et al. 2012
- Streptomyces roseicoloratus Zhang et al. 2020
- Streptomyces roseifaciens van der Aart et al. 2019
- Streptomyces roseiscleroticus Pridham 1970 (Approved Lists 1980)
- Streptomyces roseofulvus (Preobrazhenskaya 1957) Pridham et al. 1958 (Approved Lists 1980)
- Streptomyces roseolilacinus (Preobrazhenskaya and Sveshnikova 1957) Pridham et al. 1958 (Approved Lists 1980)
- Streptomyces roseolus (Preobrazhenskaya and Sveshnikova 1957) Pridham et al. 1958 (Approved Lists 1980)
- Streptomyces roseoviolaceus (Sveshnikova 1957) Pridham et al. 1958 (Approved Lists 1980)
- Streptomyces roseoviridis (Preobrazhenskaya 1957) Pridham et al. 1958 (Approved Lists 1980)
- "Streptomyces rubellomurinus" Okuhara et al. 1980
- Streptomyces ruber (Thirumalachar 1955) Goodfellow et al. 1986
- Streptomyces rubidus Xu et al. 2006
- Streptomyces rubiginosohelvolus (Kudrina 1957) Pridham et al. 1958 (Approved Lists 1980)
- Streptomyces rubiginosus (Preobrazhenskaya et al. 1957) Pridham et al. 1958 (Approved Lists 1980)
- Streptomyces rubrisoli Guo et al. 2015
- Streptomyces rubrogriseus (ex Krassilnikov 1970) Terekhova 1986
- Streptomyces rubrus corrig. Khan et al. 2011
- "Streptomyces rugosporus" Singh et al. 1994

== S ==
- "Streptomyces sabulosicollis" Kusuma et al. 2021
- Streptomyces salilacus Luo et al. 2018
- Streptomyces samsunensis Sazak et al. 2011
- "Streptomyces sandaensis" Iwami et al. 1987
- Streptomyces sanglieri Manfio et al. 2003
- Streptomyces sannanensis Iwasaki et al. 1981
- Streptomyces sanyensis Sui et al. 2011
- Streptomyces sasae Lee and Whang 2015
- Streptomyces scabichelini Gencbay et al. 2021
- Streptomyces scabiei corrig. (ex Thaxter 1891) Lambert and Loria 1989
- "Streptomyces sclerogranulatus" Shimazu et al. 1969
- Streptomyces sclerotialus Pridham 1970 (Approved Lists 1980)
- Streptomyces scopiformis Li et al. 2002
- Streptomyces scopuliridis Farris et al. 2011
- Streptomyces sedi Li et al. 2009
- Streptomyces sediminis Ay et al. 2018
- Streptomyces seoulensis Chun et al. 1997
- "Streptomyces septentrionalis" Kamjam et al. 2019
- Streptomyces seymenliensis Tatar and Sahin 2015
- Streptomyces shaanxiensis Lin et al. 2012
- Streptomyces shenzhenensis Hu et al. 2012
- Streptomyces shimoyamaii Destefano et al. 2026
- Streptomyces showdoensis Nishimura et al. 1964 (Approved Lists 1980)
- Streptomyces siamensis Sripreechasak et al. 2016
- Streptomyces silaceus Labeda et al. 2009
- Streptomyces similanensis Sripreechasak et al. 2016
- Streptomyces sindenensis Nakazawa and Fujii 1957 (Approved Lists 1980)
- Streptomyces sioyaensis Nishimura et al. 1961 (Approved Lists 1980)
- Streptomyces smaragdinus Schwitalla et al. 2020
- Streptomyces smyrnaeus Tatar et al. 2014
- Streptomyces sodiiphilus Li et al. 2005
- "Streptomyces soli" Xing et al. 2020
- Streptomyces solisilvae Zhou et al. 2017
- Streptomyces somaliensis (Brumpt 1906) Waksman and Henrici 1948 (Approved Lists 1980)
- "Streptomyces songpinggouensis" Guan et al. 2016
- "Streptomyces spadicogriseus" Komatsu et al. 1980
- Streptomyces sparsogenes Owen et al. 1963 (Approved Lists 1980)
- Streptomyces sparsus Jiang et al. 2011
- Streptomyces specialis Kämpfer et al. 2008
- Streptomyces spectabilis Mason et al. 1961 (Approved Lists 1980)
- Streptomyces speibonae Meyers et al. 2003
- Streptomyces speleomycini Preobrazhenskaya and Szabó 1986
- Streptomyces spinoverrucosus Diab and Al-Gounaim 1982
- Streptomyces spiralis (Falcão de Morais 1970) Goodfellow et al. 1986
- Streptomyces spiroverticillatus Shinobu 1958 (Approved Lists 1980)
- Streptomyces spongiae Khan et al. 2011
- Streptomyces spongiicola Huang et al. 2016
- Streptomyces sporangiiformans Zhao et al. 2020
- Streptomyces spororaveus (ex Krassilnikov 1970) Preobrazhenskaya 1986
- Streptomyces sporoverrucosus (ex Krassilnikov 1970) Preobrazhenskaya 1986
- Streptomyces staurosporininus Kim et al. 2012
- "Streptomyces steffisburgensis" Dietz 1967
- Streptomyces stelliscabiei Bouchek-Mechiche et al. 2000
- Streptomyces stramineus Labeda et al. 1997
- Streptomyces subrutilus Arai et al. 1964 (Approved Lists 1980)
- "Streptomyces sudanensis" Quintana et al. 2008
- Streptomyces sulfonofaciens Miyadoh et al. 1983
- Streptomyces sulphureus (Gasperini 1894) Waksman 1953 (Approved Lists 1980)
- Streptomyces sundarbansensis Arumugam et al. 2011
- "Streptomyces sviceus" Hanka and Dietz 1973
- Streptomyces swartbergensis Le Roes-Hill et al. 2018
- Streptomyces synnematoformans Hozzein and Goodfellow 2007

== T ==
- Streptomyces tacrolimicus Martínez-Castro et al. 2011
- Streptomyces tailanensis Sun et al. 2020
- "Streptomyces taklimakanensis" Yuan et al. 2020
- Streptomyces tanashiensis Hata et al. 1952 (Approved Lists 1980)
- Streptomyces tateyamensis Khan et al. 2010
- Streptomyces tauricus (ex Ivanitskaya et al. 1966) Sveshnikova 1986
- Streptomyces tendae Ettlinger et al. 1958 (Approved Lists 1980)
- "Streptomyces tenjimariensis" Okami et al. 1979
- Streptomyces termitum Duché et al. 1951 (Approved Lists 1980)
- Streptomyces thermoalcalitolerans Kim et al. 1999
- "Streptomyces thermoalkaliphilus" Wu et al. 2018
- Streptomyces thermoautotrophicus Gadkari et al. 1991
- Streptomyces thermocarboxydovorans Kim et al. 1998
- Streptomyces thermocarboxydus Kim et al. 1998
- Streptomyces thermocoprophilus Kim et al. 2000
- Streptomyces thermodiastaticus (Bergey et al. 1923) Waksman 1953 (Approved Lists 1980)
- Streptomyces thermogriseus Xu et al. 1998
- Streptomyces thermolineatus Goodfellow et al. 1988
- Streptomyces thermospinosisporus corrig. Kim and Goodfellow 2002
- Streptomyces thermoviolaceus Henssen 1957 (Approved Lists 1980)
- Streptomyces thermovulgaris Henssen 1957 (Approved Lists 1980)
- Streptomyces thinghirensis Loqman et al. 2009
- "Streptomyces thiolactonus" Dolak et al. 1986
- Streptomyces thioluteus (Okami 1952) Witt and Stackebrandt 1991
- "Streptomyces tibetensis" Li et al. 2020
- Streptomyces tirandamycinicus Huang et al. 2019
- "Streptomyces tokashikiensis" Iwami et al. 1989
- "Streptomyces tokunonensis" Kawamura et al. 1982
- "Streptomyces tolypophorus" Shibata et al. 1971
- Streptomyces torulosus Lyons and Pridham 1971 (Approved Lists 1980)
- Streptomyces toxytricini (Preobrazhenskaya and Sveshnikova 1957) Pridham et al. 1958 (Approved Lists 1980)
- Streptomyces tremellae Wen et al. 2016
- Streptomyces tricolor (Wollenweber 1920) Waksman 1961 (Approved Lists 1980)
- Streptomyces triticagri Han et al. 2020
- Streptomyces tritici Zhao et al. 2018
- "Streptomyces triticiradicis" Yu et al. 2020
- Streptomyces triticirhizae Han et al. 2020
- Streptomyces triticisoli Tian et al. 2018
- Streptomyces tritolerans Dastager et al. 2009
- Streptomyces tsukubensis Muramatsu and Nagai 2013
- Streptomyces tubercidicus Nakamura 1961 (Approved Lists 1980)
- Streptomyces tuirus Albert and Malaquias de Querioz 1963 (Approved Lists 1980)
- Streptomyces tunisialbus Ayed et al. 2020
- Streptomyces tunisiensis Slama et al. 2014
- Streptomyces turgidiscabies Miyajima et al. 1998
- "Streptomyces typhae" Peng et al. 2021
- Streptomyces tyrosinilyticus Zhao et al. 2015

== U ==
- Streptomyces umbrinus (Sveshnikova 1957) Pridham et al. 1958 (Approved Lists 1980)
- "Streptomyces uncialis" Williams et al. 2008
- "Streptomyces unzenensis" Kuroda et al. 1980
- Streptomyces ureilyticus Tokatli et al. 2021
- "Streptomyces urticae" Piao et al. 2018

== V ==
- Streptomyces variabilis (Preobrazhenskaya et al. 1957) Pridham et al. 1958 (Approved Lists 1980)
- Streptomyces variegatus Sveshnikova and Timuk 1986
- Streptomyces varsoviensis Kurylowicz and Woznicka 1967 (Approved Lists 1980)
- Streptomyces vastus Szabó and Marton 1958 (Approved Lists 1980)
- Streptomyces venetus Sujarit et al. 2018
- Streptomyces venezuelae Ehrlich et al. 1948 (Approved Lists 1980)
- Streptomyces verrucosisporus Phongsopitanun et al. 2016
- "Streptomyces verticillus" Takita 1959
- Streptomyces vietnamensis Zhu et al. 2007
- Streptomyces vinaceus Jones 1952 (Approved Lists 1980)
- Streptomyces vinaceusdrappus Pridham et al. 1958 (Approved Lists 1980)
- Streptomyces violaceochromogenes (Ryabova and Preobrazhenskaya 1957) Pridham 1970 (Approved Lists 1980)
- Streptomyces violaceolatus (Krassilnikov et al. 1965) Pridham 1970 (Approved Lists 1980)
- Streptomyces violaceorectus (Ryabova and Preobrazhenskaya 1957) Pridham et al. 1958 (Approved Lists 1980)
- Streptomyces violaceoruber (Waksman and Curtis 1916) Pridham 1970 (Approved Lists 1980)
- Streptomyces violaceorubidus Terekhova 1986
- Streptomyces violaceus (Rossi Doria 1891) Waksman 1953 (Approved Lists 1980)
- Streptomyces violaceusniger corrig. (Waksman and Curtis 1916) Pridham et al. 1958 (Approved Lists 1980)
- Streptomyces violarus (Artamonova and Krassilnikov 1960) Pridham 1970 (Approved Lists 1980)
- Streptomyces violascens (Preobrazhenskaya and Sveshnikova 1957) Pridham et al. 1958 (Approved Lists 1980)
- Streptomyces violens (Kalakoutskii and Krassilnikov 1960) Goodfellow et al. 1987
- Streptomyces virens Gauze and Sveshnikova 1986
- Streptomyces virginiae Grundy et al. 1952 (Approved Lists 1980)
- Streptomyces viridis Kim et al. 2013
- Streptomyces viridiviolaceus (Ryabova and Preobrazhenskaya 1957) Pridham et al. 1958 (Approved Lists 1980)
- Streptomyces viridobrunneus (ex Krassilnikov 1970) Terekhova 1986
- Streptomyces viridochromogenes (Krainsky 1914) Waksman and Henrici 1948 (Approved Lists 1980)
- Streptomyces viridodiastaticus (Baldacci et al. 1955) Pridham et al. 1958 (Approved Lists 1980)
- Streptomyces viridosporus Pridham et al. 1958 (Approved Lists 1980)
- Streptomyces vitaminophilus corrig. (Shomura et al. 1983) Goodfellow et al. 1986
- "Streptomyces vulcanius" Jia et al. 2015

== W ==
- Streptomyces wedmorensis (ex Milard and Burr 1926) Preobrazhenskaya 1986
- Streptomyces wellingtoniae Kumar and Goodfellow 2010
- Streptomyces werraensis Wallhäusser et al. 1964 (Approved Lists 1980)
- Streptomyces wuyuanensis Zhang et al. 2013

== X ==
- Streptomyces xanthochromogenes Arishima et al. 1956 (Approved Lists 1980)
- Streptomyces xantholiticus (Konev and Tsyganov 1962) Pridham 1970 (Approved Lists 1980)
- Streptomyces xanthophaeus Lindenbein 1952 (Approved Lists 1980)
- Streptomyces xiamenensis Xu et al. 2009
- "Streptomyces xiangluensis" Zhao et al. 2018
- Streptomyces xiangtanensis Mo et al. 2021
- "Streptomyces xiaopingdaonensis" Chen et al. 2015
- Streptomyces xinghaiensis Zhao et al. 2009
- "Streptomyces xinjiangensis" Cheng et al. 2016
- Streptomyces xishensis Xu et al. 2012
- Streptomyces xylanilyticus Moonmangmee et al. 2017

== Y ==
- Streptomyces yaanensis Zheng et al. 2013
- Streptomyces yanglinensis Xu et al. 2006
- Streptomyces yangpuensis Tang et al. 2016
- Streptomyces yanii Liu et al. 2005
- Streptomyces yatensis Saintpierre et al. 2003
- Streptomyces yeochonensis Kim et al. 2004
- Streptomyces yerevanensis Goodfellow et al. 1986
- Streptomyces yogyakartensis Sembiring et al. 2001
- Streptomyces yokosukanensis Nakamura 1961 (Approved Lists 1980)
- Streptomyces youssoufiensis Hamdali et al. 2011
- Streptomyces yunnanensis Zhang et al. 2003

== Z ==
- Streptomyces zagrosensis Mohammadipanah et al. 2014
- Streptomyces zaomyceticus Hinuma 1954 (Approved Lists 1980)
- "Streptomyces zelensis" Hanka et al. 1978
- Streptomyces zhaozhouensis He et al. 2014
- Streptomyces zhihengii Huang et al. 2017
- Streptomyces zinciresistens Lin et al. 2011
- Streptomyces ziwulingensis Lin et al. 2013
