= Streptomyces cellulolyticus =

Scientific classification
- Domain: Bacteria
- Kingdom: Bacillati
- Phylum: Actinomycetota
- Class: Actinomycetes
- Order: Streptomycetales
- Family: Streptomycetaceae
- Genus: Streptomyces
- Species: S. cellulolyticus

Binomial name
- Streptomyces cellulolyticus Li 1997

Species of bacterium

Streptomyces cellulolyticus is a cellulolytic bacterium species from the genus of Streptomyces.

== See also ==
- List of Streptomyces species
