= Streptomyces manganisoli =

Scientific classification
- Domain: Bacteria
- Kingdom: Bacillati
- Phylum: Actinomycetota
- Class: Actinomycetia
- Order: Streptomycetales
- Family: Streptomycetaceae
- Genus: Streptomyces
- Species: S. manganisoli

Binomial name
- Streptomyces manganisoli Mo et al. 2018

Type strain
- MK44

Species of bacterium

Streptomyces manganisoli is a bacterium species from the genus of Streptomyces which has been isolated from soil near the Xiangtan Manganese Mine in China.

== See also ==
- List of Streptomyces species
