= Streptomyces janthinus =

Scientific classification
- Domain: Bacteria
- Kingdom: Bacillati
- Phylum: Actinomycetota
- Class: Actinomycetes
- Order: Streptomycetales
- Family: Streptomycetaceae
- Genus: Streptomyces
- Species: S. janthinus

Binomial name
- Streptomyces janthinus (Artamonova and Krassilnikov 1960) Pridham 1970 (Approved Lists 1980)

Type strain
- ATCC 15870, ATCC 23925, BCRC 12074, CBS 909.68, CCRC 12074, CCT 5008, DSM 40206, IFO 12879, INMI 117, ISP 5206, JCM 4387, KCC S-0387, LMG 8591, NBRC 12879, NRRL B-3365, NRRL-ISP 5206, RIA 1155, RIA 659, VKM Ac-208

Synonyms
- "Actinomyces janthinus" Artamonova and Krassilnikov 1960

Species of bacterium

Streptomyces janthinus is a bacterium species from the genus of Streptomyces which has been isolated from soil in Russia.

== See also ==
- List of Streptomyces species
