= Streptomyces tuirus =

Scientific classification
- Domain: Bacteria
- Kingdom: Bacillati
- Phylum: Actinomycetota
- Class: Actinomycetes
- Order: Streptomycetales
- Family: Streptomycetaceae
- Genus: Streptomyces
- Species: S. tuirus

Binomial name
- Streptomyces tuirus Albert and Malaquias de Querioz 1963

Type strain
- ATCC 19007, BCRC 12217, CBS 719.72, CCRC 12217, CGMCC 4.1758, DSM 40505, IAUR 3121, ICSSB 1017, IFO 13418, IFO 15617, ISP 5505, JCM 4255, JCM 4846, NBRC 13418, NBRC 15617, NRRL B-3631, NRRL-ISP 5505, RIA 1379

Species of bacterium

Streptomyces tuirus is a bacterium species from the genus of Streptomyces which has been isolated from soil. Streptomyces tuirus produces tuoromycin.

== See also ==
- List of Streptomyces species
