= Streptomyces wuyuanensis =

Scientific classification
- Domain: Bacteria
- Kingdom: Bacillati
- Phylum: Actinomycetota
- Class: Actinomycetia
- Order: Streptomycetales
- Family: Streptomycetaceae
- Genus: Streptomyces
- Species: S. wuyuanensis

Binomial name
- Streptomyces wuyuanensis Zhang et al. 2013

Type strain
- CGMCC 4.7042, FX61, KCTC 29112

Species of bacterium

Streptomyces wuyuanensis is a bacterium species from the genus of Streptomyces which has been isolated from a saline sample from the Inner Mongolia in China.

== See also ==
- List of Streptomyces species
