= Streptomyces vietnamensis =

Scientific classification
- Domain: Bacteria
- Kingdom: Bacillati
- Phylum: Actinomycetota
- Class: Actinomycetes
- Order: Streptomycetales
- Family: Streptomycetaceae
- Genus: Streptomyces
- Species: S. vietnamensis

Binomial name
- Streptomyces vietnamensis Zhu et al. 2007

Type strain
- CCTCC M 205143, GIMV4.0001, IAM 15340, JCM 21785, NBRC 104153

Species of bacterium

Streptomyces vietnamensis is a bacterium species from the genus of Streptomyces which has been isolated from forest soil in Vietnam.

== See also ==
- List of Streptomyces species
