= Streptomyces abietis =

Scientific classification
- Domain: Bacteria
- Kingdom: Bacillati
- Phylum: Actinomycetota
- Class: Actinomycetia
- Order: Streptomycetales
- Family: Streptomycetaceae
- Genus: Streptomyces
- Species: S. abietis

Binomial name
- Streptomyces abietis Fujii et al. 2013

Type strain
- A191, DSM 42080, NBRC 109094

Species of bacterium

Streptomyces abietis is a cellulolytic bacterium species from the genus Streptomyces which was isolated from topsoil of a pine forest from the Hokkaido prefecture in Japan.

== See also ==
- List of Streptomyces species
