= Streptomyces violens =

Scientific classification
- Domain: Bacteria
- Kingdom: Bacillati
- Phylum: Actinomycetota
- Class: Actinomycetes
- Order: Streptomycetales
- Family: Streptomycetaceae
- Genus: Streptomyces
- Species: S. violens

Binomial name
- Streptomyces violens Goodfellow et al. 1987

Type strain
- ATCC 15898, BCRC 12540, CBS 451.65, CBS 787.72, CCRC 12540, CGMCC 4.1786, DSM 40597, HAMBI 1073, IFO 12557, IFO 13486, IMET 43407, ISP 5597, JCM 3072, JCM 4852, KCC 3072, LMG 20303, MTCC 6916, NBRC 12557, NBRC 13486, NCAIM B.01477, NRRL B-3484, NRRL-ISP 5597, PCM 2247, RIA 1447, RIA 565, VKM Ac-586, VKM Ac-653

Synonyms
- Chainia violens

Species of bacterium

Streptomyces violens is a bacterium species from the genus of Streptomyces.

== See also ==
- List of Streptomyces species
