= Streptomyces rectiviolaceus =

Scientific classification
- Domain: Bacteria
- Kingdom: Bacillati
- Phylum: Actinomycetota
- Class: Actinomycetes
- Order: Streptomycetales
- Family: Streptomycetaceae
- Genus: Streptomyces
- Species: S. rectiviolaceus

Binomial name
- Streptomyces rectiviolaceus Sveshnikova 1986

Type strain
- ATCC 43690, DSM 41459

Synonyms
- Actinomyces rectiviolaceus

Species of bacterium

Streptomyces rectiviolaceus is a bacterium species from the genus of Streptomyces.

== See also ==
- List of Streptomyces species
