= Streptomyces aureocirculatus =

Scientific classification
- Domain: Bacteria
- Kingdom: Bacillati
- Phylum: Actinomycetota
- Class: Actinomycetes
- Order: Streptomycetales
- Family: Streptomycetaceae
- Genus: Streptomyces
- Species: S. aureocirculatus

Binomial name
- Streptomyces aureocirculatus (Krassilnikov and Yuan 1965) Pridham 1970

Type strain
- 735, AS 4.1609, ATCC 15851, ATCC 19823, ATCC 25430, BCRC 16227, CBS 928.69, CCRC 16227, CGMCC 4.1609, DSM 40386, IFO 13018, INMI 735, ISP 5386, JCM 4454, NBRC 13018, NRRL B-3324, NRRL-ISP 5386, RIA 1210, RIA 682, VKM Ac-1826

Synonyms
- Actinomyces aureocirculatus

Species of bacterium

Streptomyces aureocirculatus is a bacterium species from the genus Streptomyces.

== See also ==
- List of Streptomyces species
