= Streptomyces lanatus =

Scientific classification
- Domain: Bacteria
- Kingdom: Bacillati
- Phylum: Actinomycetota
- Class: Actinomycetes
- Order: Streptomycetales
- Family: Streptomycetaceae
- Genus: Streptomyces
- Species: S. lanatus

Binomial name
- Streptomyces lanatus Frommer 1959

Type strain
- AS 4.1371, ATCC 19775, BCRC 12060, CBS 513.68, CCRC 12060, CGMCC 4.1371, CGMCC AS 4.1371, DSM 40090, ETH 24324, Frommer SV 1944, IFO 12787, ISP 5090, JCM 4332, JCM 4588, KCC S-0332, KCC S-0588, Lanoot R-8749, LMG 19380, NBRC 12787, NRRL B-2291, NRRL-ISP 5090, R-8749, RIA 1055, SV 1944, UNIQEM 161

Species of bacterium

Streptomyces lanatus is a bacterium species from the genus of Streptomyces which has been isolated from soil.

== See also ==
- List of Streptomyces species
