= Streptomyces drozdowiczii =

Scientific classification
- Domain: Bacteria
- Kingdom: Bacillati
- Phylum: Actinomycetota
- Class: Actinomycetes
- Order: Streptomycetales
- Family: Streptomycetaceae
- Genus: Streptomyces
- Species: S. drozdowiczii

Binomial name
- Streptomyces drozdowiczii Semêdo et al. 2004

Type strain
- CBMAI 498, CCT 5476, CIP 107837, DSM 41857, JCM 13580, M7a, NBRC 101007, NRRL B-24297

Species of bacterium

Streptomyces drozdowiczii is a cellulolytic bacterium species from the genus of Streptomyces which has been isolated from soil from the Mata Atlântica forest in Brazil.

== See also ==
- List of Streptomyces species
