= Streptomyces mauvecolor =

Scientific classification
- Domain: Bacteria
- Kingdom: Bacillati
- Phylum: Actinomycetota
- Class: Actinomycetes
- Order: Streptomycetales
- Family: Streptomycetaceae
- Genus: Streptomyces
- Species: S. mauvecolor

Binomial name
- Streptomyces mauvecolor Okami and Umezawa 1961

Type strain
- 1112-A3, AS 4.1997, AT 417, ATCC 29835, CGMCC 4.1997, DSM 41702, FH 2163, IFO 13854, IMC S-0489, JCM 5002, KCC S-1002, LMG 20100, NBRC 13854

Species of bacterium

Streptomyces mauvecolor is a bacterium species from the genus of Streptomyces which has been isolated from soil. Streptomyces mauvecolor produces peptimycin.

== See also ==
- List of Streptomyces species
