= Streptomyces pseudoechinosporeus =

Scientific classification
- Domain: Bacteria
- Kingdom: Bacillati
- Phylum: Actinomycetota
- Class: Actinomycetia
- Order: Streptomycetales
- Family: Streptomycetaceae
- Genus: Streptomyces
- Species: S. pseudoechinosporeus

Binomial name
- Streptomyces pseudoechinosporeus Goodfellow et al. 1986

Type strain
- AS 4.1207, AS 4.1228, ATCC 19618, CGMCC 4.1207, CGMCC 4.1228, CUB 161, DSM 43035, IFM 1243, IFO 12518, IMET 43494, JCM 3066, KCC 3066, KCC A-0066, KCTC 9178, LIA 442, NBIMCC 496, NBRC 12518, NCIMB 9918, NRRL B-16931, P-147, RIA 441, RIA 554, RIA 897, VKM Ac-1226

Synonyms
- Microellobosporia grisea

Species of bacterium

Streptomyces pseudoechinosporeus is a bacterium species from the genus of Streptomyces which has been isolated from sandy desert soil. Microellobosporia grisea was transferred to Streptomyces pseudoechinosporeus.

== See also ==
- List of Streptomyces species
