= Streptomyces xiamenensis =

Scientific classification
- Domain: Bacteria
- Kingdom: Bacillati
- Phylum: Actinomycetota
- Class: Actinomycetes
- Order: Streptomycetales
- Family: Streptomycetaceae
- Genus: Streptomyces
- Species: S. xiamenensis

Binomial name
- Streptomyces xiamenensis Xu et al. 2009

Type strain
- CGMCC 4.3534, DSM 41903, JCM 16123, MCCC 1A01550

Species of bacterium

Streptomyces xiamenensis is a bacterium species from the genus of Streptomyces which has been isolated from mangrove sediments in Xiamen in the Fujian Province in China. Streptomyces xiamenensis produces the antifibrotic drug xiamenmycin.

== See also ==
- List of Streptomyces species
