= Streptomyces kunmingensis =

Scientific classification
- Domain: Bacteria
- Kingdom: Bacillati
- Phylum: Actinomycetota
- Class: Actinomycetes
- Order: Streptomycetales
- Family: Streptomycetaceae
- Genus: Streptomyces
- Species: S. kunmingensis

Binomial name
- Streptomyces kunmingensis (Ruan et al. 1985) Goodfellow et al. 1986

Type strain
- ATCC 35682, CGMCC 4.1151, DSM 41681, IFO 14463, JCM 7473, MAS Ruan 80-3024, NBRC 14463, NRRL B-16240, Ruan 80-3024, VKM Ac-895, VKM Ac-895

Synonyms
- Chainia kunmingensis Ruan et al. 1985

Species of bacterium

Streptomyces kunmingensis is a bacterium species from the genus of Streptomyces which has been isolated from soil from the Dagyanlow's Lake in Kunming in China.

== Description ==
The species is spore-forming, mesophilic (prefers moderate temperature), and develops an aerial mycelium — typical of many Streptomyces. The type strain of S. kunmingensis (DSM 41681) is maintained in major microbial culture collections and can be obtained for research. Culture data indicate standard cultivation media and incubation at around 28 °C. A recent whole-genome sequencing project of a strain, S. kunmingensis TFRC-KFRI-1 assembled its genome into 12 contigs with a total size of about 4.76 megabases (Mb). The GC content was reported at 62.8%. The genome annotation identified 4,519 genes, including 4,451 protein-coding sequences (CDSs), along with rRNA and tRNA genes. Comparative analysis confirmed high sequence similarity (average nucleotide identity ~ 96.9%) to the type strain of S. Kunmingensis. A strain of S. kunmingensis produces a yellow-red extracellular pigment belonging to the chromopeptide class that has demonstrated potent antimicrobial activity against Methicillin-Resistant Staphylococcus aureus (MRSA) and Mycobacterium tuberculosis. The molecule also showed antiproliferative effects on various human cancer cell lines and had wound-healing efficacy in rat models. Recent work has used a strain named S. kunmingensis as a synbiotic supplement in feed for striped catfish (Pangasianodon hypophthalmus). Results after 3 months showed improved growth performance, enhanced nonspecific immunity (increased WBC, phagocytic activity), boosted lysozyme and complement activity, and significantly reduced mortality upon challenge with a pathogenic bacterium (Edwardsiella ictaluri). This suggests S. kunmingensis may be useful in sustainable aquaculture to enhance disease resistance.

== See also ==
- List of Streptomyces species
