= Streptomyces xanthophaeus =

Scientific classification
- Domain: Bacteria
- Kingdom: Bacillati
- Phylum: Actinomycetota
- Class: Actinomycetes
- Order: Streptomycetales
- Family: Streptomycetaceae
- Genus: Streptomyces
- Species: S. xanthophaeus

Binomial name
- Streptomyces xanthophaeus Lindenbein 1952

Type strain
- ATCC 19819, BCRC 12033, BCRC 13756, CBS 572.68, CCRC 12033, CCRC 13756, CGMCC 4.1931, DSM 40134, ETH 23892, IFO 12829, ISP 5134, JCM 4271, JCM 4426, KCC S-0426, KCTC 9220, NBRC 12829, NRRL B-5414, NRRL-ISP 5134, RIA 1099, RIA 704, UNIQEM 208, VKM Ac-1205, VKM Ac-1823, W\\u00fcst 70, Wust 70

Species of bacterium

Streptomyces xanthophaeus is a bacterium species from the genus of Streptomyces which has been isolated from soil. Streptomyces xanthophaeus produces geomycin, arginylthreonine and diadzein.

== See also ==
- List of Streptomyces species
