= Streptomyces cirratus =

Scientific classification
- Domain: Bacteria
- Kingdom: Bacillati
- Phylum: Actinomycetota
- Class: Actinomycetia
- Order: Streptomycetales
- Family: Streptomycetaceae
- Genus: Streptomyces
- Species: S. cirratus

Binomial name
- Streptomyces cirratus Koshiyama et al. 1963

Type strain
- 12090, A9745, AS 4.1679, ATCC 14699, BCRC 16208, Bristol 12090, CBS 699.72, CCRC 16208, CGMCC 4.1679, DSM 40479, IFO 13398, ISP 5479, JCM 4738, KCC S-0738, KCTC 9709, NBRC 13398, NRRL B-3250, NRRL-ISP 5479, RIA 1359, VKM Ac-620, VTT E-052935

Species of bacterium

Streptomyces cirratus is a bacterium species from the genus of Streptomyces. Streptomyces cirratus produces phegomycin, phegomycin D, phegomycin DGPT, cirratiomycin A, cirramycin A and cirramycin B.

== See also ==
- List of Streptomyces species
