= Streptomyces hebeiensis =

Scientific classification
- Domain: Bacteria
- Kingdom: Bacillati
- Phylum: Actinomycetota
- Class: Actinomycetia
- Order: Streptomycetales
- Family: Streptomycetaceae
- Genus: Streptomyces
- Species: S. hebeiensis

Binomial name
- Streptomyces hebeiensis Xu et al. 2004

Type strain
- CCTCC AA203005, CIP 107974, DSM 41837, JCM 12696, NBRC 100914, NBRC 101006, YIM 001

Species of bacterium

Streptomyces hebeiensis is a bacterium species from the genus of Streptomyces which has been isolated from soil from the Hebei province in China.

== See also ==
- List of Streptomyces species
