= Streptomyces ochraceiscleroticus =

Scientific classification
- Domain: Bacteria
- Kingdom: Bacillati
- Phylum: Actinomycetota
- Class: Actinomycetes
- Order: Streptomycetales
- Family: Streptomycetaceae
- Genus: Streptomyces
- Species: S. ochraceiscleroticus

Binomial name
- Streptomyces ochraceiscleroticus Pridham 1970

Type strain
- 10A-30, AS 4.1096, ATCC 15814, BCRC 13310, CBS 168.62, CBS 784.72, CCRC 13310, CGMCC 4.1096, DSM 40594, DSM 43155, IFO 12394, IFO 13483, IMET 43492, ISP 5594, JCM 3048, JCM 4801, KCC A-0048, KCC S-0801, Kuznetsov 10A-30, Lanoot R-8714, LMG 19349, NBRC 12394, NBRC 13483, NRRL B-3041, NRRL-ISP 5594, PCM 2307, R-8714, RIA 1444, RIA 710, VKM Ac-651

Synonyms
- Chainia ochracea

Species of bacterium

Streptomyces ochraceiscleroticus is a bacterium species from the genus of Streptomyces which has been isolated from soil.

== See also ==
- List of Streptomyces species
