= Streptomyces polaris =

Scientific classification
- Domain: Bacteria
- Kingdom: Bacillati
- Phylum: Actinomycetota
- Class: Actinomycetia
- Order: Streptomycetales
- Family: Streptomycetaceae
- Genus: Streptomyces
- Species: S. polaris

Binomial name
- Streptomyces polaris Kamjam et al. 2019

Species of bacterium

Streptomyces polaris is a bacterium species from the genus of Streptomyces which has been isolated from frozen soil from the Arctic.

== See also ==
- List of Streptomyces species
