= Streptomyces nashvillensis =

Scientific classification
- Domain: Bacteria
- Kingdom: Bacillati
- Phylum: Actinomycetota
- Class: Actinomycetia
- Order: Streptomycetales
- Family: Streptomycetaceae
- Genus: Streptomyces
- Species: S. nashvillensis

Binomial name
- Streptomyces nashvillensis Corbaz et al. 1955

Type strain
- ATCC 25476, BCRC 13625, CBS 886.69, CCRC 13625, CGMCC 4.1741, DSM 40314, IFO 13064, ISP 5314, JCM 4498, KCC S-0498, McVeigh V-8, NBRC 13064, NRRL B-2606, NRRL-ISP 5314, RIA 1256, V-8 T, VKM Ac-1766

Species of bacterium

Streptomyces nashvillensis is a bacterium species from the genus of Streptomyces which has been isolated from soil. Streptomyces nashvillensis produces tetrodecamycin and bellenamine.

== See also ==
- List of Streptomyces species
