= Streptomyces silaceus =

Scientific classification
- Domain: Bacteria
- Kingdom: Bacillati
- Phylum: Actinomycetota
- Class: Actinomycetes
- Order: Streptomycetales
- Family: Streptomycetaceae
- Genus: Streptomyces
- Species: S. silaceus

Binomial name
- Streptomyces silaceus Labeda et al. 2009

Type strain
- DSM 41861, LDDC 6638-99, NRRL B-24166

Species of bacterium

Streptomyces silaceus is a bacterium species from the genus of Streptomyces which has been isolated from an equine placenta in Lexington in Kentucky in the United States.

== See also ==
- List of Streptomyces species
