= Streptomyces yatensis =

Scientific classification
- Domain: Bacteria
- Kingdom: Bacillati
- Phylum: Actinomycetota
- Class: Actinomycetes
- Order: Streptomycetales
- Family: Streptomycetaceae
- Genus: Streptomyces
- Species: S. yatensis

Binomial name
- Streptomyces yatensis Saintpierre et al. 2003

Type strain
- CIP 109043, DSM 41771, JCM 13244, NBRC 101000, NRRL B-24116, SFOCin 76

Species of bacterium

Streptomyces yatensis is a bacterium species from the genus of Streptomyces which has been isolated from ultramafic soil in New Caledonia.

== See also ==
- List of Streptomyces species
