= Streptomyces spororaveus =

Scientific classification
- Domain: Bacteria
- Kingdom: Bacillati
- Phylum: Actinomycetota
- Class: Actinomycetes
- Order: Streptomycetales
- Family: Streptomycetaceae
- Genus: Streptomyces
- Species: S. spororaveus

Binomial name
- Streptomyces spororaveus Preobrazhenskaya 1986

Type strain
- AS 4.1926, ATCC 43694, CGMCC 4.1926, DSM 41462, IFO 15456, INMI 101, JCM 6928, LMG 20313, NBRC 15456, NRRL B-16378, VKM 318, VKM Ac-318

Synonyms
- Actinomyces spororaveus

Species of bacterium

Streptomyces spororaveus is a bacterium species from the genus of Streptomyces.

== See also ==
- List of Streptomyces species
