= Streptomyces malachitofuscus =

Scientific classification
- Domain: Bacteria
- Kingdom: Bacillati
- Phylum: Actinomycetota
- Class: Actinomycetes
- Order: Streptomycetales
- Family: Streptomycetaceae
- Genus: Streptomyces
- Species: S. malachitofuscus

Binomial name
- Streptomyces malachitofuscus (ex Preobrazhenskaya et al. 1964) Preobrazhenskaya and Terekhova 1986

Type strain
- ATCC 25471, BCRC 15143, CBS 881.69, CCRC 15143, CGMCC 4.1743, DSM 40332, IFO 13059, INA 739, ISP 5332, JCM 4493, KCC S-0493, LMG 20067, NBRC 13059, NRRL B-12273, NRRL-ISP 5332, RIA 1251, VKM Ac-1850

Synonyms
- Actinomyces malachitofuscus Preobrazhenskaya et al. 1964

Species of bacterium

Streptomyces malachitofuscus is a bacterium species from the genus of Streptomyces. Streptomyces malachitofuscus has antifungal metabolites.

== See also ==
- List of Streptomyces species
