= Streptomyces lavendulocolor =

Scientific classification
- Domain: Bacteria
- Kingdom: Bacillati
- Phylum: Actinomycetota
- Class: Actinomycetes
- Order: Streptomycetales
- Family: Streptomycetaceae
- Genus: Streptomyces
- Species: S. lavendulocolor

Binomial name
- Streptomyces lavendulocolor (Kuchaeva et al. 1961) Pridham 1970 (Approved Lists 1980)

Type strain
- ATCC 15871, ATCC 23927, BCRC 12057, CBS 911.68, CCRC 12057, CGMCC 4.1890, DSM 40216, IFO 12881, INA 4518, INA 4518 (A. lavendulae), INMI 4518, ISP 5216, JCM 4390, KCC S-0391, NBRC 12881, NCIB 9829, NCIMB 9829, NRRL, NRRL B-3367, NRRL-ISP 5216, RIA 1160, RIA 262, RIA 749, VKM Ac-215

Synonyms
- "Actinomyces lavendulocolor" Kuchaeva et al. 1961

Species of bacterium

Streptomyces lavendulocolor is a bacterium species from the genus of Streptomyces which has been isolated from soil in Russia.

== See also ==
- List of Streptomyces species
