= Streptomyces violaceus =

Scientific classification
- Domain: Bacteria
- Kingdom: Bacillati
- Phylum: Actinomycetota
- Class: Actinomycetes
- Order: Streptomycetales
- Family: Streptomycetaceae
- Genus: Streptomyces
- Species: S. violaceus

Binomial name
- Streptomyces violaceus Pridham 1970

Type strain
- ATCC 15891, ATCC 25516, BCRC 13791, CBS 658.69, CCRC 13791, CCT 5007, CECT 3237, CGMCC 4.1772, DSM 40205, DSMZ 40205, IFO 13104, INMI 1212, ISP 5205, JCM 4534, KCC S-0534, KCCM 40125, KCTC 9788, LMG 20275, NBRC 13104, NIHJ 493, NRRL B-5432, NRRL-ISP 5205, RIA 1296, RIA 157, UNIQEM 204, VKM Ac-528

Synonyms
- Actinomyces violaceus, Actinomyces violatus, Cladothrix violacea, Discomyces violaceus, Nocardia violacea,

Species of bacterium

Streptomyces violaceus is a bacterium species from the genus of Streptomyces which has been isolated from soil. Streptomyces violaceus produces rhodomycine, violamycin-B5 and violarin B.

== See also ==
- List of Streptomyces species
