= Streptomyces laculatispora =

Scientific classification
- Domain: Bacteria
- Kingdom: Bacillati
- Phylum: Actinomycetota
- Class: Actinomycetia
- Order: Streptomycetales
- Family: Streptomycetaceae
- Genus: Streptomyces
- Species: S. laculatispora

Binomial name
- Streptomyces laculatispora Zucchi et al. 2012

Type strain
- BK166, KACC 20907, NCIMB 14703

Species of bacterium

Streptomyces laculatispora is a bacterium species from the genus of Streptomyces which has been isolated from soil from the Cockle Park Experimantol Farm in Northumberland in the United Kingdom.

== See also ==
- List of Streptomyces species
