= Streptomyces yunnanensis =

Streptomyces yerevanensis

Scientific classification
- Domain: Bacteria
- Kingdom: Bacillati
- Phylum: Actinomycetota
- Class: Actinomycetes
- Order: Streptomycetales
- Family: Streptomycetaceae
- Genus: Streptomyces
- Species: S. yerevanensis

Binomial name
- Streptomyces yerevanensis Zhang et al. 2003

Type strain
- CGMCC 4.1004, DSM 41793, JCM 12115, NBRC 100781 YIM 41004

Species of bacterium

Streptomyces yunnanensis is a bacterium species from the genus of Streptomyces which has been isolated from soil from a suburb of Kunming in the Yunnan Province in China.

== See also ==
- List of Streptomyces species
