= Streptomyces tibetensis =

Scientific classification
- Domain: Bacteria
- Kingdom: Bacillati
- Phylum: Actinomycetota
- Class: Actinomycetia
- Order: Streptomycetales
- Family: Streptomycetaceae
- Genus: Streptomyces
- Species: S. tibetensis

Binomial name
- Streptomyces tibetensis Li et al. 2020

Type strain
- XZ 46

Species of bacterium

Streptomyces tibetensis is a bacterium species from the genus of Streptomyces which has been isolated from soil from the Tibetan Plateau in China.

== See also ==
- List of Streptomyces species
