= Streptomyces cheonanensis =

Scientific classification
- Domain: Bacteria
- Kingdom: Bacillati
- Phylum: Actinomycetota
- Class: Actinomycetes
- Order: Streptomycetales
- Family: Streptomycetaceae
- Genus: Streptomyces
- Species: S. cheonanensis

Binomial name
- Streptomyces cheonanensis Kim et al. 2006

Type strain
- DSM 41865, JCM 14549, KCCM 42119, NBRC 100940, VC-A46

Species of bacterium

Streptomyces cheonanensis is a bacterium species from the genus of Streptomyces which has been isolated from radish growing soil in Cheonan in Korea.

== See also ==
- List of Streptomyces species
