= Streptomyces kronopolitis =

Scientific classification
- Domain: Bacteria
- Kingdom: Bacillati
- Phylum: Actinomycetota
- Class: Actinomycetia
- Order: Streptomycetales
- Family: Streptomycetaceae
- Genus: Streptomyces
- Species: S. kronopolitis

Binomial name
- Streptomyces kronopolitis Liu et al. 2016

Type strain
- CGMCC 4.7323, DSM 101986, NEAU-ML8

Species of bacterium

Streptomyces kronopolitis is a bacterium species from the genus of Streptomyces which has been isolated from the millipede Kronopolites svenhedind from the Fenghuang Mountain in China.Streptomyces kronopolitis produces phoslactomycins.

== See also ==
- List of Streptomyces species
