= Streptomyces dengpaensis =

Scientific classification
- Domain: Bacteria
- Kingdom: Bacillati
- Phylum: Actinomycetota
- Class: Actinomycetia
- Order: Streptomycetales
- Family: Streptomycetaceae
- Genus: Streptomyces
- Species: S. dengpaensis

Binomial name
- Streptomyces dengpaensis Li et al. 2018

Type strain
- XZHG99

Species of bacterium

Streptomyces dengpaensis is a bacterium species from the genus of Streptomyces which has been isolated from desert soil from the Dengpa District in Tibet.

== See also ==
- List of Streptomyces species
