= Streptomyces spiralis =

Scientific classification
- Domain: Bacteria
- Kingdom: Bacillati
- Phylum: Actinomycetota
- Class: Actinomycetes
- Order: Streptomycetales
- Family: Streptomycetaceae
- Genus: Streptomyces
- Species: S. spiralis

Binomial name
- Streptomyces spiralis Goodfellow et al. 1986

Type strain
- AS 4.1764, AS 4.1852, ATCC 25664, C9A, C9A-IBc, CGMCC 4.1764, CGMCC 4.1852, DSM 43836, IFO 14215, JCM 3302, KCC 3302, KCC A-0302, KCTC 9849, MTCC 501, NBRC 14215, NRRL B-16922, VKM Ac-1311

Synonyms
- Elytrosporangium spirale

Species of bacterium

Streptomyces spiralis is a bacterium species from the genus of Streptomyces which has been isolated from soil in Brazil.

== See also ==
- List of Streptomyces species
