= Streptomyces hyderabadensis =

Scientific classification
- Domain: Bacteria
- Kingdom: Bacillati
- Phylum: Actinomycetota
- Class: Actinomycetes
- Order: Streptomycetales
- Family: Streptomycetaceae
- Genus: Streptomyces
- Species: S. aidingensis

Binomial name
- Streptomyces aidingensis Reddy et al. 2011

Type strain
- CCTCC AA 209024, JCM 17657, OU-40, PCM 2692

Species of bacterium

Streptomyces hyderabadensis is a bacterium species from the genus of Streptomyces which has been isolated from farm soil in Andhra Pradesh in India.

== See also ==
- List of Streptomyces species
