= Streptomyces thermospinosisporus =

Scientific classification
- Domain: Bacteria
- Kingdom: Bacillati
- Phylum: Actinomycetota
- Class: Actinomycetes
- Order: Streptomycetales
- Family: Streptomycetaceae
- Genus: Streptomyces
- Species: S. thermospinosisporus

Binomial name
- Streptomyces thermospinosisporus Kim and Goodfellow 2002

Type strain
- AT10, BCRC 16367, CCRC 16367, DSM 41779, JCM 11756, KCTC 9909, NBRC 100043, NRRL B-24318

Synonyms
- Streptomyces thermospinisporus

Species of bacterium

Streptomyces thermospinosisporus is a bacterium species from the genus of Streptomyces which has been isolated from garden soil in the United Kingdom.

== See also ==
- List of Streptomyces species
