= Streptomyces jeddahensis =

Scientific classification
- Domain: Bacteria
- Kingdom: Bacillati
- Phylum: Actinomycetota
- Class: Actinomycetia
- Order: Streptomycetales
- Family: Streptomycetaceae
- Genus: Streptomyces
- Species: S. jeddahensis

Binomial name
- Streptomyces jeddahensis Röttig et al. 2017

Type strain
- DSM 101878, LMG 29545, NCCB 100603, G25

Species of bacterium

Streptomyces jeddahensis is a bacterium species from the genus of Streptomyces which has been isolated from arid soil from Saudi Arabia.

== See also ==
- List of Streptomyces species
