= Streptomyces lushanensis =

Scientific classification
- Domain: Bacteria
- Kingdom: Bacillati
- Phylum: Actinomycetota
- Class: Actinomycetia
- Order: Streptomycetales
- Family: Streptomycetaceae
- Genus: Streptomyces
- Species: S. lushanensis

Binomial name
- Streptomyces lushanensis Zhang et al. 2015

Type strain
- DSM 42121, JCM 19628, KACC 17834, KCTC 29261, NRRL B-24994, JXJ 0135

Species of bacterium

Streptomyces lushanensis is a bacterium species from the genus of Streptomyces which has been isolated from soil from the Lushan Mountain in China. Streptomyces lushanensis has antibacterial activity.

== See also ==
- List of Streptomyces species
