= Streptomyces arcticus =

Scientific classification
- Domain: Bacteria
- Kingdom: Bacillati
- Phylum: Actinomycetota
- Class: Actinomycetia
- Order: Streptomycetales
- Family: Streptomycetaceae
- Genus: Streptomyces
- Species: S. arcticus

Binomial name
- Streptomyces arcticus Zhang et al. 2016

Type strain
- CCTCC AA 2015005, DSM 100713, ZLN234

Species of Actinobacteria

Streptomyces arcticus is a bacterium species from the genus Streptomyces which has been isolated from frozen soil from a glacier from the High Arctic.

== See also ==
- List of Streptomyces species
