= Streptomyces hainanensis =

Scientific classification
- Domain: Bacteria
- Kingdom: Bacillati
- Phylum: Actinomycetota
- Class: Actinomycetes
- Order: Streptomycetales
- Family: Streptomycetaceae
- Genus: Streptomyces
- Species: S. hainanensis

Binomial name
- Streptomyces hainanensis Jiang et al. 2007

Type strain
- CCTCC AA 205017, DSM 41900, JCM 15129, YIM 47672

Species of bacterium

Streptomyces hainanensis is a bacterium species from the genus of Streptomyces which has been isolated from soil in from the island Hainan in China.

== See also ==
- List of Streptomyces species
