= Streptomyces mangrovi =

Scientific classification
- Domain: Bacteria
- Kingdom: Bacillati
- Phylum: Actinomycetota
- Class: Actinomycetia
- Order: Streptomycetales
- Family: Streptomycetaceae
- Genus: Streptomyces
- Species: S. mangrovi

Binomial name
- Streptomyces mangrovi Wang et al. 2015

Type strain
- GY1

Species of bacterium

Streptomyces mangrovi is a bacterium species from the genus of Streptomyces which has been isolated from mangrove soil from the Dongzhaigang National Nature Reserve from the Haikou City, in China.

== See also ==
- List of Streptomyces species
