= Streptomyces acidicola =

Scientific classification
- Domain: Bacteria
- Kingdom: Bacillati
- Phylum: Actinomycetota
- Class: Actinomycetes
- Order: Streptomycetales
- Family: Streptomycetaceae
- Genus: Streptomyces
- Species: S. acidicola

Binomial name
- Streptomyces acidicola Lipun et al. 2020

Type strain
- K1PN6

Species of bacterium

Streptomyces acidicola is a bacterium species from the genus Streptomyces which has been isolated from soil from the Kantulee peat swamp forest from the Surat Thani province in Thailand.

== See also ==
- List of Streptomyces species
