= Streptomyces naganishii =

Scientific classification
- Domain: Bacteria
- Kingdom: Bacillati
- Phylum: Actinomycetota
- Class: Actinomycetia
- Order: Streptomycetales
- Family: Streptomycetaceae
- Genus: Streptomyces
- Species: S. naganishii

Binomial name
- Streptomyces naganishii Yamaguchi and Saburi 1955

Type strain
- ATCC 23939, BCRC 15130, CBS 923.68, CCRC 15130, DSM 40282, ETH 24127, H-4871, IFO 12892, ISP 5282, JCM 4190, JCM 4654, NBRC 12892, NRRL B-1816, NRRL-ISP 5282, RIA 1196, Yamaguchi H-4871

Species of bacterium

Streptomyces naganishii is a bacterium species from the genus of Streptomyces which has been isolated from soil in Japan.

== See also ==
- List of Streptomyces species
