= Streptomyces torulosus =

Scientific classification
- Domain: Bacteria
- Kingdom: Bacillati
- Phylum: Actinomycetota
- Class: Actinomycetes
- Order: Streptomycetales
- Family: Streptomycetaceae
- Genus: Streptomyces
- Species: S. torulosus

Binomial name
- Streptomyces torulosus Lyons and Pridham 1971

Type strain
- ATCC 29340, B-3889, CBS 801.71, CGMCC 4.1787, DSM 40894, DSM 41249, F-57, IFM 1283, IFO 15460, IMRU 3950, JCM 4872, KCC S-0872, LMG 20305, MTCC 1826, NBRC 15460, NRRL B-3889, NRRL S-124, S-0872, S-124, S-124 (F-57), Waksman 3950

Species of bacterium

Streptomyces torulosus is a bacterium species from the genus of Streptomyces which has been isolated from soil.

== See also ==
- List of Streptomyces species
