= Streptomyces tauricus =

Scientific classification
- Domain: Bacteria
- Kingdom: Bacillati
- Phylum: Actinomycetota
- Class: Actinomycetes
- Order: Streptomycetales
- Family: Streptomycetaceae
- Genus: Streptomyces
- Species: S. tauricus

Binomial name
- Streptomyces tauricus Sveshnikova 1986

Type strain
- ATCC 27470, BCC 7126, BCRC 12822, CBS 757.72, CCRC 12822, CGMCC 4.1794, CGMCC 4.2076, DSM 40560, IFO 13456, IMET 43541, INA 8173, ISP 5560, JCM 4837, KCC S-0837, LMG 20301, MTCC 1823, NBRC 13456, NRRL B-12497, NRRL-ISP 5560, RIA 1417, VKM Ac-1853

Synonyms
- Actinomyces tauricus

Species of bacterium

Streptomyces tauricus is a bacterium species from the genus of Streptomyces. Streptomyces tauricus produces tauromycetin.

== See also ==
- List of Streptomyces species
