= Streptomyces griseomycini =

Scientific classification
- Domain: Bacteria
- Kingdom: Bacillati
- Phylum: Actinomycetota
- Class: Actinomycetes
- Order: Streptomycetales
- Family: Streptomycetaceae
- Genus: Streptomyces
- Species: S. griseomycini

Binomial name
- Streptomyces griseomycini (Preobrazhenskaya et al. 1957) Pridham et al. 1958 (Approved Lists 1980)

Type strain
- ATCC 19765, ATCC 23625, BCRC 13763, CBS 503.68, CCRC 13763, DSM 40159, IFO 12778, INA 13984, ISP 5159, JCM 4382, KCC S-0382, KCCS-0382, NBRC 12778, NCIB 9845, NCIMB 9845, NRRL B-5421, NRRL-ISP 5159, RIA 1045, UNIQEM 151

Synonyms
- "Actinomyces griseomycini" Preobrazhenskaya et al. 1957

Species of bacterium

Streptomyces griseomycini is a bacterium species from the genus of Streptomyces which has been isolated from soil.

== See also ==
- List of Streptomyces species
