= Streptomyces harenosi =

Scientific classification
- Domain: Bacteria
- Kingdom: Bacillati
- Phylum: Actinomycetota
- Class: Actinomycetia
- Order: Streptomycetales
- Family: Streptomycetaceae
- Genus: Streptomyces
- Species: S. harenosi

Binomial name
- Streptomyces harenosi Kusuma et al. 2020

Type strain
- PRKS01-65

Species of bacterium

Streptomyces harenosi is a bacterium species from the genus of Streptomyces which has been isolated from soil from Parangkusumo, Indonesia.

== See also ==
- List of Streptomyces species
