= Streptomyces albiflavescens =

Scientific classification
- Domain: Bacteria
- Kingdom: Bacillati
- Phylum: Actinomycetota
- Class: Actinomycetia
- Order: Streptomycetales
- Family: Streptomycetaceae
- Genus: Streptomyces
- Species: S. albiflavescens

Binomial name
- Streptomyces albiflavescens Han et al. 2015

Type strain
- CGMCC 4.7111, KCTC 29196, strain m20

Species of bacterium

Streptomyces albiflavescens is a bacterium species from the genus Streptomyces which has been isolated from soil from rainforest areas in the Yunnan Province in the south west of China.

== See also ==
- List of Streptomyces species
