= Streptomyces dysideae =

Scientific classification
- Domain: Bacteria
- Kingdom: Bacillati
- Phylum: Actinomycetota
- Class: Actinomycetia
- Order: Streptomycetales
- Family: Streptomycetaceae
- Genus: Streptomyces
- Species: S. dysideae

Binomial name
- Streptomyces dysideae Glaeser et al. 2021

Type strain
- RV15

Species of bacterium

Streptomyces dysideae is a Gram-positive bacterium species from the genus of Streptomyces which has been isolated from the sponge Dysidea tupha from Rovinj.

== See also ==
- List of Streptomyces species
