= Streptomyces griseoincarnatus =

Scientific classification
- Domain: Bacteria
- Kingdom: Bacillati
- Phylum: Actinomycetota
- Class: Actinomycetes
- Order: Streptomycetales
- Family: Streptomycetaceae
- Genus: Streptomyces
- Species: S. griseoincarnatus

Binomial name
- Streptomyces griseoincarnatus (Preobrazhenskaya et al. 1957) Pridham et al. 1958 (Approved Lists 1980)

Type strain
- 12871 INA, 9673/55, AS 4.1409, ATCC 23623, ATCC 23917, BCRC 11481, CBS 838.68, CBS 838.68 IFO, CCRC 11481, CGMCC 4.1409, DSM 40274, IFO 12871, INA 9673/55, ISP 5274, JCM 4381, KCC S-0381, KCCS-0381, KCTC 19071, Lanoot R-8677, LMG 19316, NBRC 12871, NCIB 9825, NCIMB 9825, NRRL B-5313, NRRL-ISP 5274, R-8677, RIA 1192, VTT E-022184

Synonyms
- Actinomyces griseoincarnatus: "Actinomyces griseoincarnatus" Preobrazhenskaya et al. 1957; "Actinomyces variabilis" Preobrazhenskaya et al. 1957; Streptomyces erythrogriseus Falcão de Morais and Dália Maia 1959 (Approved Lists 1980); Streptomyces variabilis (Preobrazhenskaya et al. 1957) Pridham et al. 1958 (Approved Lists 1980)

Species of bacterium

Streptomyces griseoincarnatus is a bacterium species from the genus of Streptomyces which has been isolated from soil in Russia. Streptomyces griseoincarnatus produces erygrisin. Streptomyces griseoincarnatus produces variapeptin, citropeptin, and ammosamide D.

== See also ==
- List of Streptomyces species
