= Streptomyces paucisporeus =

Scientific classification
- Domain: Bacteria
- Kingdom: Bacillati
- Phylum: Actinomycetota
- Class: Actinomycetes
- Order: Streptomycetales
- Family: Streptomycetaceae
- Genus: Streptomyces
- Species: S. paucisporeus

Binomial name
- Streptomyces paucisporeus Xu et al. 2006

Type strain
- CGMCC 4.2025, JCM 13276, NBRC 102072, strain 1413

Species of bacterium

Streptomyces paucisporeus is a bacterium species from the genus of Streptomyces which has been isolated from acidic soil from the Yunnan Province in China.

== See also ==
- List of Streptomyces species
