= Streptomyces shaanxiensis =

Scientific classification
- Domain: Bacteria
- Kingdom: Bacillati
- Phylum: Actinomycetota
- Class: Actinomycetia
- Order: Streptomycetales
- Family: Streptomycetaceae
- Genus: Streptomyces
- Species: S. shaanxiensis

Binomial name
- Streptomyces shaanxiensis Lin et al. 2012

Type strain
- ACCC 41873, CCNWHQ 0031, CCNWTJ 0031, JCM 16925

Species of bacterium

Streptomyces shaanxiensis is a blue pigmented bacterium species from the genus of Streptomyces which has been isolated from a sewage irrigation area in the Shaanxii province in China.

== See also ==
- List of Streptomyces species
