= Streptomyces violaceolatus =

Scientific classification
- Domain: Bacteria
- Kingdom: Bacillati
- Phylum: Actinomycetota
- Class: Actinomycetes
- Order: Streptomycetales
- Family: Streptomycetaceae
- Genus: Streptomyces
- Species: S. violaceolatus

Binomial name
- Streptomyces violaceolatus Pridham 1970

Type strain
- ATCC 19847, ATCC 25513, BCRC 16249, CBS 655.69, CCRC 16249, CGMCC 4.1756, DSM 40438, ICSSB 1022, IFO 13101, INMI 4, ISP 5438, JCM 4531, KCC S-0531, KCCM 40045, KCTC 9772, NBRC 13101, NRRL B-12371, NRRL-ISP 5438, RIA 1293, VKM Ac-58

Synonyms
- Actinomyces violaceolatus

Species of bacterium

Streptomyces violaceolatus is a bacterium species from the genus of Streptomyces.

== See also ==
- List of Streptomyces species
