= Streptomyces ramulosus =

Scientific classification
- Domain: Bacteria
- Kingdom: Bacillati
- Phylum: Actinomycetota
- Class: Actinomycetes
- Order: Streptomycetales
- Family: Streptomycetaceae
- Genus: Streptomyces
- Species: S. ramulosus

Binomial name
- Streptomyces ramulosus Ettlinger et al. 1958

Type strain
- AS 4.1434, ATCC 19802, BCRC 12343, CBS 554.68, CCRC 12343, CGMCC 4.1434, CUB 516, DSM 40100, ETH 17653, HAMBI 981, ICMP 143, IFO 12812, IFO 15798, ISP 5100, JCM 4193, JCM 4604, KCC S-0193, KCC S-0604, KCCM 40118, KCTC 9768, Lanoot R-8719, LMG 19354, NBRC 12812, NBRC 15798, NRRL B-2714, NRRL-ISP 5100, NZRCC 10341, R-8719, RIA 1081, UNIQEM 188, VKM Ac-1001

Species of bacterium

Streptomyces ramulosus is a bacterium species from the genus of Streptomyces which has been isolated from soil. Streptomyces ramulosus produces acetomycin, beta-oxotryptamine, oxyplicacetin and pepsinostreptin.

== See also ==
- List of Streptomyces species
