= Streptomyces asterosporus =

Scientific classification
- Domain: Bacteria
- Kingdom: Bacillati
- Phylum: Actinomycetota
- Class: Actinomycetia
- Order: Streptomycetales
- Family: Streptomycetaceae
- Genus: Streptomyces
- Species: S. asterosporus

Binomial name
- Streptomyces asterosporus ex Krassilnikov 1970) Preobrazhenskaya 1986

Type strain
- AS 4.1605, BCRC 16848, CCRC 16848, CGMCC 4.1605, DSM 41452, IFO 15872, INMI 16, JCM 6912, NBRC 15872, NRRL B-24328, VKM 40, VKM Ac-40

Synonyms
- Actinomyces asterosporus

Species of bacterium

Streptomyces asterosporus is a bacterium species from the genus Streptomyces.

== See also ==
- List of Streptomyces species
