= Streptomyces salilacus =

Scientific classification
- Domain: Bacteria
- Kingdom: Bacillati
- Phylum: Actinomycetota
- Class: Actinomycetia
- Order: Streptomycetales
- Family: Streptomycetaceae
- Genus: Streptomyces
- Species: S. salilacus

Binomial name
- Streptomyces salilacus Luo et al. 2018

Species of bacterium

Streptomyces salilacus is a bacterium species from the genus of Streptomyces which has been isolated from the Xiaoerkule Lake from Xinjiang in China.

== See also ==
- List of Streptomyces species
