= Streptomyces minutiscleroticus =

Scientific classification
- Domain: Bacteria
- Kingdom: Bacillati
- Phylum: Actinomycetota
- Class: Actinomycetes
- Order: Streptomycetales
- Family: Streptomycetaceae
- Genus: Streptomyces
- Species: S. minutiscleroticus

Binomial name
- Streptomyces minutiscleroticus (Thirumalachar 1965) Pridham 1970 (Approved Lists 1980)

Type strain
- ATCC 17757, ATCC 19346, BCRC 12544, CBS 231.65, CBS 662.72, CCRC 12544, CGMCC 4.1981, CMI 112786, DSM 40301, HACC 147, IFO 13000, IFO 13361, IMI 112786, ISP 5301, JCM 3102, JCM 4790, KCTC 9123, LMG 20062, NBRC 13000, NBRC 13361, NCIB 10996, NCIMB 10996, NRRL B-12202, NRRL-ISP 5301, PCM 2304, RIA 1322, RIA 885, UAMH 6128

Synonyms (Note: Lanoot et al. (2005) declared Chainia flava Thirumalachar and Sukapure 1964 (Approved Lists 1980) and Streptomyces flaviscleroticus (ex Pridham 1970) Goodfellow et al. 1986 as synonyms of Streptomyces minutiscleroticus (Thirumalachar 1965) Pridham 1970 (Approved Lists 1980), but this would be in violation of the rules of the Bacteriological Code. In case of synonymy, the name Streptomyces flaviscleroticus (ex Pridham 1970) Goodfellow et al. 1986 would have priority.)
- Chainia minutisclerotica Thirumalachar 1965 (Approved Lists 1980)

Species of bacterium

Streptomyces minutiscleroticus is a bacterium species from the genus of Streptomyces. Streptomyces minutiscleroticus produces the antibiotic aburamycin.

== See also ==
- List of Streptomyces species
