= Streptomyces heliomycini =

Scientific classification
- Domain: Bacteria
- Kingdom: Bacillati
- Phylum: Actinomycetota
- Class: Actinomycetes
- Order: Streptomycetales
- Family: Streptomycetaceae
- Genus: Streptomyces
- Species: S. heliomycini

Binomial name
- Streptomyces heliomycini (ex Braznikova et al. 1958) Preobrazhenskaya 1986

Type strain
- DSM 41690, IFO 15899, INA 2915, JCM 9767, LMG 19960, NBRC 15899, VKM Ac-1778

Synonyms
- "Actinomyces flavochromogenes subsp. heliomycini" Braznikova et al. 1958

Species of bacterium

Streptomyces heliomycini is a bacterium species from the genus of Streptomyces which has been isolated from soil. Streptomyces heliomycini produces heliomycin.

== See also ==
- List of Streptomyces species
