= Streptomyces yerevanensis =

Scientific classification
- Domain: Bacteria
- Kingdom: Bacillati
- Phylum: Actinomycetota
- Class: Actinomycetes
- Order: Streptomycetales
- Family: Streptomycetaceae
- Genus: Streptomyces
- Species: S. yerevanensis

Binomial name
- Streptomyces yerevanensis Goodfellow et al. 1986

Synonyms
- Microellobosporia violacea Macrospora violaceus

Species of bacterium

Streptomyces yerevanensis is a bacterium species from the genus of Streptomyces which has been isolated from soil. Streptomyces yerevanensis produces violacin.

== See also ==
- List of Streptomyces species
