= Streptomyces fenghuangensis =

Scientific classification
- Domain: Bacteria
- Kingdom: Bacillati
- Phylum: Actinomycetota
- Class: Actinomycetia
- Order: Streptomycetales
- Family: Streptomycetaceae
- Genus: Streptomyces
- Species: S. fenghuangensis

Binomial name
- Streptomyces fenghuangensis Zhu et al. 2011

Type strain
- CCTCCM 208215, GIMN4.003, NRRL B-24801

Species of bacterium

Streptomyces fenghuangensis is a bacterium species from the genus of Streptomyces which has been isolated from seawater near Sanya in China.

== See also ==
- List of Streptomyces species
