= Streptomyces hirsutus =

Scientific classification
- Domain: Bacteria
- Kingdom: Bacillati
- Phylum: Actinomycetota
- Class: Actinomycetia
- Order: Streptomycetales
- Family: Streptomycetaceae
- Genus: Streptomyces
- Species: S. hirsutus

Binomial name
- Streptomyces hirsutus Ettlinger et al. 1958

Type strain
- ATCC 19773, BCRC 13676, CBS 511.68, CCRC 13676, CGMCC 4.1950, DSM 40095, ETH 1660, ETH 16660, HAMBI 1003, IFO 12786, IMET 42054, ISP 5095, JCM 4191, JCM 4587, NBRC 12786, NRRL B-2713, NRRL-ISP 5095, RIA 1053, UNIQEM 159, VKM Ac-623

Synonyms
- "Actinomyces cyanoalbus" Krassilnikov and Agre 1960; Streptomyces cyanoalbus (Krassilnikov and Agre 1960) Pridham 1970 (Approved Lists 1980)

Species of bacterium

Streptomyces hirsutus is a bacterium species from the genus of Streptomyces which has been isolated from soil in Switzerland. Streptomyces hirsutus produces prasinomycin and 8-deoxychalcomycin.

== See also ==
- List of Streptomyces species
