= Streptomyces siamensis =

Scientific classification
- Domain: Bacteria
- Kingdom: Bacillati
- Phylum: Actinomycetota
- Class: Actinomycetia
- Order: Streptomycetales
- Family: Streptomycetaceae
- Genus: Streptomyces
- Species: S. siamensis

Binomial name
- Streptomyces siamensis Sripreechasak et al. 2016

Type strain
- NBRC 108799, PCU 328, KC-031, KC-038, TISTR 2107

Species of bacterium

Streptomyces siamensis is a bacterium species from the genus of Streptomyces which has been isolated from soil from Thailand.

== See also ==
- List of Streptomyces species
