= Streptomyces xanthochromogenes =

Scientific classification
- Domain: Bacteria
- Kingdom: Bacillati
- Phylum: Actinomycetota
- Class: Actinomycetes
- Order: Streptomycetales
- Family: Streptomycetaceae
- Genus: Streptomyces
- Species: S. xanthochromogenes

Binomial name
- Streptomyces xanthochromogenes Arishima et al. 1956

Type strain
- AS 4.1435, ATCC 19818, BCRC 11876, CBS 571.68, CCRC 11876, CGMCC 4.1435, DSM 2015, DSM 40111, IFO 12828, ISP 5111, JCM 4215, JCM 4612, Kaisha 689, KCC S-0215, KCC S-0612, KCTC 19954, Lanoot R-8732, LMG 19366, NBRC 12828, NIHJ 196, NRRL B-5410, NRRL-ISP 5111, QMC 1607, R-8732, RIA 1098, UNIQEM 207, VKM Ac-1071

Species of bacterium

Streptomyces xanthochromogenes is a bacterium species from the genus of Streptomyces which has been isolated from soil in Japan. Streptomyces xanthochromogenes produces xanthicin.

== See also ==
- List of Streptomyces species
