= Streptomyces inusitatus =

Scientific classification
- Domain: Bacteria
- Kingdom: Bacillati
- Phylum: Actinomycetota
- Class: Actinomycetes
- Order: Streptomycetales
- Family: Streptomycetaceae
- Genus: Streptomyces
- Species: S. inusitatus

Binomial name
- Streptomyces inusitatus Hasegawa et al. 1978 (Approved Lists 1980)

Type strain
- ATCC 33341, CBS 196.78, DSM 41441, Hasegawa T-41575, IFO 13601, JCM 4988, KCC S-0988, LMG 19955, NBRC 13601, NRRL B-16929, T-41575

Species of bacterium

Streptomyces inusitatus is a bacterium species from the genus of Streptomyces which has been isolated from soil. Streptomyces inusitatus produces oxamycetin.

== See also ==
- List of Streptomyces species
