= Streptomyces yokosukanensis =

Scientific classification
- Domain: Bacteria
- Kingdom: Bacillati
- Phylum: Actinomycetota
- Class: Actinomycetia
- Order: Streptomycetales
- Family: Streptomycetaceae
- Genus: Streptomyces
- Species: S. yokosukanensis

Binomial name
- Streptomyces yokosukanensis Nakamura 1961

Type strain
- ATCC 25520, B-34, BCRC 11875, CBS 277.65, CBS 662.69, CCRC 11875, DSM 40224, IFO 13108, IPCR B-34, ISP 5224, JCM 4137, JCM 4559, NBRC 13108, NRRL B-3353, NRRL-ISP 5224, RIA 1300, VKM Ac-1713

Species of bacterium

Streptomyces yokosukanensis is a bacterium species from the genus of Streptomyces which has been isolated from soil in Japan. Streptomyces yokosukanensis produces neburalin.

== See also ==
- List of Streptomyces species
