= Streptomyces daqingensis =

Scientific classification
- Domain: Bacteria
- Kingdom: Bacillati
- Phylum: Actinomycetota
- Class: Actinomycetia
- Order: Streptomycetales
- Family: Streptomycetaceae
- Genus: Streptomyces
- Species: S. daqingensis

Binomial name
- Streptomyces daqingensis Pan et al. 2016

Type strain
- CGMCC 4.7178, JCM 30057, NEAU-ZJC8

Species of bacterium

Streptomyces daqingensis is a bacterium species from the genus of Streptomyces which has been isolated from saline-alkaline soil in Heilongjiang in China.

== See also ==
- List of Streptomyces species
