= Streptomyces gancidicus =

Scientific classification
- Domain: Bacteria
- Kingdom: Bacillati
- Phylum: Actinomycetota
- Class: Actinomycetia
- Order: Streptomycetales
- Family: Streptomycetaceae
- Genus: Streptomyces
- Species: S. gancidicus

Binomial name
- Streptomyces gancidicus Suzuki 1957

Type strain
- CGMCC 4.1971, DSM 40935, IFM 1024, IFM 1024 (AAK-84), IFO 15412, JCM 4171, KCC S-0171, KCCS-0171, KCTC 19062, NBRC 15412, NCIMB 12858, NRRL B-1872

Species of bacterium

Streptomyces gancidicus is a bacterium species from the genus of Streptomyces. Streptomyces gancidicus produces cyclo(leucylpropyl) and the gancidin-complex.

== See also ==
- List of Streptomyces species
