= Streptomyces vastus =

Scientific classification
- Domain: Bacteria
- Kingdom: Bacillati
- Phylum: Actinomycetota
- Class: Actinomycetes
- Order: Streptomycetales
- Family: Streptomycetaceae
- Genus: Streptomyces
- Species: S. vastus

Binomial name
- Streptomyces vastus Szabó and Marton 1958

Type strain
- A-10, ATCC 25506, BCRC 15139, CBS 290.60, CBS 290/60, CBS 648.69, CCRC 15139, DSM 40309, ETH 2647, IFO 13094, ISP 5309, JCM 4524, MTCC 1536, NBRC 13094, NRRL B-12232, NRRL-ISP 5309, RIA 1286, Szabo A-10, VKM Ac-1871

Species of bacterium

Streptomyces vastus is a bacterium species from the genus of Streptomyces.

== See also ==
- List of Streptomyces species
