= Streptomyces paradoxus =

Scientific classification
- Domain: Bacteria
- Kingdom: Bacillati
- Phylum: Actinomycetota
- Class: Actinomycetes
- Order: Streptomycetales
- Family: Streptomycetaceae
- Genus: Streptomyces
- Species: S. paradoxus

Binomial name
- Streptomyces paradoxus Goodfellow et al. 1986

Type strain
- ATCC 15813, BCRC 12521, CCRC 12521, CGMCC 4.1190, CGMCC 4.2008, DSM 43350, IFM 1160, IFO 14887, IMET 43491, INMI 3180, JCM 3052, KCC 3052, KCC A-0052, KCTC 9118, NBRC 14887, NRRL B-3457, NRRL B-3483, NRRL B-B-3483, PCM 2310, RIA 655, VKM Ac-645

Synonyms
- Actinosporangium violaceum

Species of bacterium

Streptomyces paradoxus is a bacterium species from the genus of Streptomyces which has been isolated from soil from Russia. Actinosporangium violaceum was transferred to Streptomyces paradoxus.

== See also ==
- List of Streptomyces species
