= Streptomyces gulbargensis =

Scientific classification
- Domain: Bacteria
- Kingdom: Bacillati
- Phylum: Actinomycetota
- Class: Actinomycetia
- Order: Streptomycetales
- Family: Streptomycetaceae
- Genus: Streptomyces
- Species: S. gulbargensis

Binomial name
- Streptomyces gulbargensis Dastager et al. 2009

Type strain
- CCTCC AA 206001, DAS 131, JCM 16956, KCTC 19179

Species of bacterium

Streptomyces gulbargensis is an alkalitolerant and thermotolerant bacterium species from the genus of Streptomyces which has been isolated from soil from Gulbarga in the Karnataka in India.

== See also ==
- List of Streptomyces species
