= Streptomyces pharetrae =

Scientific classification
- Domain: Bacteria
- Kingdom: Bacillati
- Phylum: Actinomycetota
- Class: Actinomycetes
- Order: Streptomycetales
- Family: Streptomycetaceae
- Genus: Streptomyces
- Species: S. pharetrae

Binomial name
- Streptomyces pharetrae Le Roes and Meyers 2005

Type strain
- CZA14, DSM 41856, JCM 13860, NRRL B-24333

Species of Actinobacteria

Streptomyces pharetrae is a bacterium species from the genus of Streptomyces which has been isolated from soil from the Western Cape Province in South Africa.

== See also ==
- List of Streptomyces species
