= Streptomyces sanglieri =

Scientific classification
- Domain: Bacteria
- Kingdom: Bacillati
- Phylum: Actinomycetota
- Class: Actinomycetes
- Order: Streptomycetales
- Family: Streptomycetaceae
- Genus: Streptomyces
- Species: S. sanglieri

Binomial name
- Streptomyces sanglieri Manfio et al. 2003

Type strain
- A46R51, CGMCC 4.1831, CIP 108189, DSM 41791, JCM 12607, NBRC 100784, NCIMB 13929, NRRL B-24279

Species of bacterium

Streptomyces sanglieri is a bacterium species from the genus of Streptomyces which has been isolated from soil from a hay meadow. Streptomyces sanglieri produces the antibiotic lactonamycin Z.

== See also ==
- List of Streptomyces species
