= Streptomyces coeruleofuscus =

Scientific classification
- Domain: Bacteria
- Kingdom: Bacillati
- Phylum: Actinomycetota
- Class: Actinomycetes
- Order: Streptomycetales
- Family: Streptomycetaceae
- Genus: Streptomyces
- Species: S. coeruleofuscus

Binomial name
- Streptomyces coeruleofuscus (Preobrazhenskaya 1957) Pridham et al. 1958 (Approved Lists 1980)

Type strain
- AS 4.1667, ATCC 19741, ATCC 23618, BCRC 12186, CBS 480.68, CCRC 12186, CGMCC 4.1667, DSM 40144, IFO 12757, IMET 43574, INA 2922, INA 2922/57, ISP 5144, JCM 4358, KCC S-0358, NBRC 12757, NRRL B-5417, NRRL-ISP 5144, RIA 1022, UNIQEM 128, VKM Ac-619

Synonyms
- "Actinomyces coeruleofuscus" Preobrazhenskaya 1957

Species of bacterium

Streptomyces coeruleofuscus is a bacterium species from the genus of Streptomyces which has been isolated from soil in Daghestan.

== See also ==
- List of Streptomyces species
