= Streptomyces roseoviolaceus =

Scientific classification
- Domain: Bacteria
- Kingdom: Bacillati
- Phylum: Actinomycetota
- Class: Actinomycetia
- Order: Streptomycetales
- Family: Streptomycetaceae
- Genus: Streptomyces
- Species: S. roseoviolaceus

Binomial name
- Streptomyces roseoviolaceus (Sveshnikova, 1957) Pridham et al., 1958

Type strain
- 1020/54, AS 4.1870, ATCC 25493, BCC 7098, BCRC 15128, CBS 953.69, CCRC 15128, CCT 5012, CGMCC 4.1870, DSM 40277, IFO 13081, INA 1020, INA 1020/54, ISP 5277, JCM 4513, KCC S-0513, KCCM 40020, KCTC 9769, LMG 8594, NBRC 13081, NRRL B-12177, NRRL-ISP 5277, RIA 1273, VKM Ac-1901

Synonyms
- Actinomyces roseoviolaceus

Species of bacterium

Streptomyces roseoviolaceus is a bacterium species from the genus of Streptomyces which has been isolated from soil.

== See also ==
- List of Streptomyces species
