= Streptomyces levis =

Scientific classification
- Domain: Bacteria
- Kingdom: Bacillati
- Phylum: Actinomycetota
- Class: Actinomycetes
- Order: Streptomycetales
- Family: Streptomycetaceae
- Genus: Streptomyces
- Species: S. levis

Binomial name
- Streptomyces levis Sveshnikova 1986

Type strain
- ATCC 43686, DSM 41458, IFO 15423, INA 9020, JCM 6924, NBRC 15423, NRRL B-16370, VKM 835, VKM Ac-835

Species of bacterium

Streptomyces levis is a bacterium species from the genus of Streptomyces.

== See also ==
- List of Streptomyces species
