= Streptomyces gilvifuscus =

Scientific classification
- Domain: Bacteria
- Kingdom: Bacillati
- Phylum: Actinomycetota
- Class: Actinomycetia
- Order: Streptomycetales
- Family: Streptomycetaceae
- Genus: Streptomyces
- Species: S. gilvifuscus

Binomial name
- Streptomyces gilvifuscus Nguyen et al. 2015

Type strain
- KACC 18248, KEMB 9005-213, NBRC 110904, T113

Species of bacterium

Streptomyces gilvifuscus is a Gram-positive and aerobic bacterium species from the genus of Streptomyces which has been isolated from forest soil in Pyeongchang-gun in Korea. Streptomyces gilvifuscus produces antibacterial compounds.

== See also ==
- List of Streptomyces species
