= Streptomyces cinnabarigriseus =

Scientific classification
- Domain: Bacteria
- Kingdom: Bacillati
- Phylum: Actinomycetota
- Class: Actinomycetia
- Order: Streptomycetales
- Family: Streptomycetaceae
- Genus: Streptomyces
- Species: S. cinnabarigriseus

Binomial name
- Streptomyces cinnabarigriseus Landwehr et al. 2018

Type strain
- DSM 101724, NCCB 100590, JS360

Species of bacterium

Streptomyces cinnabarigriseus is a bacterium species from the genus of Streptomyces.

== See also ==
- List of Streptomyces species
