= Streptomyces fodineus =

Scientific classification
- Domain: Bacteria
- Kingdom: Bacillati
- Phylum: Actinomycetota
- Class: Actinomycetia
- Order: Streptomycetales
- Family: Streptomycetaceae
- Genus: Streptomyces
- Species: S. fodineus

Binomial name
- Streptomyces fodineus Kim et al. 2019

Type strain
- TW1S1

Species of bacterium

Streptomyces fodineus is a bacterium species from the genus of Streptomyces which has been isolated from soil from a mine. Streptomyces fodineus has antifungal properties.

== See also ==
- List of Streptomyces species
