= Streptomyces chlorus =

Scientific classification
- Domain: Bacteria
- Kingdom: Bacillati
- Phylum: Actinomycetota
- Class: Actinomycetia
- Order: Streptomycetales
- Family: Streptomycetaceae
- Genus: Streptomyces
- Species: S. chlorus

Binomial name
- Streptomyces chlorus Kim et al. 2013

Type strain
- CGMCC 4.5798, KACC 20902, BK125

Species of bacterium

Streptomyces chlorus is a bacterium species from the genus of Streptomyces which has been isolated from hay meadow soil from the Cockle Park Experimental Farm in Northumberland in the United Kingdom.

== See also ==
- List of Streptomyces species
