= Streptomyces lannensis =

Scientific classification
- Domain: Bacteria
- Kingdom: Bacillati
- Phylum: Actinomycetota
- Class: Actinomycetia
- Order: Streptomycetales
- Family: Streptomycetaceae
- Genus: Streptomyces
- Species: S. lannensis

Binomial name
- Streptomyces lannensis Promnuan et al. 2013

Type strain
- JCM 16578, TA4-8, TISTR 1982

Species of bacterium

Streptomyces lannensis is a bacterium species from the genus of Streptomyces which has been isolated from the bee Tetragonilla collina in the Chiang Mai Province in Thailand.

== See also ==
- List of Streptomyces species
