= Streptomyces viridis =

Scientific classification
- Domain: Bacteria
- Kingdom: Bacillati
- Phylum: Actinomycetota
- Class: Actinomycetia
- Order: Streptomycetales
- Family: Streptomycetaceae
- Genus: Streptomyces
- Species: S. viridis

Binomial name
- Streptomyces viridis Kim et al. 2013

Type strain
- ATCC 15732, BCRC 16224, CBS 674.72, CCRC 16224, DSM 40381, ETH 18404, IFO 13373, IPV 398, ISP 5381, JCM 4854, NBRC 13373, NRRL B-12320, RIA 1334, VKM Ac-630

Species of Actinobacteria

Streptomyces viridis is a bacterium species from the genus of Streptomyces which has been isolated from soil from a hay meadow.

== See also ==
- List of Streptomyces species
