= Streptomyces violaceorubidus =

Scientific classification
- Domain: Bacteria
- Kingdom: Bacillati
- Phylum: Actinomycetota
- Class: Actinomycetes
- Order: Streptomycetales
- Family: Streptomycetaceae
- Genus: Streptomyces
- Species: S. violaceorubidus

Binomial name
- Streptomyces violaceorubidus Terekhova 1986

Type strain
- ATCC 43697, CGMCC 4.1768, DSM 41478, IFO 15463, INA 770, JCM 6931, LMG 20319, NBRC 15463, NRRL B-16381, VKM Ac-1292

Species of bacterium

Streptomyces violaceorubidus is a bacterium species from the genus of Streptomyces.

== See also ==
- List of Streptomyces species
