= Streptomyces yanii =

Scientific classification
- Domain: Bacteria
- Kingdom: Bacillati
- Phylum: Actinomycetota
- Class: Actinomycetes
- Order: Streptomycetales
- Family: Streptomycetaceae
- Genus: Streptomyces
- Species: S. yanii

Binomial name
- Streptomyces yanii Liu et al. 2005

Type strain
- 80-133, AS 4.1146, CGMCC 4.1146, DSM 43887, IFO 14669, IMET 9750, JCM 3331, KCC A-0331, KCTC 9259, NBRC 14669, RIA 1947, VKM Ac-1269

Synonyms
- Microstreptospora cinerea, Streptomyces microstreptospora

Species of bacterium

Streptomyces yanii is a bacterium species from the genus of Streptomyces which has been isolated from mud.

== See also ==
- List of Streptomyces species
