= Streptomyces amritsarensis =

Scientific classification
- Domain: Bacteria
- Kingdom: Bacillati
- Phylum: Actinomycetota
- Class: Actinomycetia
- Order: Streptomycetales
- Family: Streptomycetaceae
- Genus: Streptomyces
- Species: S. amritsarensis

Binomial name
- Streptomyces amritsarensis Sharma et al. 2014

Type strain
- JCM 19660, MTCC 11845

Species of bacterium

Streptomyces amritsarensis is a bacterium species from the genus Streptomyces which has been isolated from soil from Punjab in India. Streptomyces amritsarensis has antimicrobial activity.

== See also ==
- List of Streptomyces species
