= Streptomyces helvaticus =

Scientific classification
- Domain: Bacteria
- Kingdom: Bacillati
- Phylum: Actinomycetota
- Class: Actinomycetes
- Order: Streptomycetales
- Family: Streptomycetaceae
- Genus: Streptomyces
- Species: S. helvaticus

Binomial name
- Streptomyces helvaticus (Krassilnikov et al. 1965) Pridham 1970 (Approved Lists 1980)

Type strain
- 1013B, ATCC 19841, BCRC 16245, CBS 683.72, CCRC 16245, CGMCC 4.1911, DSM 40431, IFO 13382, INA 1013 B, INMI 1013 B, INMI 1013-B, ISP 5431, JCM 4768, NBRC 13382, NRRL B-12365, NRRL-ISP 5431, RIA 1343, VKM Ac-192

Synonyms
- "Actinomyces helvaticus" Krassilnikov et al. 1965

Species of bacterium

Streptomyces helvaticus is a bacterium species from the genus of Streptomyces.

== See also ==
- List of Streptomyces species
