= Streptomyces xinghaiensis =

Scientific classification
- Domain: Bacteria
- Kingdom: Bacillati
- Phylum: Actinomycetota
- Class: Actinomycetes
- Order: Streptomycetales
- Family: Streptomycetaceae
- Genus: Streptomyces
- Species: S. xinghaiensis

Binomial name
- Streptomyces xinghaiensis Zhao et al. 2009

Type strain
- CCTCC AA 208049, JCM 16958, KCTC 19546, NRRL B-24674, S187

Species of bacterium

Streptomyces xinghaiensis is a bacterium species from the genus of Streptomyces which has been isolated from marine sediments from Xinghai Bay near Dalian in China.

== See also ==
- List of Streptomyces species
