= Streptomyces phaeofaciens =

Scientific classification
- Domain: Bacteria
- Kingdom: Bacillati
- Phylum: Actinomycetota
- Class: Actinomycetes
- Order: Streptomycetales
- Family: Streptomycetaceae
- Genus: Streptomyces
- Species: S. phaeofaciens

Binomial name
- Streptomyces phaeofaciens Waksman 1957

Type strain
- ATCC 15034, BCRC 16223, CBS 426.64, CBS 637.72, CBS 673.72, CCRC 16223, CGMCC 4.1984, DSM 40367, ETH 24332, ETH 28532, IFM 1177, IFO 13372, ISP 5367, JCM 4125, JCM 4814, NBRC 13372, NIHJ 226, NIHJ T-23, NRRL A-10063, NRRL B-1516, NRRL-ISP 5367, RIA 1333, RIA 75, VKM Ac-1865

Species of bacterium

Streptomyces phaeofaciens is a bacterium species from the genus of Streptomyces which has been isolated from soil. Streptomyces phaeofaciens produces phaeofacin.

== See also ==
- List of Streptomyces species
