= Streptomyces rubiginosohelvolus =

Scientific classification
- Domain: Bacteria
- Kingdom: Bacillati
- Phylum: Actinomycetota
- Class: Actinomycetes
- Order: Streptomycetales
- Family: Streptomycetaceae
- Genus: Streptomyces
- Species: S. rubiginosohelvolus

Binomial name
- Streptomyces rubiginosohelvolus Pridham et al. 1958

Type strain
- ATCC 19926, ATCC 23960, BCRC 13780, CBS 943.68, CCRC 13780, CGMCC 4.1752, DSM 40176, ETH 28494, IFO 12912, INA 10 \\/53, INA 10/53, ISP 5176, JCM 4415, KCC S-0415, KCTC 19970, NBRC 12912, NRRL B-5425, NRRL-ISP 5176, PSA 172, RIA 1136, VKM Ac-1072

Synonyms
- Actinomyces rubiginosohelvolus

Species of bacterium

Streptomyces rubiginosohelvolus is a bacterium species from the genus of Streptomyces which has been isolated from soil.

== See also ==
- List of Streptomyces species
