= Streptomyces recifensis =

Scientific classification
- Domain: Bacteria
- Kingdom: Bacillati
- Phylum: Actinomycetota
- Class: Actinomycetia
- Order: Streptomycetales
- Family: Streptomycetaceae
- Genus: Streptomyces
- Species: S. recifensis

Binomial name
- Streptomyces recifensis Falcão de Morais et al. 1957

Type strain
- ATCC 19803, BCRC 12086, CBS 555.68, CCRC 12086

Synonyms
- Nocardia recifei

Species of Actinobacteria

Streptomyces recifensis is a bacterium species from the genus of Streptomyces which has been isolated from soil from Recife in Brazil.

== See also ==
- List of Streptomyces species
