= Streptomyces griseostramineus =

Scientific classification
- Domain: Bacteria
- Kingdom: Bacillati
- Phylum: Actinomycetota
- Class: Actinomycetes
- Order: Streptomycetales
- Family: Streptomycetaceae
- Genus: Streptomyces
- Species: S. griseostramineus

Binomial name
- Streptomyces griseostramineus (Preobrazhenskaya et al. 1957) Pridham et al. 1958 (Approved Lists 1980)

Type strain
- ATCC 19768, ATCC 23628, BCRC 12075, CBS 506.68, CCRC 12075, CECT 3273, CEST 3273, DSM 40161, DSMZ 40161, ETH 23436, ETH 28436, IFO 12781, INA 10381, ISP 5161, JCM 4385, KCC S-0385, KCCS-0385, KCTC 9878, NBRC 12781, NRRL B-5422, NRRL-ISP 5161, Preobrazhenskaya 10381, RIA 1048, UNIQEM 154, VKM Ac-968

Synonyms
- "Actinomyces griseostramineus" Preobrazhenskaya et al. 1957

Species of bacterium

Streptomyces griseostramineus is a bacterium species from the genus of Streptomyces which has been isolated from soil in Russia.

== See also ==
- List of Streptomyces species
