= Streptomyces lilacinus =

Scientific classification
- Domain: Bacteria
- Kingdom: Bacillati
- Phylum: Actinomycetota
- Class: Actinomycetes
- Order: Streptomycetales
- Family: Streptomycetaceae
- Genus: Streptomyces
- Species: S. lilacinus

Binomial name
- Streptomyces lilacinus (Nakazawa et al. 1956) Witt and Stackebrandt 1991

Type strain
- 1PV 2053, 2305, ATCC 23930, BCRC 12421, BCRC 15107, CBS 914.68, CCRC 12421, CCRC 15107, CECT 3264, CEST 3264, CIP 108148, DSM 40254, DSM 40354, DSMZ 40254, ETH 21214, ETH 24214, IFO 12884, IFO 3944, IPV 1999, IPV 2053, ISP 5254, JCM 4188, JCM 4648, KCC S-0188, KCCS-0188, KCTC 9875, LIA 759, LMG 20059, Nakazawa 2305, NBRC 12884, NBRC 3944, NIHJ 71, NRRL B-1968, NRRL-ISP 5254, RIA 1180, RIA 490, VKM Ac-962

Synonyms
- "Streptomyces kashmirensis" Gupta and Chopra 1963; Streptomyces kashimirensis (Gupta and Chopra 1963) Witt and Stackebrandt 1991; Streptomyces kashmirensis corrig. (Gupta and Chopra 1963) Witt and Stackebrandt 1991; "Streptomyces lilacinus" Nakazawa et al. 1956; Streptoverticillium lilacinum (Nakazawa et al. 1956) Locci et al. 1969 (Approved Lists 1980); Streptoverticillium kashmirense corrig. (Gupta and Chopra 1963) Locci et al. 1969 (Approved Lists 1980); Streptoverticillium kashmirensis (Gupta and Chopra 1963) Locci et al. 1969 (Approved Lists 1980); "Verticillomyces lilacinus" (Nakazawa et al. 1956) Shinobu 1965

Species of bacterium

Streptomyces lilacinus is a bacterium species from the genus of Streptomyces which has been from soil.

== See also ==
- List of Streptomyces species
