= Streptomyces cerasinus =

Scientific classification
- Domain: Bacteria
- Kingdom: Bacillati
- Phylum: Actinomycetota
- Class: Actinomycetia
- Order: Streptomycetales
- Family: Streptomycetaceae
- Genus: Streptomyces
- Species: S. cerasinus

Binomial name
- Streptomyces cerasinus Kanchanasin et al. 2017

Type strain
- KCTC 39910, TISTR 2494, SR3-134

Species of bacterium

Streptomyces cerasinus is a bacterium species from the genus of Streptomyces which has been isolated from soil from Thailand.

== See also ==
- List of Streptomyces species
