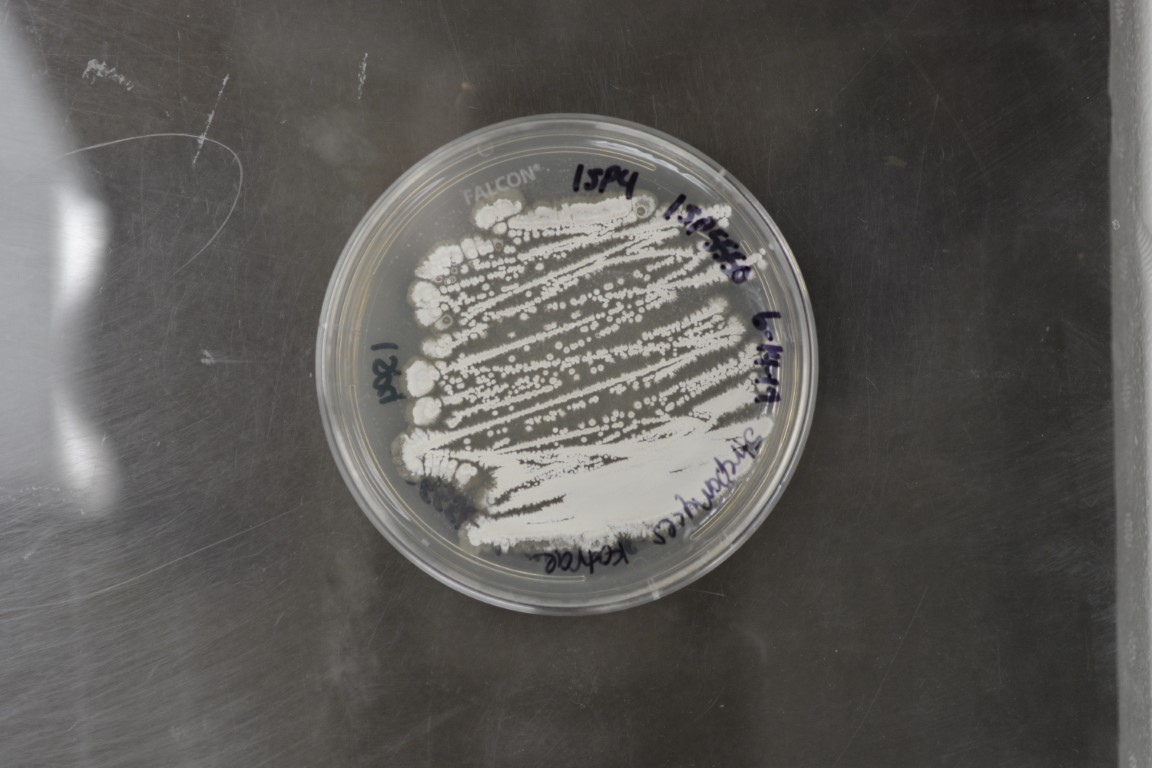

Scientific classification
- Domain: Bacteria
- Kingdom: Bacillati
- Phylum: Actinomycetota
- Class: Actinomycetes
- Order: Streptomycetales
- Family: Streptomycetaceae
- Genus: Streptomyces
- Species: S. katrae

Binomial name
- Streptomyces katrae Gupta and Chopra 1963

Type strain
- ATCC 27440, BCRC 15199, CBS 748.72, CCRC 15199, CGMCC 4.1914, DSM 40550, IFO 13447, IMET 43361, ISP 5550, JCM 4777, KCC S-0777, KCCS-0777, NBRC 13447, NCIMB 12981, NRRL B-3093, NRRL-ISP 5550, RIA 1408, RIA 794, RRL 5036, VKM Ac-1220

= Streptomyces katrae =

Species of bacterium

Streptomyces katrae is a bacterium species from the genus of Streptomyces which has been isolated from soil in India.

== See also ==
- List of Streptomyces species
