= Streptomyces griseoluteus =

Scientific classification
- Domain: Bacteria
- Kingdom: Bacillati
- Phylum: Actinomycetota
- Class: Actinomycetes
- Order: Streptomycetales
- Family: Streptomycetaceae
- Genus: Streptomyces
- Species: S. griseoluteus

Binomial name
- Streptomyces griseoluteus Umezawa et al. 1950

Type strain
- AS 4.1440, ATCC 12768, BCRC 16229, CBS 112.66, CBS 113.66, CBS 676.72, CCM 3242, CCRC 16229, CGMCC 4.1440, DSM 40392, DSM 41141, ETH 24459, ETH 28388, HUT-6058, IAM 60, IFM 1055, IFO 13375, IMRU 3674, IMRU 3729, ISP 5392, JCM 4041, JCM 4765, KCC S-0041, KCC S-0765, Lanoot R-8721, LMG 19356, NBRC 13375, NIHJ 22, NIHJ P-37, NRRL B-1315, NRRL B-315, NRRL-ISP 5392, PSA 207, R-8721, RIA 1336, Umezawa P-37, VKM Ac-976, Y. Okami P 37

Species of bacterium

Streptomyces griseoluteus is a bacterium species from the genus of Streptomyces which has been isolated from soil in Tokyo in Japan. Streptomyces griseoluteus produces griseoluteic acid, griseolutein A and griseolutein B.

== See also ==
- List of Streptomyces species
