= Streptomyces violarus =

Scientific classification
- Domain: Bacteria
- Kingdom: Bacillati
- Phylum: Actinomycetota
- Class: Actinomycetes
- Order: Streptomycetales
- Family: Streptomycetaceae
- Genus: Streptomyces
- Species: S. violarus

Binomial name
- Streptomyces violarus Pridham 1970

Type strain
- AS 4.1378, ATCC 15892, BCRC 12462, CBS 650.72, CCRC 12462, CCT 5009, CGMCC 4.1378, DSM 40209, IFO 13349, INMI 1205, ISP 5209, ISP 5209 +JCM 4237, JCM 4237, JCM 4851, KCC S-0237, KCC S-0851, Lanoot R-8770, LMG 19397, LMG 8592, NBRC 13349, NIHJ 495, NRRL B-2867, NRRL-ISP 5209, R-8770, RIA 1310, RIA 708, VKM Ac-532

Synonyms
- Streptomyces violatus, Actinomyces violarus

Species of bacterium

Streptomyces violarus is a bacterium species from the genus of Streptomyces which has been isolated from soil in Egypt. It is a mesophilic bacterium that produces antibiotic compounds.

== See also ==
- List of Streptomyces species
