= Streptomyces anthocyanicus =

Scientific classification
- Domain: Bacteria
- Kingdom: Bacillati
- Phylum: Actinomycetota
- Class: Actinomycetia
- Order: Streptomycetales
- Family: Streptomycetaceae
- Genus: Streptomyces
- Species: S. anthocyanicus

Binomial name
- Streptomyces anthocyanicus (Krassilnikov et al. 1965) Pridham 1970 (Approved Lists 1980)

Type strain
- AS 4.1683, ATCC 19821, CGMCC 4.1683, DSM 41422, IFO 14892, INMI 69, ISP 5411, JCM 5058, KCC S-1058, KCCM 40199, KCTC 9755, MS 1456, NBRC 14892, NRRL B-12341, NRRL B-24292

Synonyms
- Actinomyces anthocyanicus

Species of bacterium

Streptomyces anthocyanicus is a bacterium species from the genus of Streptomyces which was isolated from soil.

== See also ==
- List of Streptomyces species
