= Streptomyces aldersoniae =

Scientific classification
- Domain: Bacteria
- Kingdom: Bacillati
- Phylum: Actinomycetota
- Class: Actinomycetia
- Order: Streptomycetales
- Family: Streptomycetaceae
- Genus: Streptomyces
- Species: S. aldersoniae

Binomial name
- Streptomyces aldersoniae Kumar and Goodfellow 2010

Type strain
- DSM 41909, NRRL 18513

Synonyms
- Streptomyces hygroscopicus

Species of bacterium

Streptomyces aldersoniae is a bacterium species from the genus of Streptomyces.

== See also ==
- List of Streptomyces species
