= Streptomyces bacillaris =

Scientific classification
- Domain: Bacteria
- Kingdom: Bacillati
- Phylum: Actinomycetota
- Class: Actinomycetes
- Order: Streptomycetales
- Family: Streptomycetaceae
- Genus: Streptomyces
- Species: S. bacillaris

Binomial name
- Streptomyces bacillaris Pridham 1970

Type strain
- AS 4.1548, ATCC 15855, BCRC 15181, CBS 788.72, CCRC 15181, CGMCC 4.1548, CGMCC 4.1584, DSM 40598, IFO 13487, INMI 445, ISP 5598, JCM 4727, JCM 4917, KCC S-0727, KCTC 9018, LMG 8585, NBRC 13487, NRRL B-3038, NRRL-ISP 5598, RIA 1448, RIA 336, VKM Ac-58

Synonyms
- Actinomyces bacillaris; Streptomyces griseobrunneus

Species of bacterium

Streptomyces bacillaris is a bacterium species from the genus of Streptomyces which has been isolated from forest soil in Oregon in the United States.

== See also ==
- List of Streptomyces species
