= Streptomyces manipurensis =

Scientific classification
- Domain: Bacteria
- Kingdom: Bacillati
- Phylum: Actinomycetota
- Class: Actinomycetia
- Order: Streptomycetales
- Family: Streptomycetaceae
- Genus: Streptomyces
- Species: S. boncukensis

Binomial name
- Streptomyces boncukensis Nimaichand et al. 2021

Type strain
- MBRL 201

Species of bacterium

Streptomyces manipurensis is a bacterium species from the genus of Streptomyces which has been isolated from limestone from Hundung in India.

== See also ==
- List of Streptomyces species
