= Streptomyces caeni =

Scientific classification
- Domain: Bacteria
- Kingdom: Bacillati
- Phylum: Actinomycetota
- Class: Actinomycetia
- Order: Streptomycetales
- Family: Streptomycetaceae
- Genus: Streptomyces
- Species: S. caeni

Binomial name
- Streptomyces caeni Huang et al. 2018

Type strain
- HA15955

Species of bacterium

Streptomyces caeni is a bacterium species from the genus of Streptomyces which has been isolated from mangrove mud from Sanya in China.

== See also ==
- List of Streptomyces species
