= List of sponges of South Africa =

List of species that form a part of the poriferan fauna of South Africa

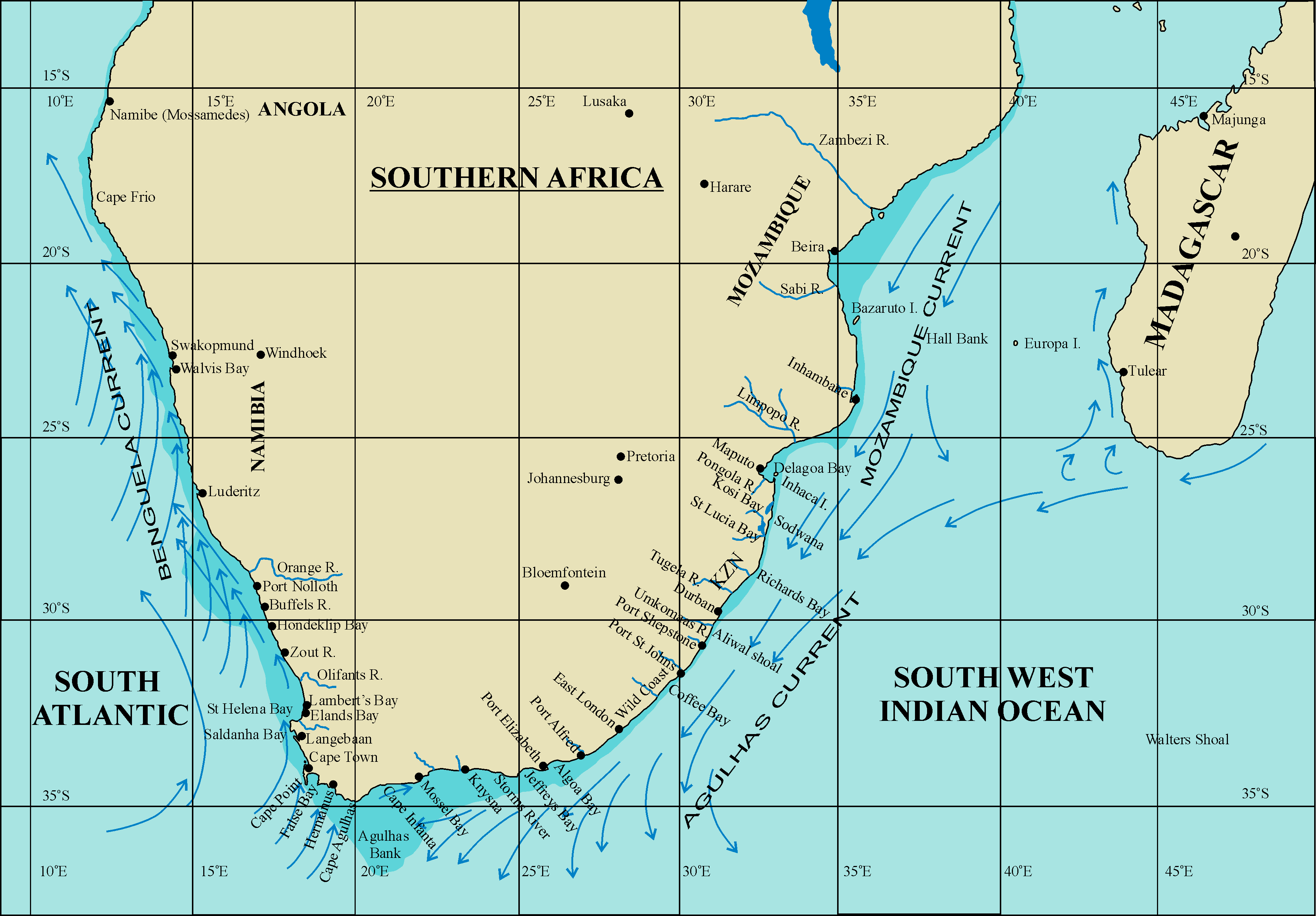
Map of the Southern African coastline showing some of the landmarks referred to in species range statements

The list of sponges of South Africa is a list of species that form a part of the poriferan (Phylum Porifera) fauna of South Africa. Taxonomy follows WoRMS. The list follows the SANBI listing on iNaturalist, and does not always agree with WoRMS for distribution.

Sponges or sea sponges are primarily marine invertebrates of the metazoan phylum Porifera (/pəˈrɪfərəˌ pɔː-/ pər-IF-ər-ə, por-; meaning 'pore bearer'), a basal animal clade and a sister taxon of the diploblasts. They are sessile filter feeders that are bound to the seabed, and are one of the most ancient members of macrobenthos, with many historical species being important reef-building organisms.

Sponges are multicellular organisms consisting of jelly-like mesohyl sandwiched between two thin layers of cells, and usually have tube-like bodies full of pores and channels that allow water to circulate through them. They have unspecialized cells that can transform into other types and that often migrate between the main cell layers and the mesohyl in the process. They do not have complex nervous, digestive or circulatory systems. Instead, most rely on maintaining a constant water flow through their bodies to obtain food and oxygen and to remove wastes, usually via flagella movements of the so-called "collar cells".

Sponges are believed to have been the first outgroup to branch off the evolutionary tree from the last common ancestor of all animals, with fossil evidence of primitive sponges such as Otavia from as early as the Tonian period (around 800 Mya). The branch of zoology that studies sponges is spongiology. (Full article...)

== Class Calcarea ==
=== Subclass Calcaronea ===
==== Order Leucosolenida ====
===== Family Grantiidae =====
- Amphiute lepadiformis Borojevic, 1967
- Aphroceras alcicornis Gray, 1858, syn. Leucandra alcicornis (Gray, 1858), Cyathiscus actinia Haeckel, 1869. (Note: Not listed for South Africa on WoRMS)
- Leucandra algoaensis (Bowerbank, 1864), syn, Leucogypsia algoaensis Bowerbank, 1864.
- Leucandra armata (Urban, 1908), syn. Leuconia armata Urban, 1908.
- Leucandra australiensis (Carter, 1886), syn. Leuconia australiensis Carter, 1886.
- Leucandra bleeki (Haeckel, 1872), syn. Leucaltis bleeki Haeckel, 1872.
- Leucandra hentschelii Brøndsted, 1931, syn.Leuconia hentschelii (Brøndsted, 1931),
- Leucandra spissa (Urban, 1909), syn. Leuconia spissa Urban, 1909.

===== Family Amphoriscidae =====
- Amphoriscus kryptoraphis Urban, 1908
- Leucilla capsula (Haeckel, 1870), syn. Lipostomella capsula Haeckel, 1870.

===== Family Heteropiidae =====
- Grantessa ramosa (Haeckel, 1872), syn. Grantia ramosa Smith in Haeckel, 1872, Leuckartea natalensis Miklucho-Maclay in Haeckel, 1872, Sycandra ramosa Haeckel, 1872, Sycandra ramosa Haeckel, 1872.
- Grantessa rarispinosa Borojevic, 1967
- Grantia socialis Borojevic, 1967
- Heteropia glomerosa (Bowerbank, 1873), syn. Sycettusa glomerosa (Bowerbank, 1873), Leuconia glomerosa Bowerbank, 1873, Heteropia simplex Row in Dendy & Row, 1913.
- Sycettusa hastifera (Row, 1909), syn. Grantilla hastifera Row, 1909.

===== Family Leucosoleniidae =====
- Leucosolenia botryoides (Ellis & Solander, 1786), syn. Spongia botryoides Ellis & Solander, 1786, orange pipe sponge.
- Leucosolenia eustephana Haeckel, 1872

===== Family Sycettidae =====
- Sycon defendens Borojevic, 1967
- Sycon dunstervillia (Haeckel, 1872), syn. Sycandra dunstervillia Haeckel, 1872.
- Sycon lunulatum (Haeckel, 1872), syn. Leucandra lunulata Haeckel, 1872, Leuconia lunulata (Haeckel, 1872).
- Sycon natalense Borojevic, 1967

=== Subclass Calcinea ===
==== Order Clathrinida ====
===== Family Clathrinidae =====
- Ascaltis gardineri (Dendy, 1913), syn. Clathrina gardineri (Dendy, 1913),Leucosolenia gardineri Dendy, 1913, Leucosolenia gardineri var. vergensis Kumar, 1924.
- Ernsta cordata (Haeckel, 1872), syn. Ascandra cordata Haeckel, 1872, Clathrina cordata (Haeckel, 1872), Leucosolenia cordata (Haeckel, 1872).

===== Family Leucettidae =====
- Leucetta trigona Haeckel, 1872

== Class Demospongiae ==
=== Subclass Heteroscleromorpha ===
==== Order Agelasida ====
===== Family Agelasidae =====
- Agelas mauritiana var. oxeata Lévi, 1961 Pocked cup sponge

==== Order Axinellida ====
===== Family Axinellidae =====
- Axinella natalensis (Kirkpatrick, 1903), syn. Tragosia infundibuliformis var. natalensis Kirkpatrick, 1903.
- Axinella weltnerii (Lendenfeld, 1897), syn. Phacellia weltnerii Lendenfeld, 1897. Crumpled sponge

===== Family Stelligeridae =====
- Higginsia bidentifera (Ridley & Dendy, 1886)
- Higginsia natalensis Carter, 1885, syn. Higginsia coralloides var. natalensis Carter, 1885,

===== Family Raspailiidae =====
Subfamily Raspailiinae

- Aulospongus involutus (Kirkpatrick, 1903), syn. Hemectyonilla involuta (Kirkpatrick, 1903), Stylostichon involutum Kirkpatrick, 1903.
- Endectyon gorgonioides (Kirkpatrick, 1903), syn. Syringella gorgonioides Kirkpatrick, 1903.
- Raspailia rigida Ridley & Dendy, 1886

Subfamily Cyamoninae

- Waltherarndtia caliculatum (Kirkpatrick, 1903), syn. Hymeniacidon caliculatum var. osculatum Kirkpatrick, 1903, Hymeniacidon caliculatum Kirkpatrick, 1903.

==== Order Biemnida ====
===== Family Biemnidae =====
- Biemna anisotoxa Lévi, 1963 yellow encrusting sponge.
- Biemna megalosigma var. sigmodragma Lévi, 1963
- Biemna pedonculata Lévi, 1963
- Biemna polyphylla Lévi, 1963
- Biemna rhabdostyla Uriz, 1988
- Sigmaxinella arborea Kirkpatrick, 1903
- Sigmaxinella incrustans Kirkpatrick, 1903

==== Order Bubarida ====
===== Family Desmanthidae =====
- Petromica (Petromica) digitata (Burton, 1929), syn. Petromica digitata (Burton, 1929), Monanthus plumosus var. digitatus Burton, 1929, Monanthus digitatus Burton, 1929.
- Petromica (Petromica) plumosa Kirkpatrick, 1903, syn. Petromica plumosa Kirkpatrick, 1903, Monanthus plumosus Kirkpatrick, 1903.
- Petromica (Petromica) tubulata (Kirkpatrick, 1903), syn.Petromica tubulata (Kirkpatrick, 1903),Monanthus plumosus var. tubulatus Kirkpatrick, 1903.

==== Order Clionaida ====
===== Family Clionaidae =====
- Cliona celata Grant, 1826, syn. complicated, see citation. boring sponge.
- Spheciospongia capensis (Carter, 1882), syn. Suberites capensis Carter, 1882.
- Spheciospongia vagabunda (Ridley, 1884), syn. Anthosigmella vagabunda Ridley, 1884, Spirastrella cylindrica Kieschnick, 1896, Spirastrella vagabunda Ridley, 1884, Spirastrella vagabunda Ridley, 1884. vagabond sponge.

===== Family Placospongiidae =====
- Placospongia carinata (Bowerbank, 1858), syn. Geodia carinata Bowerbank, 1858.
- Placospongia melobesioides Gray, 1867

==== Order Haplosclerida ====
===== Family Callyspongiidae =====
- Callyspongia confoederata (sensu Ridley, 1884), syn.Spinosella confoederata (Ridley, 1884), Tuba confoederata sensu Ridley, 1884. Spiky tube sponge
- Callyspongia hospitalis (Stephens, 1915), syn. Pachychalina hospitalis Stephens, 1915.
- Callyspongia (Callyspongia) tubulosa (Esper, 1797), syn. Spongia tubulosa sensu Esper, 1797, Siphonochalina tubulosa (Esper, 1797), Phylosiphonia (Anatoxius) tenuispina Lendenfeld, 1887, Phylosiphonia (Anatoxius) pumila Lendenfeld, 1887, Callyspongia tubulosa sensu (Esper, 1797).

===== Family Chalinidae =====
- Haliclona (Haliclona) anonyma (Stephens, 1915), syn. Haliclona anonyma (Stephens, 1915), Siphonochalina anonyma Stephens, 1915. Tubular fan sponge
- Haliclona bawiana (Lendenfeld, 1897)
- Haliclona (Reniera) ciocalyptoides Burton, 1933, syn. Haliclona ciocalyptoides Burton, 1933.
- Haliclona (Gellius) flagellifera (Ridley & Dendy, 1886), syn. Haliclona flagellifera (Ridley & Dendy, 1886), Gellius flagellifer Ridley & Dendy, 1886, Adocia flagellifera (Ridley & Dendy, 1887), Hemigellius flagellifer (Ridley & Dendy, 1886), Sigmadocia flagellifera (Ridley & Dendy, 1886).
- Haliclona (Soestella) implexa (Schmidt, 1868), syn. Haliclona implexa (Schmidt, 1868), Reniera implexa Schmidt, 1868.
- Haliclona saldanhae (Stephens, 1915), syn. Reniera saldanhae Stephens, 1915.
- Haliclona simplicissima (Burton, 1933), syn. Adocia simplicissima Burton, 1933,
- Haliclona (Haliclona) stilensis Burton, 1933, syn. Haliclona stilensis Burton, 1933.
- Haliclona submonilifera Uriz, 1988 Bubble bead sponge
- Haliclona tulearensis Vacelet, Vasseur & Lévi, 1976

===== Family Petrosiidae =====
- Petrosia (Strongylophora) vulcaniensis Samaai & Gibbons, 2005, syn. Petrosia vulcaniensis Samaai & Gibbons, 2005.

===== Family Phloeodictyidae =====
- Oceanapia eumitum (Kirkpatrick, 1903), syn. Phloeodictyon eumitum Kirkpatrick, 1903.
- Oceanapia seychellensis (Dendy, 1922), syn. Phloeodictyon seychellense Dendy, 1922. Chimneyed football sponge (Note: Not found in South Africa according to WoRMS distribution records)

==== Order Merliida ====
===== Family Hamacanthidae =====
- Hamacantha (Vomerula) esperioides Ridley & Dendy, 1886 Fibrous sponge
- Hamacantha (Vomerula) papillata Vosmaer, 1885, syn. Hamacantha papillata Vosmaer, 1885.

==== Order Poecilosclerida ====
===== Family Acarnidae =====
- Acarnus claudei van Soest, Hooper & Hiemstra, 1991
- Iophon cheliferum Ridley & Dendy, 1886, syn. Iophon chelifer Ridley & Dendy, 1886.
- Paracornulum coherens Lévi, 1963

===== Family Chondropsidae =====
- Psammoclema inordinatum (Kirkpatrick, 1903), syn. Psammopemma inordinatum Kirkpatrick, 1903.

===== Family Cladorhizidae =====
- Cladorhiza ephyrula Lévi, 1964

===== Family Coelosphaeridae =====
- Coelosphaera (Coelosphaera) navicelligera (Ridley, 1885), syn. Siderodermella navicelligera (Ridley, 1885), Coelosphaera navicelligera (Ridley, 1884), Crella navicelligera Ridley, 1885.
- Forcepia (Forcepia) agglutinans Burton, 1933, syn. Forcepia agglutinans Burton, 1933.
- Forcepia (Leptolabis) australis (Lévi, 1963), syn. Trachyforcepia australis Lévi, 1963.
- Histodermella natalensis (Kirkpatrick, 1903), syn. Coelosphaera (Coelosphaera) natalensis (Kirkpatrick, 1903), Histoderma natalensis Kirkpatrick, 1903.
- Inflatella belli (Kirkpatrick, 1907) Gooseberry sponge
- Lissodendoryx (Anomodoryx) coralgardeniensis Samaai & Gibbons, 2005, syn. Lissodendoryx coralgardeniensis Samaai & Gibbons, 2005.
- Lissodendoryx (Ectyodoryx) arenaria Burton, 1936, syn. Lissodendoryx arenaria Burton, 1936.
- Lissodendoryx (Lissodendoryx) areolata Lévi, 1963, syn. Lissodendoryx (Lissodendoryx) areolata Lévi, 1963 Lissodendoryx (Lissodendoryx) areolata Lévi, 1963.
- Lissodendoryx (Lissodendoryx) digitata (Ridley & Dendy, 1886), syn. Myxilla digitata Ridley & Dendy, 1886, Lissodendoryx digitata (Ridley & Dendy, 1886).
- Lissodendoryx (Lissodendoryx) isodictyalis (Carter, 1882), syn. Halichondria isodictyalis Carter, 1882.
- Lissodendoryx (Lissodendoryx) simplex (Baer, 1906), syn. Dendoryx simplex Baer, 1906, Myxilla (Myxilla) simplex (Baer, 1906), Myxilla simplex (Baer, 1906).
- Lissodendoryx (Lissodendoryx) stephensoni Burton, 1936, syn. Lissodendoryx stephensoni Burton, 1936.
- Lissodendoryx (Lissodendoryx) ternatensis (Thiele, 1903), syn. Hamigera ternatensis Thiele, 1903, Lissodendoryx sinensis Brøndsted, 1929, Lissodendoryx ternatensis (Thiele, 1903).

===== Family Crambeidae =====
- Crambe acuata (Lévi, 1958), syn. Crambe chelastra Lévi, 1960, Folitispa acuata Lévi, 1958. Stellar sponge
- Lithochela conica Burton, 1929

===== Family Crellidae =====
- Crella caespes (Ehlers, 1870), syn.Clathria (Clathria) caespes (Ehlers, 1870), Scopalina caespes Ehlers, 1870.
- Crella (Grayella) erecta Lévi, 1963, syn. Crella erecta Lévi, 1963.

===== Family Dendoricellidae =====
- Fibulia ramosa (Ridley & Dendy, 1886), syn. Desmacidon ramosa Ridley & Dendy, 1886, Isodictya ramosa (Ridley & Dendy, 1886), Plumocolumella ramosa (Ridley & Dendy, 1886). columnar sponge

===== Family Esperiopsidae =====
- Amphilectus informis (Stephens, 1915), syn. Esperiopsis informis Stephens, 1915.
- Esperiopsis papillata (Vosmaer, 1880), syn. Amphilectus papillatus Vosmaer, 1880.

===== Family Guitarridae =====
- Tetrapocillon novaezealandiae Brøndsted, 1924

===== Family Hymedesmiidae =====
- Hymedesmia (Hymedesmia) aurantiaca Lévi, 1963, syn. Hymedesmia aurantiaca Lévi, 1963,
- Hymedesmia (Hymedesmia) parva Stephens, 1915, syn, Hymedesmia parva Stephens, 1915,
- Phorbas clathratus (Lévi, 1963), syn, Pronax clathrata Lévi, 1963,
- Phorbas dayi (Lévi, 1963), syn. Anchinoe dayi Lévi, 1963,
- Phorbas fibrosus (Lévi, 1963), syn. Pronax fibrosa Lévi, 1963,
- Phorbas lamellatus (Lévi, 1963), syn. Pronax lamellata Lévi, 1963,
- Phorbas mollis (Kirkpatrick, 1903), syn. Clathria mollis Kirkpatrick, 1903,
- Phorbas pustulosus (Carter, 1882), syn. Pronax pustulosa (Carter, 1882), Halichondria pustulosa Carter, 1882, Clathria (Microciona) pustulosa (Carter, 1882), Anaata pustulosa (Carter, 1882), Baseball glove sponge
- Plocamionida ambigua (Bowerbank, 1866), syn. Microciona ambigua Bowerbank, 1866, Plocamia lundbecki (Breitfuss, 1912), Plocamia ambigua (Bowerbank, 1866), Myxilla lundbecki Breitfuss, 1912, Hymedesmia indistincta Bowerbank, 1874, Hastatus ambiguus (Bowerbank, 1866), Antho lundbecki (Breitfuss, 1912)

===== Family Iotrochotidae =====
- Iotrochota purpurea (Bowerbank, 1875), syn, Spongia foveolaria Lamarck, 1814, Halichondria purpurea Bowerbank, 1875, Chondrocladia sessilis Kieschnick, 1900, Chondrocladia ramosa Kieschnick, 1900, Chondrocladia dura Kieschnick, 1900.

===== Family Isodictyidae =====
- Isodictya alata (Stephens, 1915), syn. Homoeodictya alata Stephens, 1915.
- Isodictya compressa (Esper, 1794), syn. Spongia pannea Lamarck, 1814, Spongia compressa Esper, 1794, Homoeodictya compressa (Esper, 1794).
- Isodictya conulosa (Ridley & Dendy, 1886), syn. Homoeodictya conulosa (Ridley & Dendy, 1886), Desmacidon conulosum Ridley & Dendy, 1886.
- Isodictya ectofibrosa (Lévi, 1963), syn. Desmacidon ectofibrosa Lévi, 1963, Fibulia ectyofibrosa (Lévi, 1963).
- Isodictya elastica (Vosmaer, 1880), syn. Homoeodictya elastica (Vosmaer, 1880), Desmacidon elastica Vosmaer, 1880.
- Isodictya foliata (Carter, 1885), syn. Textiliforma foliata Carter, 1885.
- Isodictya frondosa (Lévi, 1963), syn. Homoeodictya frondosa Lévi, 1963. Fanned kelp sponge
- Isodictya grandis (Ridley & Dendy, 1886), syn. Homoeodictya grandis Ridley & Dendy, 1886, Desmacidon (Homoeodictya) grandis (Ridley & Dendy, 1886).
- Isodictya multiformis (Stephens, 1915), syn. Homoeodictya multiformis Stephens, 1915.

===== Family Latrunculiidae =====
- Cyclacanthia bellae (Samaai, Gibbons, Kelly & Davies-Coleman, 2003), syn. Latrunculia bellae Samaai, Gibbons, Kelly & Davies-Coleman, 2003.
- Cyclacanthia cloverlyae Samaai, Govender & Kelly, 2004
- Cyclacanthia mzimayiensis Samaai, Govender & Kelly, 2004
- Latrunculia (Latrunculia) biformis Kirkpatrick, 1907, syn. Latrunculia biformis Kirkpatrick, 1907, Latrunculia apicalis var. biformis Kirkpatrick, 1907. Mud-clump sponge
- Latrunculia (Biannulata) lunaviridis Samaai, Gibbons, Kelly & Davies-Coleman, 2003, syn.Latrunculia lunaviridis Samaai, Gibbons, Kelly & Davies-Coleman, 2003. Green moon sponge
- Latrunculia (Biannulata) microacanthoxea Samaai, Gibbons, Kelly & Davies-Coleman, 2003, syn, Latrunculia microacanthoxea Samaai, Gibbons, Kelly & Davies-Coleman, 2003.
- Latrunculia (Biannulata) spinispiraefera Brøndsted, 1924, syn. Spirastrella spinispiraefera (Brøndsted, 1924), Latrunculia spinispiraefera Brøndsted, 1924. Vented sponge
- Strongylodesma algoaensis Samaai, Gibbons, Kelly & Davies-Coleman, 2003
- Strongylodesma aliwaliensis Samaai, Keyzers & Davies-Coleman, 2004
- Strongylodesma tsitsikammaensis Samaai, Gibbons, Kelly & Davies-Coleman, 2003
- Tsitsikamma favus Samaai & Kelly, 2002
- Tsitsikamma pedunculata Samaai, Gibbons, Kelly & Davies-Coleman, 2003
- Tsitsikamma scurra Samaai, Gibbons, Kelly & Davies-Coleman, 2003

===== Family Microcionidae =====
Subfamily Microcioninae

- Clathria (Clathria) axociona Lévi, 1963, syn. Clathria axociona Lévi, 1963.
- Clathria (Axosuberites) benguelaensis Samaai & Gibbons, 2005, syn. Clathria benguelaensis Samaai & Gibbons, 2005.
- Clathria (Thalysias) cactiformis (Lamarck, 1814), syn. Spongia cactiformis Lamarck, 1814 and many others.
- Clathria (Clathria) conica Lévi, 1963, syn. Clathria conica Lévi, 1963.
- Clathria (Thalysias) cullingworthi Burton, 1931, syn. Clathria cullingworthi Burton, 1931.
- Clathria (Clathria) dayi Lévi, 1963, syn. Clathria dayi Lévi, 1963.
- Clathria (Thalysias) delaubenfelsi (Lévi, 1963), syn. Clathria delaubenfelsi (Lévi, 1963), Rhaphidophlus delaubenfelsi Lévi, 1963.
- Clathria (Clathria) elastica Lévi, 1963, syn. Clathria (Clathria) elastica Lévi, 1963.
- Clathria (Thalysias) flabellata (Burton, 1936), syn. Clathria (Clathria) flabellata (Burton, 1936), Clathria flabellata (Burton, 1936), Rhaphidophlus flabellata Burton 1936.
- Clathria (Clathria) hexagonopora Lévi, 1963, syn. Clathria hexagonopora Lévi, 1963.
- Clathria (Thalysias) hooperi Samaai & Gibbons, 2005, syn.Clathria hooperi Samaai & Gibbons, 2005. Nodular sponge
- Clathria (Thalysias) lissoclada (Burton, 1934), syn. Rhaphidophlus lissocladus Burton, 1934, Clathria lissoclada (Burton, 1934). Triangular blade sponge
- Clathria (Clathria) lobata Vosmaer, 1880, syn. Clathria lobata Vosmaer, 1880 and others.
- Clathria (Thalysias) nervosa (Lévi, 1963), syn. Clathria nervosa (Lévi, 1963), Axociella nervosa Lévi, 1963.
- Clathria (Clathria) omegiensis Samaai & Gibbons, 2005, syn. Clathria omegiensis Samaai & Gibbons, 2005.
- Clathria (Isociella) oudekraalensis Samaai & Gibbons, 2005, syn. Clathria oudekraalensis Samaai & Gibbons, 2005.
- Clathria (Thalysias) oxitoxa Lévi, 1963, syn. Clathria oxitoxa Lévi, 1963.
- Clathria (Clathria) pachystyla Lévi, 1963, syn. Clathria pachystyla Lévi, 1963. Orange finger sponge
- Clathria (Clathria) parva Lévi, 1963, syn. Clathria (Axosuberites) parva Lévi, 1963, 'Clathria parva Lévi, 1963.
- Clathria (Clathria) rhaphidotoxa Stephens, 1915, syn. Clathria rhaphidotoxa Stephens, 1915.
- Clathria (Microciona) similis (Thiele, 1903), syn. Clathria similis (Thiele, 1903), Hymeraphia similis Thiele, 1903, Microciona similis (Thiele, 1903).
- Clathria (Microciona) stephensae Hooper, 1996, syn.Axocielita similis (Stephens, 1915), Clathria stephensae Hooper, 1996, Microciona similis Stephens, 1915.
- Clathria (Clathria) zoanthifera Lévi, 1963

Subfamily Ophlitaspongiinae

- Antho (Antho) dichotoma (Linnaeus, 1767), syn. various.
- Antho (Antho) involvens (Schmidt, 1864), syn. various.
- Antho (Acarnia) kellyae Samaai & Gibbons, 2005, syn. Antho kellyae Samaai & Gibbons, 2005.
- Antho (Acarnia) prima (Brøndsted, 1924) Orange fan sponge

Subfamily Ophlitaspongiinae

- Artemisina vulcani Lévi, 1963
- Echinoclathria dichotoma (Lévi, 1963), syn. Ophlitaspongia dichotoma Lévi, 1963. Tree sponge, Orange tree sponge

===== Family Mycalidae =====
- Mycale (Aegogropila) meridionalis Lévi, 1963, syn. Mycale meridionalis Lévi, 1963.
- Mycale (Aegogropila) simonis (Ridley & Dendy, 1886), syn. Mycale simonis (Ridley & Dendy, 1886), Esperella simonis Ridley & Dendy, 1886.
- Mycale (Aegogropila) tapetum Samaai & Gibbons, 2005, syn. Mycale tapetum Samaai & Gibbons, 2005.
- Mycale (Carmia) macilenta (Bowerbank, 1866), syn. Hymeniacidon macilenta Bowerbank, 1866.
- Mycale (Carmia) phyllophila Hentschel, 1911, syn. Mycale phyllophila Hentschel, 1911.
- Mycale (Carmia) pulvinus Samaai & Gibbons, 2005, syn. Mycale pulvinus Samaai & Gibbons, 2005.
- Mycale (Mycale) anisochela Lévi, 1963, syn, Mycale anisochela Lévi, 1963. Brain sponge
- Mycale (Mycale) sulcata Hentschel, 1911, syn. Mycale sulcata Hentschel, 1911, Mycale sulcata var. minor Hentschel, 1911.
- Mycale (Mycale) trichela Lévi, 1963, syn. Mycale trichela Lévi, 1963.
- Mycale (Oxymycale) stephensae Samaai & Gibbons, 2005, syn. Mycale stephensae Samaai & Gibbons, 2005.
- Mycale (Paresperella) atlantica (Stephens, 1917), syn. Paresperella atlantica Stephens, 1917, Mycale atlantica (Stephens, 1917).
- Mycale (Paresperella) levii (Uriz, 1987), syn. Mycale levii (Uriz, 1987), Paresperella atlantica sensu Lévi, 1963.
- Mycale (Paresperella) toxifera (Lévi, 1963), syn. Mycale toxifera (Lévi, 1963).
- Mycale (Zygomycale) parishii (Bowerbank, 1875), syn. Raphiodesma parishii Bowerbank, 1875, Zygomycale parishii (Bowerbank, 1875).

===== Family Myxillidae =====
- Ectyonopsis flabellata (Lévi, 1963), syn. Ectyonancora flabellata Lévi, 1963.
- Ectyonopsis pluridentata (Lévi, 1963), syn. Ectyonancora pluridentata Lévi, 1963. Fused branch sponge
- Hymenancora tenuissima (Thiele, 1905), syn. Ectyomyxilla tenuissima (Thiele, 1905), Hymedesmia tenuissima Thiele, 1905, Jelissima tenuissima (Thiele, 1905).
- Myxilla (Myxilla) fimbriata (Bowerbank, 1866), syn. Isodictya fimbriata Bowerbank, 1866, Myxilla fimbriata (Bowerbank, 1866).
- Myxilla (Myxilla) incrustans (Johnston, 1842)
- Myxilla (Ectyomyxilla) kerguelensis (Hentschel, 1914), syn. Myxilla kerguelensis (Hentschel, 1914) , Ectyomyxilla kerguelensis Hentschel, 1914.
- Myxilla (Burtonanchora) sigmatifera (Lévi, 1963), syn, Myxilla sigmatifera (Lévi, 1963), Burtonanchora sigmatifera Lévi, 1963.

===== Family Podospongiidae =====
- Podospongia natalensis (Kirkpatrick, 1903), syn. Latrunculia natalensis Kirkpatrick, 1903.

===== Family Tedaniidae =====
- Tedania (Tedania) anhelans (Vio in Olivi, 1792) Chilli pepper sponge
- Tedania (Tedania) brondstedi Burton, 1936, syn. Tedania brondstedi Burton, 1936.
- Tedania (Tedania) scotiae Stephens, 1915, syn. Tedania scotiae Stephens, 1915.
- Tedania (Tedania) stylonychaeta Lévi, 1963, syn. Tedania stylonychaeta Lévi, 1963.
- Tedania (Tedania) tubulifera Lévi, 1963, syn. Tedania tubulifera Lévi, 1963.

==== Order Polymastiida ====
===== Family Polymastiidae =====
- Polymastia atlantica Samaai & Gibbons, 2005 Atlantic teat sponge
- Polymastia bouryesnaultae Samaai & Gibbons, 2005 Knobbly sponge
- Polymastia disclera Lévi, 1964
- Polymastia littoralis Stephens, 1915
- Polymastia mamillaris (Müller, 1806), syn, Spongia mamillaris Müller, 1806.
- Proteleia sollasi Dendy & Ridley, 1886

==== Order Spongillida ====
===== Family Spongillidae =====
- Corvospongilla zambesiana (Kirkpatrick, 1906) syn. Spongilla zambesiana Kirkpatrick, 1906 Freshwater
- Ephydatia fluviatilis capensis Kirkpatrick, 1907
- Eunapius fragilis (Leidy, 1851) syn. Spongilla fragilis Leidy, 1851 and various others Freshwater
- Eunapius michaelseni (Annandale, 1914) syn. Spongilla michaelseni Annandale, 1914 Freshwater
- Eunapius nitens (Carter, 1881) syn. Spongilla nitens Carter, 1881 Freshwater,
- Radiospongilla cerebellata (Bowerbank, 1863)
- Stratospongilla bombayensis (Carter, 1882), syn. Spongilla bombayensis Carter, 1882.

==== Order Suberitida ====
===== Family Halichondriidae =====
- Amorphinopsis fenestrata (Ridley, 1884), syn. Suberites oculatus Kieschnick, 1896, Prostylissa oculata (Kieschnick, 1896), Leucophloeus fenestratus Ridley, 1884, Ciocalypta oscitans Hooper, Cook, Hobbs & Kennedy, 1997, Ciocalypta oculata var. maxima Hentschel, 1912, Ciocalypta oculata (Kieschnick, 1896), Ciocalypta fenestrata (Ridley, 1884), Ciocalypta confossa Hooper, Cook, Hobbs & Kennedy, 1997, Amorphinopsis oculata var. maxima (Hentschel, 1912), Amorphinopsis oculata (Kieschnick, 1896).
- Axinyssa tethyoides Kirkpatrick, 1903, syn. Pseudaxinyssa tethyoides (Kirkpatrick, 1903).
- Ciocalypta alleni de Laubenfels, 1936
- Halichondria (Halichondria) capensis Samaai & Gibbons, 2005, syn. Halichondria capensis Samaai & Gibbons, 2005.
- Halichondria (Halichondria) gilvus Samaai & Gibbons, 2005, syn. Halichondria gilvus Samaai & Gibbons, 2005.
- Halichondria (Halichondria) panicea (Pallas, 1766), syn. Spongia panicea Pallas, 1766, plus very large number of others.
- Hymeniacidon kerguelensis var. capensis Hentschel, 1914
- Hymeniacidon stylifera (Stephens, 1915)
- Hymeniacidon sublittoralis Samaai & Gibbons, 2005
- Topsentia pachastrelloides (Topsent, 1892), syn. Spongosorites pachastrelloides (Topsent, 1892), Halichondria pachastrelloides Topsent, 1892.

===== Family Suberitidae =====
- Aaptos alphiensis Samaai & Gibbons, 2005
- Aaptos nuda (Kirkpatrick, 1903), syn. Trachya nuda Kirkpatrick, 1903.
- Homaxinella flagelliformis (Ridley & Dendy, 1886), syn. Raspailia flagelliformis Ridley & Dendy, 1886.
- Protosuberites aquaedulcioris (Annandale, 1915), syn. Laxosuberites aquaedulcioris (Annandale, 1915), Suberites aquaedulcioris Annandale, 1914.
- Protosuberites hendricksi Samaai & Gibbons, 2005
- Protosuberites reptans (Kirkpatrick, 1903), syn. Amorphinopsis reptans (Kirkpatrick, 1903), Bubaris reptans Kirkpatrick, 1903, Gilchristia reptans (Kirkpatrick, 1903).
- Suberites dandelenae Samaai & Maduray, 2017 Amorphous solid sponge
- Suberites globosus Carter, 1886 Walled suberite sponge
- Suberites kelleri Burton, 1930, syn. Suberites incrustans Keller, 1891. Crustose suberite sponge
- Suberites stilensis Burton, 1933
- Suberites sp. Nardo, 1833 Hermit encrusting sponge

==== Order Tethyida ====
===== Hemiasterellidae =====
- Hemiasterella vasiformis var. minor (Kirkpatrick, 1903), syn. Kalastrella vasiformis var. minor Kirkpatrick, 1903.
- Hemiasterella vasiformis (Kirkpatrick, 1903), syn. Kalastrella vasiformis Kirkpatrick, 1903.

===== Tethyidae =====
- Halicometes pediculata (Lévi, 1964), syn. Tethycordyla pediculata Lévi, 1964.
- Tethya aurantium (Pallas, 1766), syn. Alcyonium aurantium Pallas, 1766, Tethya lyncurium (Linnaeus, 1767), and others probably not relevant.
- Tethya magna Kirkpatrick, 1903
- Tethya rubra Samaai & Gibbons, 2005 (Note: This is a junior homonym of T. rubra Ribeiro & Muricy, 2004. The present species needs to be renamed.)
- Tethya sp. 1, hedgehog sponge
- Tethya sp. 2, Prickly pear sponge

==== Order Tetractinellida ====
Suborder Astrophorina

===== Family Ancorinidae =====
- Ancorina corticata Lévi, 1964
- Ancorina nanosclera Lévi, 1967, syn. Ancorina radix var. nanosclera Lévi, 1967.
- Chelotropella sphaerica Lendenfeld, 1907
- Dercitus natalensis (Burton, 1926) (Note: taxon inquirendum)
- Ecionemia baculifera (Kirkpatrick, 1903), syn. Coppatias baculifer Kirkpatrick, 1903.
- Ecionemia nigra Sollas, 1888
- Jaspis digonoxea (de Laubenfels, 1950), syn. Zaplethea digonoxea de Laubenfels, 1950. Candyfloss sponge
- Rhabdastrella actinosa (Lévi, 1964), syn. Aurora actinosa Lévi, 1964.
- Rhabdastrella primitiva (Burton, 1926), syn. Aurora primitiva Burton, 1926.
- Rhabdastrella spinosa (Lévi, 1967), syn. Aurora spinosa Lévi, 1967.
- Stelletta agulhana Lendenfeld, 1907 globular sponge, grey wall sponge
- Stelletta agulhana var. paucistella Burton, 1926
- Stelletta capensis Lévi, 1967
- Stelletta cyathioides Burton, 1926
- Stelletta farcimen Lendenfeld, 1907
- Stelletta grubii Schmidt, 1862, syn. Stelletta anceps Schmidt, 1868, Collingsia sarniensis Gray, 1867, Ecionemia coactura Bowerbank, 1874, Stelletta collingsi (Bowerbank, 1866), Tethea collingsii Bowerbank, 1866, Tethea schmidtii Bowerbank, 1866.
- Stelletta grubioides Burton, 1926
- Stelletta herdmani Dendy, 1905
- Stelletta horrens Kirkpatrick, 1902
- Stelletta horrens var. subcylindrica Burton, 1926
- Stelletta purpurea Ridley, 1884, syn. Stelletta purpurea var. parvistella Ridley, 1884.
- Stelletta retroclada (Lévi, 1967), syn. Myriastra retroclada Lévi, 1967.
- Stelletta rugosa Burton, 1926
- Stelletta sphaerica Burton, 1926
- Stelletta trisclera Lévi, 1967
- Stryphnus ponderosus (Bowerbank, 1866), syn. Ecionemia ponderosa Bowerbank, 1866.
- Stryphnus progressus (Lendenfeld, 1907), syn. Ancorina progressa Lendenfeld, 1907.
- Stryphnus unguiculus Sollas, 1886

===== Family Geodiidae =====
- Erylus amorphus Burton, 1926
- Erylus gilchristi Burton, 1926
- Erylus polyaster Lendenfeld, 1907
- Pachymatisma areolata Bowerbank, 1872
- Pachymatisma monaena Lendenfeld, 1907

Subfamily Erylinae

- Penares alata (Lendenfeld, 1907), syn. Pachamphilla alata Lendenfeld, 1907.
- Penares obtusus Lendenfeld, 1907
- Penares sphaera (Lendenfeld, 1907), syn. Papyrula sphaera Lendenfeld, 1907. Crater sponge

Subfamily Geodiinae

- Geodia basilea Lévi, 1964
- Geodia dendyi Burton, 1926, syn.Geodia (Isops) dendyi Burton, 1926.
- Geodia gallica (Lendenfeld, 1907), syn. Isops gallica Lendenfeld, 1907.
- Geodia globosa (Baer, 1906), syn. Sidonops globosa Baer, 1906.
- Geodia labyrinthica (Kirkpatrick, 1903), syn. Placospongia labyrinthica Kirkpatrick, 1903.
- Geodia libera Stephens, 1915
- Geodia littoralis Stephens, 1915
- Geodia megaster Burton, 1926
- Geodia ovifractus var.cyathioides Burton, 1926, syn. Geodia (Isops) ovifractus var. cyathioides Burton, 1926.
- Geodia ovifractus Burton, 1926
- Geodia perarmata Bowerbank, 1873
- Geodia robusta Lendenfeld, 1907
- Geodia stellata Lendenfeld, 1907

===== Family Macandrewiidae =====
- Macandrewia auris Lendenfeld, 1907

===== Family Pachastrellidae =====
- Pachastrella caliculata Kirkpatrick, 1902
- Pachastrella monilifera Schmidt, 1868
- Triptolemma incertum (Kirkpatrick, 1903)

===== Family Vulcanellidae =====
- Poecillastra compressa (Bowerbank, 1866), syn. Ecionemia compressa Bowerbank, 1866, Hymeniacidon placentula Bowerbank, 1874, Normania crassa Bowerbank, 1874, Pachastrella compressa (Bowerbank, 1866), Pachastrella stylifera Lendenfeld, 1897, Pachastrella tenuipilosa Lendenfeld, 1907, Poecillastra scabra (Schmidt, 1868), Stelletta scabra Schmidt, 1868.
- Poecillastra tenuirhabda (Lendenfeld, 1907), syn.Chelotropaena tenuirhabda Lendenfeld, 1907.
- Poecillastra tuberosa (Lévi, 1964), syn. Characella tuberosa Lévi, 1964.

Suborder Spirophorina

===== Family Scleritodermidae =====
- Microscleroderma hirsutum Kirkpatrick, 1903, syn. Amphibleptula hirsuta (Kirkpatrick, 1903).

===== Family Siphonidiidae =====
- Gastrophanella mammilliformis Burton, 1929
- Lithobactrum forte Kirkpatrick, 1903

===== Family Tetillidae =====
- Cinachyrella hamata (Lendenfeld, 1907), syn. Cinachyra hamata Lendenfeld, 1907.
- Craniella cranium f. microspira Lévi, 1967
- Craniella metaclada (Lendenfeld, 1907), syn. Tetilla metaclada (Lendfeld, 1907), Tethyopsilla metaclada Lendenfeld, 1907.
- Craniella zetlandica (Carter, 1872), syn. Tetilla zetlandica (Carter, 1872), Tethyopsilla zetlandica (Carter, 1872), Tethya zetlandica Carter, 1872, Craniellopsis zetlandica (Carter, 1872).
- Tetilla bonaventuraKirkpatrick, 1902
- Tetilla capillosa Lévi, 1967 Furry sponge
- Tetilla casula (Carter, 1871), syn. Tethya casula Carter, 1871, Casula casula (Carter, 1871). Volcano sponge
- Tetilla pedonculata Lévi, 1967

===== Family Theonellidae =====
- Discodermia natalensis Kirkpatrick, 1903
- Theonella conica (Kieschnick, 1896), syn. Discodermia conica Kieschnick, 1896. Conical sponge

===== Family Thoosidae =====
- Alectona wallichii (Carter, 1874), syn. Gummina wallichii Carter, 1874.

==== Order Trachycladida ====
===== Family Trachycladidae =====
- Trachycladus spinispirulifer (Carter, 1879), syn, Spirastrella dilatata Kieschnick, 1896, Spirastrella spinispirulifera (Carter, 1879), Suberites spinispirulifer Carter, 1879. Orange wall sponge, Encrusting solid sponge

=== Subclass Keratosa ===
==== Order Dendroceratida ====
===== Family Darwinellidae =====
- Darwinella warreni Topsent, 1905

==== Order Dictyoceratida ====
===== Family Dysideidae =====
- Dysidea cinerea Keller, 1889, syn. Spongelia cinerea (Keller, 1889).
- Dysidea fragilis (Montagu, 1814), syn. Spongelia fistularis Schmidt, 1864.

===== Family Irciniidae =====
- Ircinia aruensis (Hentschel, 1912), syn. Hippospongia aruensis (Hentschel, 1912), Hircinia aruensis Hentschel, 1912.
- Ircinia ramosa (Keller, 1889), syn. Hircinia ramosa Keller, 1889, Hippospongia frondosa Hentschel, 1912.
- Psammocinia arenosa (Lendenfeld, 1888), syn. Hircinia arenosa Lendenfeld, 1888.
- Sarcotragus australis (Lendenfeld, 1888), syn. Ircinia arbuscula (Lendenfeld, 1889), Hircinia australis Lendenfeld, 1888, Hircinia arbuscula Lendenfeld, 1889. Black stink sponge

===== Family Spongiidae =====
- Leiosella caliculata Lendenfeld, 1889

===== Family Thorectidae =====
Subfamily Thorectinae

- Fascaplysinopsis reticulata (Hentschel, 1912), syn. Aplysinopsis reticulata Hentschel, 1912. Goose bump sponge

=== Subclass Verongimorpha ===
==== Order Chondrillida ====
===== Family Chondrillidae =====
- Chondrilla australiensis Carter, 1873, syn. Chondrillastra australiensis (Carter, 1873), Chondrilla ternatensis Thiele, 1900, Chondrilla papillata Lendenfeld, 1885, Chondrilla globulifera Keller, 1891, Chondrilla corticata Lendenfeld, 1885, Chondrilla australiensis var. lobata Dendy, 1905.

==== Order Verongiida ====
===== Family Aplysinellidae =====
- Suberea pedunculata (Lévi, 1969), syn. Verongia pedunculata Lévi, 1969.

===== Family Aplysinidae =====
- Aplysina capensis Carter, 1875

===== Family Ianthellidae =====
- Hexadella kirkpatricki Burton, 1926

== Class Hexactinellida ==
=== Subclass Amphidiscophora ===
==== Order Amphidiscosida ====
===== Family Hyalonematidae =====
- Hyalonema (Cyliconema) abyssale (Lévi, 1964), syn. Cyliconema abyssale Lévi, 1964.
- Lophophysema gilchristi Tabachnick & Lévi, 1999

=== Subclass Hexasterophora ===
==== Order Aulocalycoida ====
===== Family Aulocalycidae =====
Subfamily Aulocalycinae

- Aulocalyx irregularis Schulze, 1886

==== Order Lyssacinosida ====
===== Family Rossellidae =====
- Rossella cf. antarctica Carter, 1872 Glass sponge

Subfamily Lanuginellinae

- Caulophacus (Caulophacus) basispinosus Lévi, 1964, syn. Caulophacus basispinosus Lévi, 1964.
- Caulophacus (Caulophacus) galatheae Lévi, 1964, syn. Caulophacus galatheae Lévi, 1964.
- Caulophacus (Caulophacus) latus Schulze, 1886, syn. Caulophacus latus Schulze, 1886.
- Ceratopsion microxephora (Kirkpatrick, 1903), syn. Phakellia microxephora Kirkpatrick, 1903.

===== Family Rossellidae =====
Subfamily Acanthascinae

- Rhabdocalyptus baculifer Schulze, 1904, syn. Acanthascus (Rhabdocalyptus) baculifer (Schulze, 1904), Acanthascus baculifer (Schulze, 1904).
- Rhabdocalyptus plumodigitatus Kirkpatrick, 1901, syn. Acanthascus (Rhabdocalyptus) plumodigitatus (Kirkpatrick, 1901) Acanthascus plumodigitatus (Kirkpatrick, 1901).

Subfamily Lanuginellinae

- Sympagella johnstoni (Schulze, 1886), syn. Aulascus johnstoni Schulze, 1886.

Subfamily Rossellinae

- Crateromorpha (Crateromorpha) lankesteri Kirkpatrick, 1902

===== Family Euplectellidae =====
Subfamily Corbitellinae

- Regadrella phoenix Schmidt, 1880, syn. Regadrella peru Tabachnick, 1990.
