= Streptomyces marinus =

Scientific classification
- Domain: Bacteria
- Kingdom: Bacillati
- Phylum: Actinomycetota
- Class: Actinomycetes
- Order: Streptomycetales
- Family: Streptomycetaceae
- Genus: Streptomyces
- Species: S. marinus

Binomial name
- Streptomyces marinus Khan et al. 2010

Type strain
- DSM 41968, NBRC 105047, Sp080513GE-26

Species of bacterium

Streptomyces marinus is a bacterium species from the genus of Streptomyces which has been isolated from the sponge Haliclona sp. from the coastline from the city Tateyama in Japan.

== See also ==
- List of Streptomyces species
