= Haliclona crowtheri =

Scientific classification
- Kingdom: Animalia
- Phylum: Porifera
- Class: Demospongiae
- Order: Haplosclerida
- Family: Chalinidae
- Genus: Haliclona
- Subgenus: Soestella
- Species: H. crowtheri

Binomial name
- Haliclona crowtheri Goodwin, Brewin & Brickle, 2012

Species of sponge

Haliclona crowtheri is a species of demosponge first found on the coast of South Georgia Island, in the south west Southern Ocean.
