= Tetilla =

Tetilla may refer to:

- Tetilla, a synonym of Dimorphopetalum, a genus of flowering plants
- Tetilla (sponge), a genus of demosponges
- Tetilla cheese
