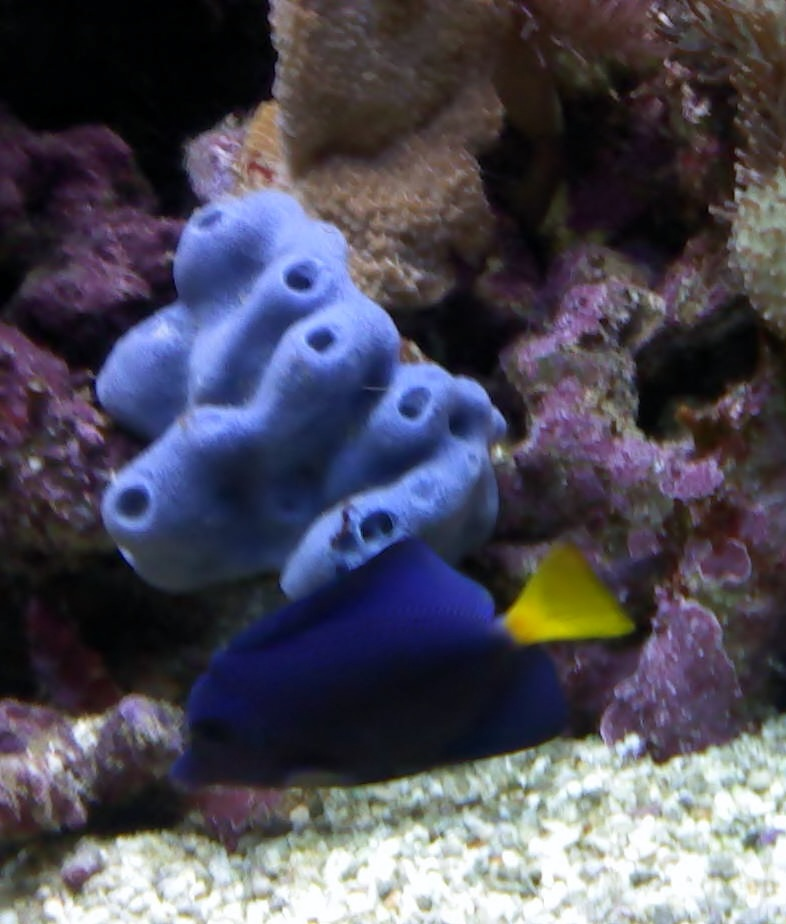
- Haliclona caerulea in a reef aquarium

Scientific classification
- Kingdom: Animalia
- Phylum: Porifera
- Class: Demospongiae
- Order: Haplosclerida
- Family: Chalinidae
- Genus: Haliclona
- Subgenus: Soestella
- Species: H. caerulea

Binomial name
- Haliclona caerulea (Hechtel, 1965)

Synonyms
- Sigmadocia caerulea Hechtel, 1965; Haliclona caerulea (Hechtel, 1965)

= Haliclona caerulea =

Species of sponge

Haliclona caerulea is a species of marine sponge in the family Chalinidae. It is an encrusting tubular sponge that grows anchored on rocky surfaces of coral reefs.

== Name ==
The name of the species comes from the Latin caeruleus and relates to the sponge's colour: cerulean blue, like the sky, or the ocean.

== Morphology ==
Haliclona caerulea takes the form of an encrusting mass of cylindrical to volcano-shaped projections between 2 and 15 cm, with oscula at the high end. The oscula are circular or oval, and between 1.3 and 5.0 mm in diameter. The body has radial symmetry and consists, on the outside, of flattened cells known as pinacocytes. The inner part is formed by cells called choanocytes, equipped with a flagellum. These cells have a dual function: ingesting food particles, and maintaining the flow of water through the sponge's body. Between the two layers a more or less gelatinous substance called mesohyl. Sclerocyte cells are responsible for secreting a kind of skeleton for supporting the sponge's body, formed of spongin fibers.

As its name suggests, the most common color is blue, but individuals may be beige or white.

== Distribution ==
Its geographic distribution includes the western tropical Atlantic, from Florida and the Gulf of Mexico, to the Caribbean Sea, reaching the West Indies and the Pacific coast of Mexico and Panama. is also found on the islands of Hawaii and Guam, where it has been introduced probably via unintended biofouling on the hulls of ships.

== Habitat and ecological roles ==
It is commonly seen growing in beds of the seagrass Thalassia, and in rocky coral rubble habitats. Studies reported their symbiosis with calcareous alga Jania adhaerens.

== Aquaria ==
A sponge going by the name of Haliclona caerulea can sometimes be found in the aquarium trade, though this appears to be Amphimedon texotli.
