= Haliclona djeedara =

Scientific classification
- Kingdom: Animalia
- Phylum: Porifera
- Class: Demospongiae
- Order: Haplosclerida
- Family: Chalinidae
- Genus: Haliclona
- Species: H. djeedara

Binomial name
- Haliclona djeedara Fromont & Abdo, 2014

Species of demosponge from Australia

Type site

Haliclona djeedara is a demosponge, first described by Jane Fromont and David Abdo in 2014. The species epithet, djeedara, means "brown" in Nyoongar.

== Description ==
Haliclona djeedara is a lobed, encrusting and upright sponge, which when alive, is a light brown colour. It has a springy texture and large internal canals. It gives birth to cylindrical planktonic larvae which consist of clumps of ciliated cells. Individuals are either male or female.

== Distribution ==
It is found on limestone reefs at depths of 3–30 m, from Jurien Bay to Bremer Bay in Western Australia.
