= Haliclona elegans =

Scientific classification
- Kingdom: Animalia
- Phylum: Porifera
- Class: Demospongiae
- Order: Haplosclerida
- Family: Chalinidae
- Genus: Haliclona
- Species: H. elegans

Binomial name
- Haliclona elegans (Lendenfeld, 1887)

Synonyms
- Chalinodendron elegans Lendenfeld, 1887

Species of sponge

Haliclona elegans is a species of demosponge in the family Chalinidae. It is found off south-eastern Australia.
