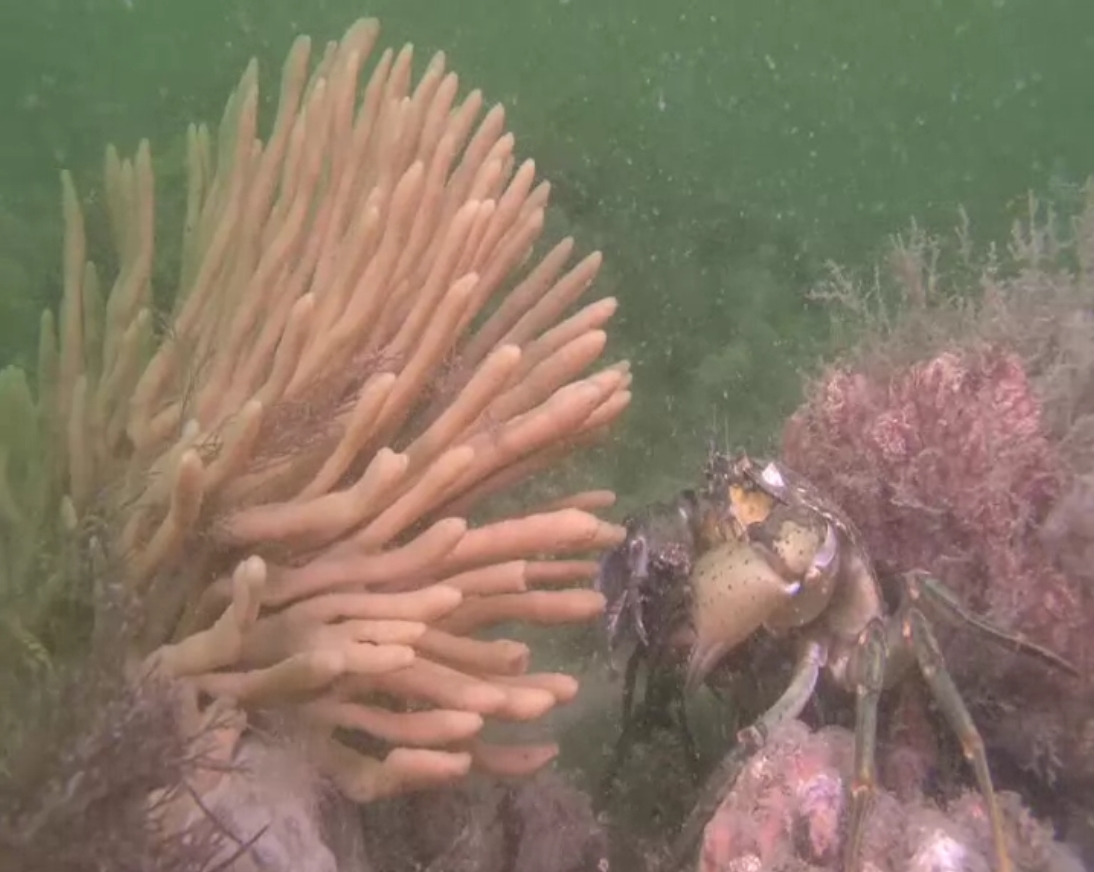
- Specimen in the Netherlands

Conservation status
- Secure (NatureServe)

Scientific classification
- Kingdom: Animalia
- Phylum: Porifera
- Class: Demospongiae
- Order: Haplosclerida
- Family: Chalinidae
- Genus: Haliclona
- Subgenus: Haliclona
- Species: H. oculata

Binomial name
- Haliclona oculata Pallas, 1776

Synonyms
- List: Axinella oculata (Linnaeus, 1759); Axinella oculata tavaresi Bethencourt-Ferreira, 1923; Chalina arbuscula Verrill, 1873; Chalina cervicornis (Pallas, 1766); Chalina grantii Bowerbank, 1866; Chalina oculata (Linnaeus, 1759); Diplodemia vesicula Bowerbank, 1864; Euchalinopsis (Chalina) oculata (Linnaeus, 1759); Euchalinopsis oculata (Linnaeus, 1759); Halichondria cervicornis Johnston, 1842; Halichondria oculata (Linnaeus, 1759); Haliclona occulata Grant, 1841 [lapsus]; Haliclona oculata (Linnaeus, 1759); Isodictya grantii (Bowerbank, 1866); Isodictya pygmaea Bowerbank, 1866; Siphocalina oculata; Spongia cespitosa Rafinesque, 1818; Spongia coalita Müller, 1776; Spongia lanuginosa Esper, 1794; Spongia oculata sensu Pallas, 1766; Spongia oculata Linnaeus, 1759; Veluspa gracilis Miklucho-Maclay, 1870; Veluspa polymorpha Miklucho-Maclay, 1870

= Haliclona oculata =

Species of sponge

Haliclona oculata, sometimes known as the mermaid's glove, finger sponge, or eyed sponge, is a species of sea sponge found in the North Atlantic Ocean at depths ranging from 4 m to approximately 1,000 m, but is often found washed ashore. The species is the type species of the genus Haliclona.

== Distribution ==
Haliclona oculata is found in the North Atlantic Ocean, including European coastal waters.

== Description ==
Haliclona oculata typically grows up to about 30 cm in height and has a soft, flexible texture. The sponge stands erect and grows branches from a short stalk. There may be many slender, round branches or they can grow only a few thick, flattened branches. The color is often yellow or grayish brown but there may be a slight purplish tint. The spicules are oxea and less than 170 μm long.

== Ecology ==
This species is a filter feeder, feeding on suspended particles in the water.
