= Streptomyces haliclonae =

Scientific classification
- Domain: Bacteria
- Kingdom: Bacillati
- Phylum: Actinomycetota
- Class: Actinomycetes
- Order: Streptomycetales
- Family: Streptomycetaceae
- Genus: Streptomyces
- Species: S. haliclonae

Binomial name
- Streptomyces haliclonae Khan et al. 2010

Type strain
- DSM 41970, NBRC 105049, Sp080513SC-31

Species of bacterium

Streptomyces haliclonae is a bacterium species from the genus of Streptomyces which has been isolated from the sponge Haliclona sp in the Chiba prefecture from the coast of Tateyama City in Japan.

== See also ==
- List of Streptomyces species
