= Latrunculia ikematsui =

Scientific classification
- Kingdom: Animalia
- Phylum: Porifera
- Class: Demospongiae
- Order: Poecilosclerida
- Family: Latrunculiidae
- Genus: Latrunculia
- Subgenus: Latrunculia
- Species: L. ikematsui

Binomial name
- Latrunculia ikematsui Tanita, 1968

Synonyms
- Latrunculia (Latrunculia) ikematsui Tanita, 1968

Species of demosponge

Latrunculia ikematsui, is a species of sponge, first described by Senji Tanita in 1968, found in the seas off Japan and Korea.
