= Streptomyces rubrus =

Scientific classification
- Domain: Bacteria
- Kingdom: Bacillati
- Phylum: Actinomycetota
- Class: Actinomycetes
- Order: Streptomycetales
- Family: Streptomycetaceae
- Genus: Streptomyces
- Species: S. rubrus

Binomial name
- Streptomyces rubrus Khan et al 2011

Type strain
- DSM 42030, NBRC 105046, Sp080513KE-34

Synonyms
- Streptomyces rubrum

Species of bacterium

Streptomyces rubrus is a bacterium species from the genus of Streptomyces which has been isolated from the sponge Haliclona sp. in Tateyama, Chiba in Japan.

== See also ==
- List of Streptomyces species
