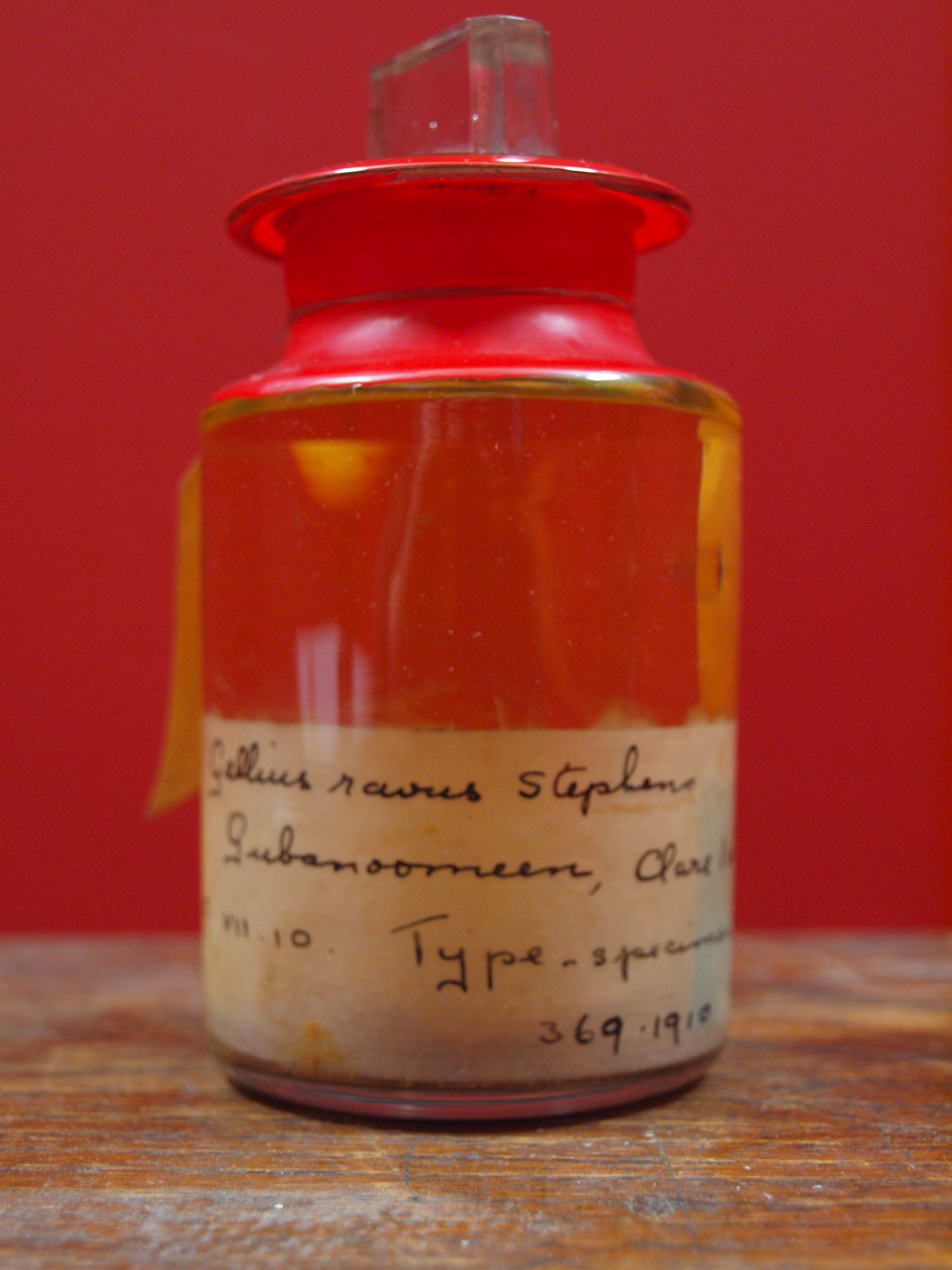
- Type specimen in National Museum of Ireland – Natural History

Scientific classification
- Kingdom: Animalia
- Phylum: Porifera
- Class: Demospongiae
- Order: Haplosclerida
- Family: Chalinidae
- Genus: Haliclona
- Species: H. (G.) rava

Binomial name
- Haliclona (Gellius) rava (Stephens, 1912)

Synonyms
- Gellius ravus Stephens, 1912

= Haliclona rava =

Species of sponge

Haliclona (Gellius) rava is a species of demosponge in the family Chalinidae. It is found off the coast of Ireland.
