= Streptomyces spongiae =

Scientific classification
- Domain: Bacteria
- Kingdom: Bacillati
- Phylum: Actinomycetota
- Class: Actinomycetia
- Order: Streptomycetales
- Family: Streptomycetaceae
- Genus: Streptomyces
- Species: S. spongiae

Binomial name
- Streptomyces spongiae Khan et al. 2011

Type strain
- DSM 42031, NBRC 106415, Sp080513SC-24

Species of bacterium

Streptomyces spongiae is a bacterium species from the genus of Streptomyces which has been isolated from the marine sponge Haliclona in Tateyama in Chiba in Japan.

== See also ==
- List of Streptomyces species
