= Haliclona submonilifera =

Scientific classification
- Kingdom: Animalia
- Phylum: Porifera
- Class: Demospongiae
- Order: Haplosclerida
- Family: Chalinidae
- Genus: Haliclona
- Species: H. submonilifera

Binomial name
- Haliclona submonilifera Uriz, 1988

Deep-water demosponge from the continental shelf and slope off south-west Africa

Haliclona submonilifera, or the bubble bead sponge, is a deep-water demosponge from the continental shelf and slope off south-west Africa.

== Description ==
This straw yellow sponge grows upright, with stalked branches that have numerous swellings and constrictions. These branches end with rounded ends with distinct oscules. Oscules may also occur on rounded elevations along the branches. The surface has a velventy texture. This sponge is very flexible and compressible and is easily torn. It typically grows up to 130 mm (5.1 in) tall and 70 mm (2.8 in). It looks incredibly similar to Haliclona (Haliclona) urizae, another Namibian sponge species, but differs in having megascleres with blunt or rounded edges. More samples are needed to determine whether these are in actuality two different species or not.

== Distribution and habitat ==
This species occurs along the continental shelf and slope off south-west Africa. It is known to occur at depths from around 245 m (804 ft) off the coasts of Namibia and northern South Africa.
