= Latrunculia biformis =

Scientific classification
- Kingdom: Animalia
- Phylum: Porifera
- Class: Demospongiae
- Order: Poecilosclerida
- Family: Latrunculiidae
- Genus: Latrunculia
- Subgenus: Latrunculia
- Species: L. biformis

Binomial name
- Latrunculia biformis (Kirkpatrick, 1908)

Synonyms
- Latrunculia apicalis var. biformis (Kirkpatrick, 1908); Latrunculia biformis (Kirkpatrick, 1908)

Species of deep-sea demosponge from the southern hemisphere

Latrunculia biformis, the mud-clump sponge, is a widespread deep sea demosponge from the southern hemisphere.

== Description ==
This tough and firm sponge is chocolate brown or olive green in colour and grows up to 90 millimetres (3.5 inches) in length and 80 millimetres (3.1 inches) in width. They are semi-spherical or ovoid in shape, with the surface covered in conical, volcano-shaped oscules and flattened disk-like projections.

=== Spicules ===
- Megascleres: Anisostyles that are smooth and straight or curved. The apical extremity is needle-like.
- Microscleres: Aciculodiscorhabds are very similar to anisodiscorhabds, only differing in having a well developed spined apical projection.

== Distribution and habitat ==
This species is widely distributed across the southern hemisphere. It is a deep sea sponge and has been found at a depth of 18–1,080 m (59–3,543 ft). It is known from the coasts of southwest Africa, Río de la Plata in South America, and the Antarctic and Subantarctic regions.

== Biologically important compounds ==
As is the case with the majority of the species in its genus, the mud-clump sponge contains chemical compounds which are of medical interest. These include several discorhabdins with anti-cancer properties. Additionally, an extracted tridiscorhabdin has been shown to exhibit highly cytotoxic activity against human colon cancer cells. Extracted lipids have also been shown to have strong antioxidative properties.
