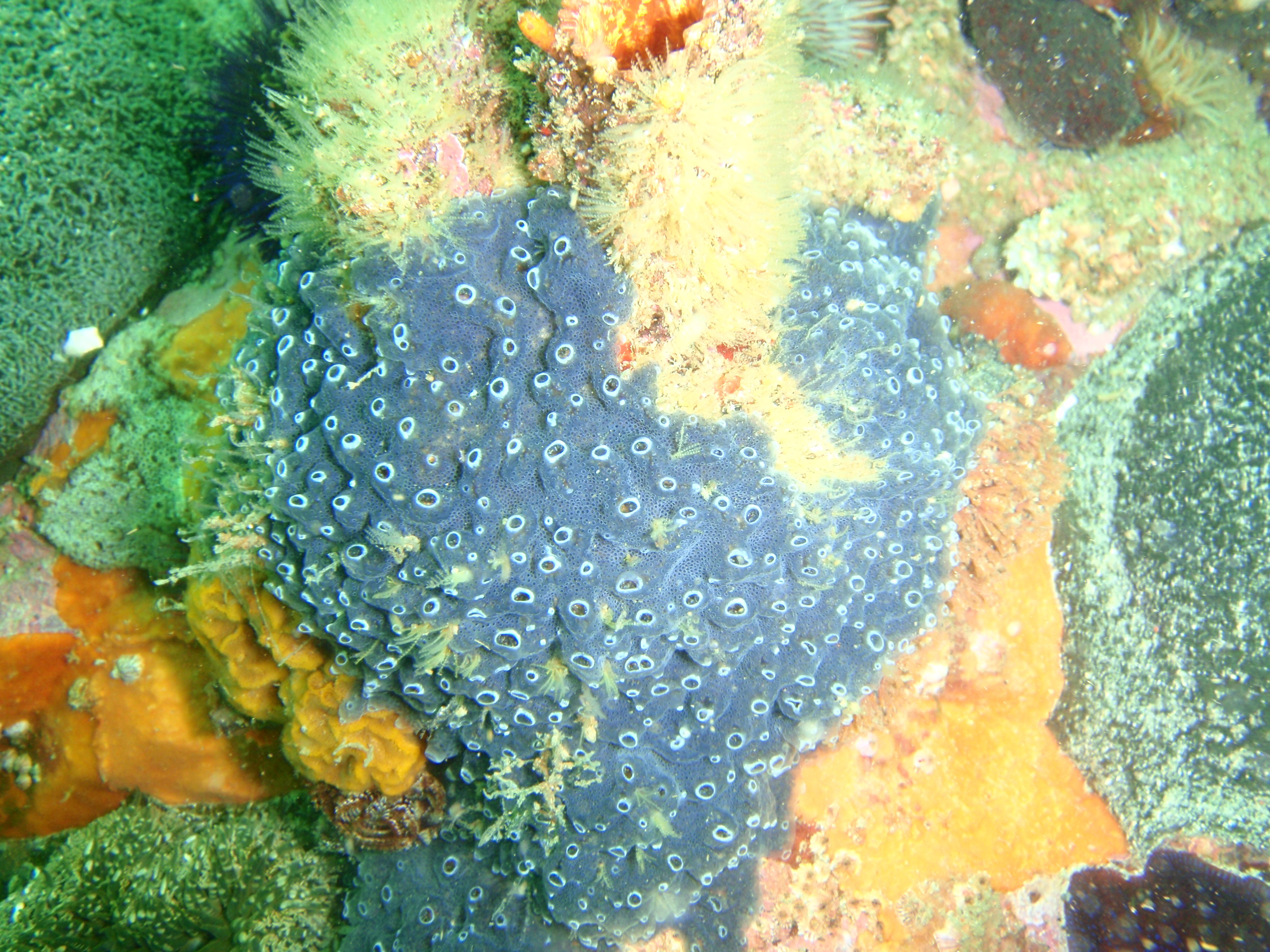

Scientific classification
- Domain: Eukaryota
- Kingdom: Animalia
- Phylum: Porifera
- Class: Demospongiae
- Order: Haplosclerida
- Family: Chalinidae
- Genus: Haliclona
- Subgenus: Haliclona
- Species: H. stilensis

Binomial name
- Haliclona stilensis Burton, 1933

= Haliclona stilensis =

Species of sponge

Haliclona stilensis, the encrusting turret sponge, is a species of demosponge. It is known around the southern African coast, from Namibia to the South African south coast.

== Description ==
Haliclona stilensis grows to about 1 cm thick. It is a thinly encrusting sponge which is highly variable in both shape and colour. It may be encrusting with small turrets or form branching structures with tall turrets. Turrets have large oscula at their apexes. Its colour ranges from beige to dark purple.

== Habitat ==
This sponge lives from the subtidal zone and down to at least 15m underwater. It may encrust mussels or other hard surfaces or be found under stones in sheltered to moderately exposed areas.
