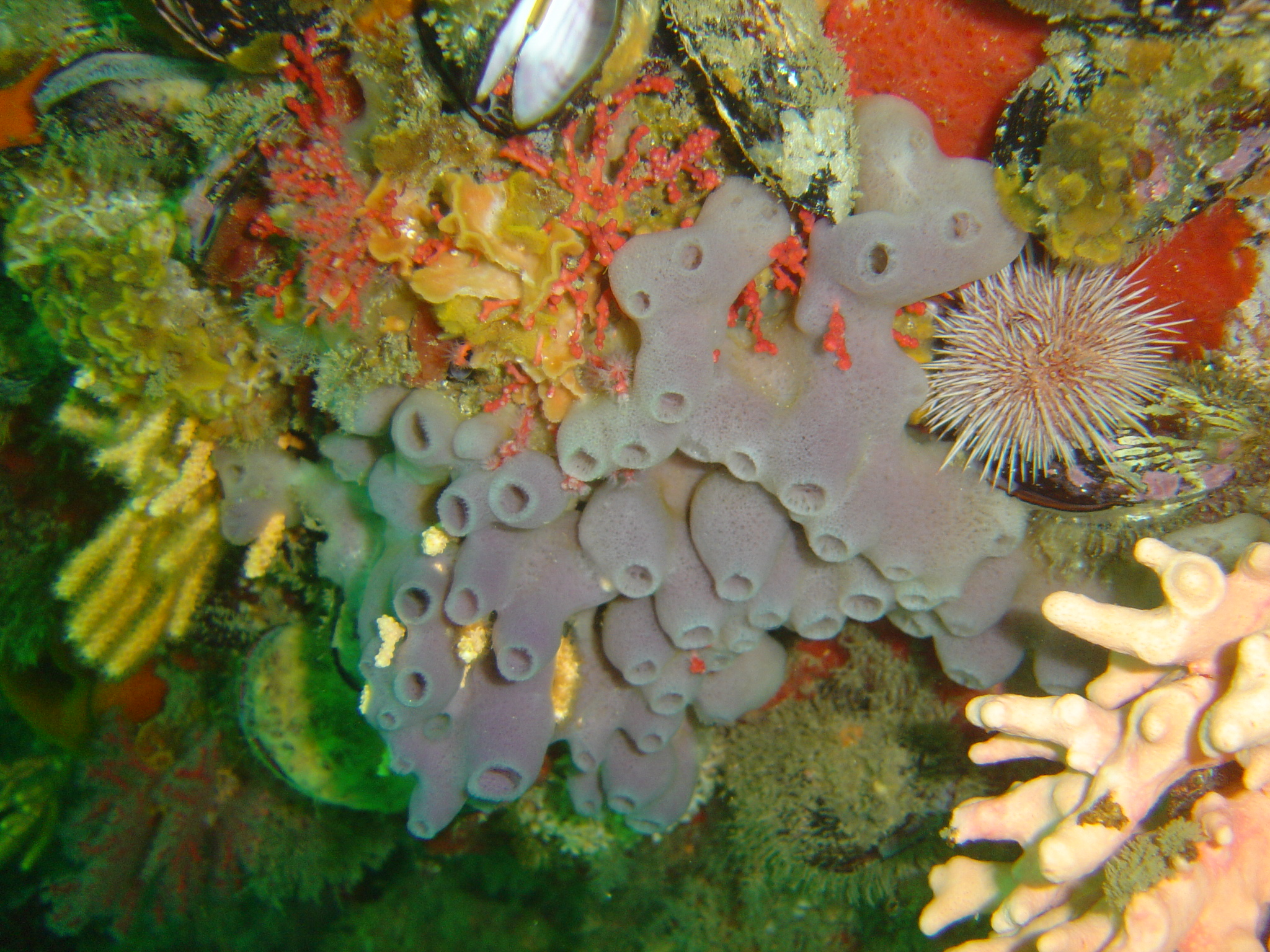

Scientific classification
- Kingdom: Animalia
- Phylum: Porifera
- Class: Demospongiae
- Order: Haplosclerida
- Family: Chalinidae
- Genus: Haliclona
- Subgenus: Haliclona
- Species: H. anonyma

Binomial name
- Haliclona anonyma (Stephens, 1915)

Synonyms
- Haliclona anonyma (Stephens, 1915); Siphonochalina anonyma Stephens, 1915

= Haliclona anonyma =

Species of sponge

Haliclona anonyma, the turret sponge or tubular fan sponge, is a species of demosponge. It is endemic to South Africa, where it occurs between the Cape Peninsula and Sodwana Bay.

== Description ==
Haliclona anonyma grows to about 50 cm (20 in) across and has turrets of up to 15 cm (5.9 in) long. It is a pink to purplish or brown many-turreted sponge, which grows in sheets usually on vertical walls. The coalescent (fused) tubular branches terminate in rounded ends with slightly raised conspicuous oscules. Its surface is slightly bristly with small ostia (channels allowing for water movement), and its texture is soft and compressible.

== Distribution and habitat ==
This sponge is endemic to the south and west coasts of South Africa. It occurs from the intertidal zone. It has been found to occur down to 144 m (472 ft) in depth. They are frequently attached to rocks by coralline algae which grows between the sponge matrix.
