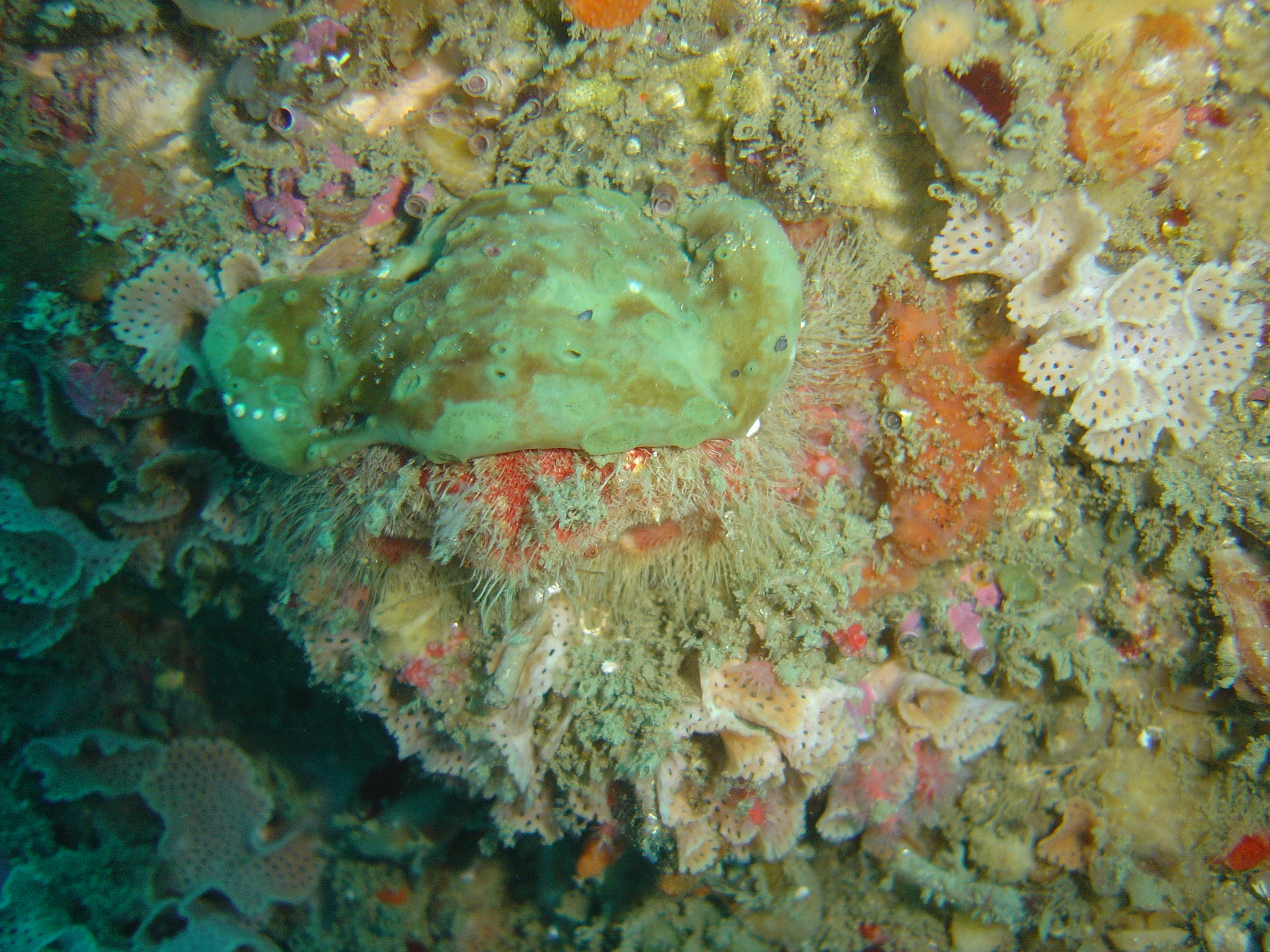
- Latrunculia (Biannulata) lunaviridis on a crab

Scientific classification
- Domain: Eukaryota
- Kingdom: Animalia
- Phylum: Porifera
- Class: Demospongiae
- Order: Poecilosclerida
- Family: Latrunculiidae
- Genus: Latrunculia (du Bocage, 1869)

Subgenera and species
- See text

Synonyms
- Microstylifer (Vacelet, 1969)

= Latrunculia =

Genus of demosponges

Latrunculia is a genus of demosponges. It is well known for the diverse array of chemical compounds found in its species, including the latrunculins, which are named after this genus. Many of these are medically important, including anti-cancer compounds such as discorhabdins.

== Description ==
The majority of species are large. They have special pore-areas and oscules encircled by elevated collars. The skeleton is formed by siliceous spicules in which one end is rounded. These arranged in an irregular network of loose tracts or bundles, supporting a crust of discorhabds, a microsclere typical of the genus.

== Distribution and habitat ==
Latrunculia contains cold-adapted species. They are common off southern hemisphere coastlines. Species are known from the Arctic and Antarctic, the Atlantic and Indian oceans, the Caribbean, Mediterranean, and Red seas.

== Species ==
The following species are recognised:

Subgenus Latrunculia (Biannulata) (Samaai, Gibbons & Kelly, 2006)

- Latrunculia (Biannulata) algoaensis (Samaai, Janson & Kelly, 2012)
- Latrunculia (Biannulata) citharistae (Vacelet, 1969)
- Latrunculia (Biannulata) duckworthi (Alvarez, Bergquist & Battershill, 2002)
- Latrunculia (Biannulata) gotzi (Samaai, Janson & Kelly, 2012)
- Latrunculia (Biannulata) janeirensis (Cordonis, Moraes & Muricy, 2012)
- Latrunculia (Biannulata) kaakaariki (Alvarez, Bergquist & Battershill, 2002)
- Latrunculia (Biannulata) kaikoura (Alvarez, Bergquist & Battershill, 2002)
- Latrunculia (Biannulata) kerwathi (Samaai, Janson & Kelly, 2012)
- Latrunculia (Biannulata) lincfreesei `(Kelly, Reiswig & Samaai, 2016)
- Green moon sponge Latrunculia (Biannulata) lunaviridis (Samaai & Kelly, 2003)
- Latrunculia (Biannulata) microacanthoxea (Samaai & Kelly, 2003)
- Latrunculia (Biannulata) millerae (Alvarez, Bergquist & Battershill, 2002)
- Latrunculia (Biannulata) procumbens (Alvarez, Bergquist & Battershill, 2002)
- Latrunculia (Biannulata) purpurea (Carter, 1881)
- Latrunculia (Biannulata) spinispiraefera (Brøndsted, 1924)
- Latrunculia (Biannulata) triloba (Schmidt, 1875)
- Latrunculia (Biannulata) wellingtonensis (Alvarez, Bergquist & Battershill, 2002)

Subgenus Latrunculia (Latrunculia) (du Bocage, 1869)

- Latrunculia (Latrunculia) apicalis (Ridley & Dendy, 1886)
- Latrunculia (Latrunculia) austini (Samaai, Gibbons & Kelly, 2006)
- Latrunculia (Latrunculia) basalis (Kirkpatrick, 1908)
- Mud-clump sponge Latrunculia (Latrunculia) biformis (Kirkpatrick, 1908)
- Latrunculia (Latrunculia) bocagei (Ridley & Dendy, 1886)
- Latrunculia (Latrunculia) brevis (Ridley & Dendy, 1886)
- Latrunculia (Latrunculia) ciruela (Hajdu, Desqueyroux-Faúndez, Carvalho, Lôbo-Hajdu & Willenz, 2013)
- Latrunculia (Latrunculia) copihuensis (Hajdu, Desqueyroux-Faúndez, Carvalho, Lôbo-Hajdu & Willenz, 2013)
- Latrunculia (Latrunculia) cratera (du Bocage, 1869)
- Latrunculia (Latrunculia) crenulata (Lévi, 1993)
- Latrunculia (Latrunculia) fiordensis (Alvarez, Bergquist & Battershill, 2002)
- Latrunculia (Latrunculia) hamanni (Kelly, Reiswig & Samaai, 2016)
- Latrunculia (Latrunculia) ikematsui (Tanita, 1968)
- Latrunculia (Latrunculia) multirotalis (Topsent, 1927)
- Latrunculia (Latrunculia) novaecaledoniae (Samaai, Gibbons & Kelly, 2006)
- Latrunculia (Latrunculia) oxydiscorhabda (Alvarez, Bergquist & Battershill, 2002)
- Latrunculia (Latrunculia) palmata (Lévi, 1964)
- Latrunculia (Latrunculia) tetraverticillata (Mothes, Campos, Eckert & Lerner, 2008)
- Latrunculia (Latrunculia) triverticillata (Alvarez, Bergquist & Battershill, 2002)
- Latrunculia (Latrunculia) verenae (Hajdu, Desqueyroux-Faúndez, Carvalho, Lôbo-Hajdu & Willenz, 2013)
- Latrunculia (Latrunculia) yepayek (Hajdu, Desqueyroux-Faúndez, Carvalho, Lôbo-Hajdu & Willenz, 2013)

Subgenus Latrunculia (Uniannulata) (Kelly, Reiswig & Samaai, 2016)

- Latrunculia (Uniannulata) oparinae (Samaai & Krasokhin, 2002)
- Latrunculia (Uniannulata) velera (Lehnert, Stone & Heimler, 2006)

No subgenus

- Latrunculia rugosa (Vacelet, 1969)
- Latrunculia sceptrellifera (Carter, 1887)
