= Tetilla capillosa =

Scientific classification
- Kingdom: Animalia
- Phylum: Porifera
- Class: Demospongiae
- Order: Tetractinellida
- Family: Tetillidae
- Genus: Tetilla
- Species: T. capillosa

Binomial name
- Tetilla capillosa Lévi, 1967

Species of sponge from southern Africa

Tetilla capillosa, the furry sponge, is a species of demosponge from southern Africa.

== Description ==
This brown to grey-green sponge has a hemispherical to ovoid form. It is firm and tough and typically grows to be 60 mm (2.4 in) wide. The surface is completely covered in outward projecting spicules which may be up to 4 mm (0.16 in) long. It has a single large oscule (4–6 mm (0.16–0.24 in)) at the top. The cortex is undifferentiated.

=== Spicules ===
The following spicules make up the skeleton of this species:

- Protriaenes (spicules with three short prongs projecting forwards from one end of a longer ray) and prodiaenes (two prongs instead of three) with straight branches pointing upwards. The part of the spicule from which the prongs protrude is initially straight, but curves towards the base.
- Anatrienes (megasceleres with one long and three short rays) which may be curved towards the end.
- Straight oxeas (needle-like spicules with pointed ends) that are noticeable asymmetrical.
- Very thin and slightly rough sigmaspires (spirally curved s-shaped spicules).

=== Skeleton ===
Tracts of protriaenes, anatrienes and oxeas form a form a radial or spiral skeleton. They pierce the ectosome. These projecting spicules are soft and fuzzy. This is where the common name of the species comes from. Scattered oxeas are also present between these tracts. Sigmaspires are abundant throughout the sponge.

== Distribution and habitat ==
This species is found on the south and west coasts of southern Africa. It is found living at depths of 227–474 m (745–1,555 ft) off the coasts of South Africa and Namibia.
