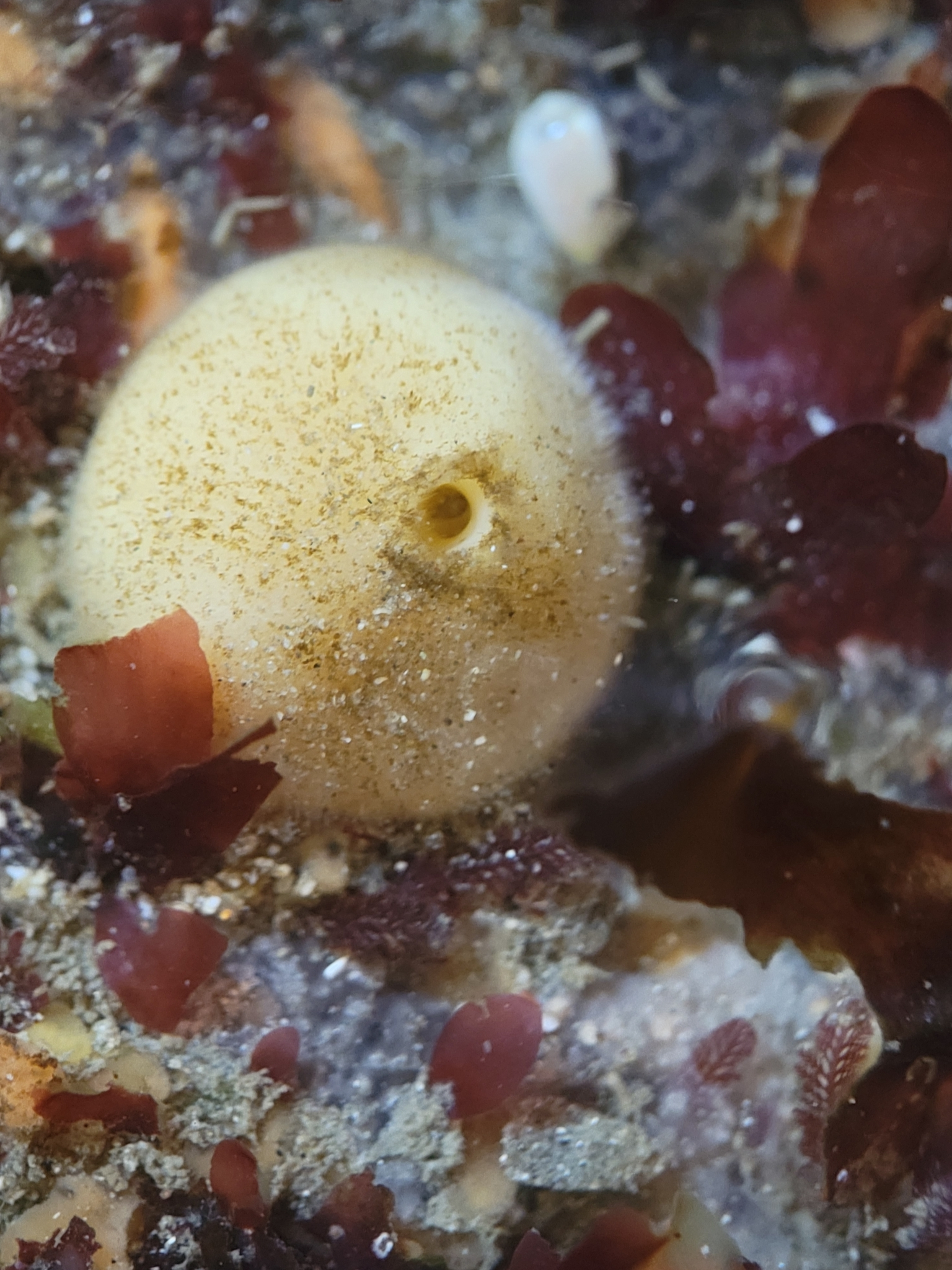

Scientific classification
- Kingdom: Animalia
- Phylum: Porifera
- Class: Demospongiae
- Order: Tetractinellida
- Family: Tetillidae
- Genus: Tetilla; Schmidt, 1868

Type species
- Tetilla euplocamos Schmidt, 1868

Species
- See text.

Synonyms
- Casula Gray, 1872; Chrotella Sollas, 1886; Dactylella Gray, 1872; Ectyonilla Ferrer Hernández, 1914; Kaira Laubenfels, 1936; Trachygellius Topsent, 1894

= Tetilla (sponge) =

Genus of sponges

Tetilla is a genus of demosponges in the family Tetillidae. It is widely distributed. They are mainly found in deeper habitats.

== Description ==
These globular sponges lack porocalices (special pore bearing pits) and auxiliary megascleres. The surface is covered with conical elevations (conules) or uniformly covered in minute spines. They have few oscules. These are typically located at the top. Spicule strands at the base act as a root system, attaching the sponge to the substrate. There is no visible cortex when a cross-section is taken.

The spirally radiate skeleton is made of bundles of oxeas (needle-shaped spicules) originating from the center of the sponge. These become mixed with triaenes (elongated spicules with three rays at one end), mainly protriaenes. The microscleres are sigmaspires (a spirally twisted s-shaped spicule). These are absent in the type species (T. euplocamos).

== Species ==
The following species are recognised:

- Tetilla africana Lévi, 1959
- Tetilla amphiacantha (Topsent, 1904)
- Tetilla anamonaena (Tanita, 1968)
- Tetilla australis Bergquist, 1968
- Tetilla barodensis Dendy, 1916
- Tetilla bonaventura Kirkpatrick, 1902
- Tetilla capillosa Lévi, 1967
- Tetilla casula (Carter, 1871)
- Tetilla ciliata Wilson, 1925
- Tetilla coronida Sollas, 1888
- Tetilla dactyloidea (Carter, 1869)
- Tetilla diaenophora Lévi, 1958
- Tetilla disigmata Lévi, 1964
- Tetilla ellipsoida (Hoshino, 1982)
- Tetilla enoi Brøndsted, 1934
- Tetilla euplocamos Schmidt, 1868
- Tetilla falcipara Lévi, 1993
- Tetilla furcifer Dendy, 1922
- Tetilla geniculata Marenzeller, 1886
- Tetilla ginzan Tanita, 1965
- Tetilla gladius (Lendenfeld, 1907)
- Tetilla globosa (Carter, 1886)
- Tetilla hebes (Lendenfeld, 1907)
- Tetilla hwasunensis Shim & Sim, 2011
- Tetilla japonica Lampe, 1886
- Tetilla koreana Rho & Sim, 1981
- Tetilla laminaris George & Wilson, 1919
- Tetilla limicola Dendy, 1905
- Tetilla microxea Bergquist, 1965
- Tetilla muricyi Fernandez, Peixinho, Pinheiro & Menegola, 2011
- Tetilla mutabilis de Laubenfels, 1930
- Tetilla nimia (Topsent, 1927)
- Tetilla pedifera Sollas, 1886
- Tetilla pedonculata Lévi, 1967
- Tetilla pentatriaena Fernandez, Peixinho, Pinheiro & Menegola, 2011
- Tetilla pilula Dendy, 1916
- Tetilla poculifera Dendy, 1905
- Tetilla praecipua Wiedenmayer, 1989
- Tetilla quirimure (Peixinho, Cosme & Hajdu, 2005)
- Tetilla radiata Selenka, 1879
- Tetilla raphidiophora (Lendenfeld, 1888)
- Tetilla repens (Sarà, 1958)
- Tetilla ridleyi Sollas, 1888
- Tetilla rodriguesi Fernandez, Peixinho, Pinheiro & Menegola, 2011
- Tetilla rugosa (Carter, 1886)
- Tetilla sandalina Sollas, 1886
- Tetilla sansibarica (Lendenfeld, 1907)
- Tetilla schulzei Kieschnick, 1898
- Tetilla serica (Lebwohl, 1914)
- Tetilla sibirica (Fristedt, 1887)
- Tetilla sigmophora (Schmidt, 1870)
- Tetilla simplex (Sollas, 1886)
- Tetilla spinosa Wilson, 1925
- Tetilla truncata Topsent, 1890
