= Grey wall sponge =

Scientific classification
- Kingdom: Animalia
- Phylum: Porifera
- Class: Demospongiae
- Order: Tetractinellida
- Family: Ancorinidae
- Genus: Stelletta
- Species: S. agulhana

Binomial name
- Stelletta agulhana Lendenfeld, 1907

Species of demosponge in the family Ancorinidae from South Africa

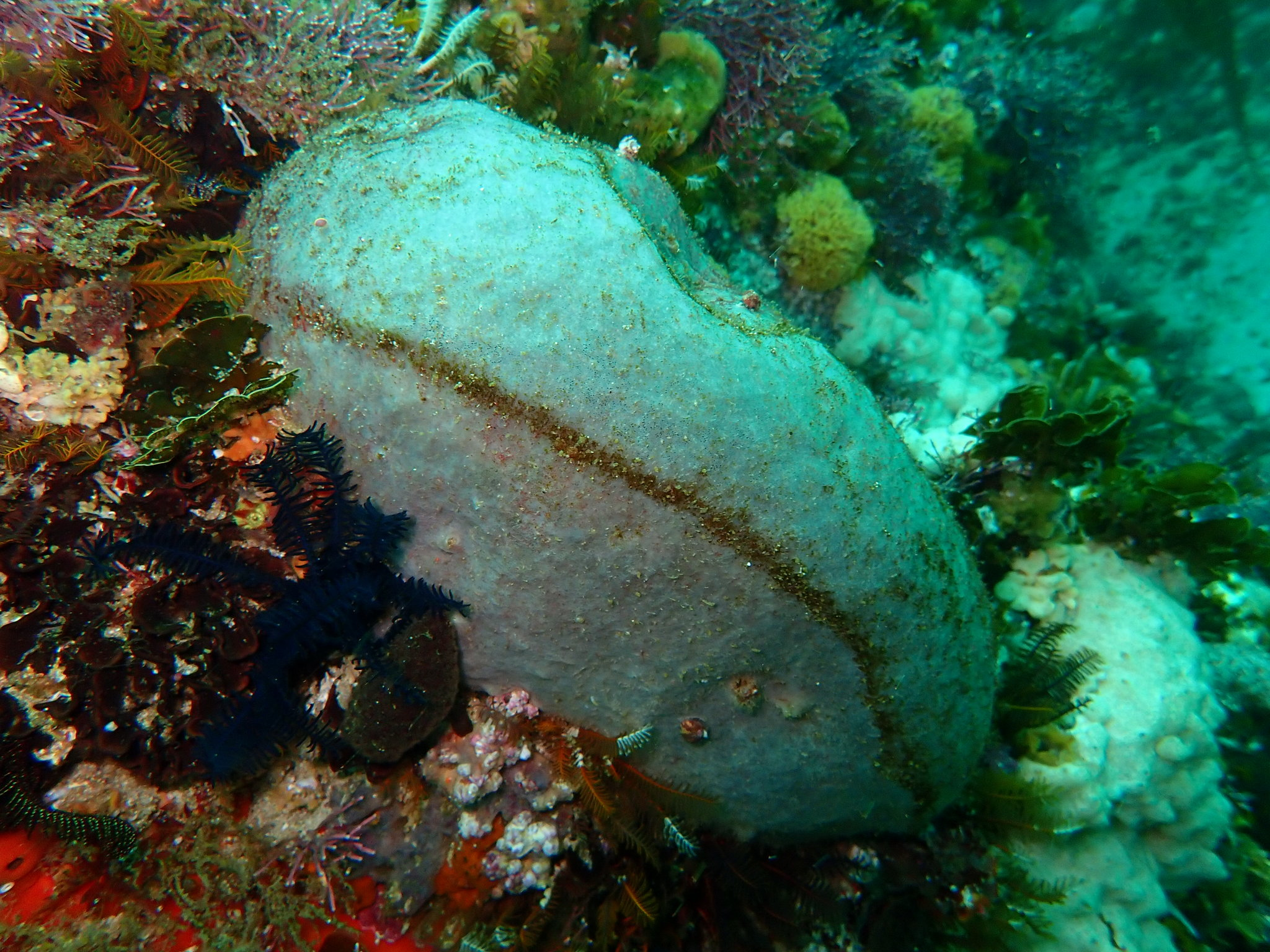
grey wall sponge (Stelletta agulhana); City of Cape Town, Western Cape, South Africa

The grey wall sponge (Stelletta agulhana) is a species of sea sponge belonging to the family Ancorinidae. It is found around the coast of Southern Africa from the Northern Cape to KwaZulu-Natal. It is an endemic species.

== Description ==
The grey wall sponge may grow to 10 cm thick and 40–50 cm in length. It is a massive grey sponge with fine spicules protruding from its surface. It has a stony texture, with small oscula visible on the upper surface.

== Habitat ==
This sponge lives on rocky reefs in 2-90m of water.
