= Tetilla casula =

Scientific classification
- Kingdom: Animalia
- Phylum: Porifera
- Class: Demospongiae
- Order: Tetractinellida
- Family: Tetillidae
- Genus: Tetilla
- Species: T. casula

Binomial name
- Tetilla casula (Carter, 1871)

Synonyms
- Casula casula (Carter, 1871); Tethya casula Carter, 1871

Species of sponge

Tetilla casula, the volcano sponge, is a species of demosponge from the south coast of South Africa.

== Description ==
The volcano sponge consists of a pale yellow to light green-grey hemispherical head on a conical or umbrella-like expansion that is embedded in the sand. It tends to grow up to 30 mm (1.2 in) tall and have a base with a circumference of up to 50 mm (2.0 in).

The head is rough and covered in lines of projecting spicules. These projections tend to be the longest at the bottom, where they are continuous with those of the conical expansion. Those at the top, by contrast, tend to be short and upright. Slightly raised semi-spherical oscules are clustered at the top.

The conical expansion is smooth and thins towards the circumference, where they form a circular fringed border. This is mostly concealed by the sand in which this species lives. It is made of long overlapping spicules arranged in parallel bundles. They radiate from a common center in continuation with the lowest spicules of the head, extending downwards into the sand.

Pores mostly occur on the upper part of the head while vents are found in the larger polygonal interspaces at the base. The conival expansion has a few pores and vents.

=== Spicules ===
Five kinds of spicules make up the skeleton of this species. These are:

- Long spicules (average length:10.6 mm (0.42 in)) with a delicate, smooth shaft with a pointed end on the interior end and a three pronged forked end pointing outwards.
- Long needle-like spicules (average length: 5.1 mm (0.20 in)).
- Short, stout and curved spicules (average length: 1.4 mm (0.055 in)).
- Minute spicules (average length: 0.4 mm (0.016 in)) with a highly flexible shaft. They end in point on the interior end and a two or three pronged fork on the outer end.
- Minute double hooked c- or s-shaped spicules (average length: 0.01 mm (0.00039 in)).

=== Skeleton ===
Only the two longest spicule types are found in the conical expansion. The fringe of this expansion is formed solely of the forked ends of the longest spicules. The three smaller spicule types are found only in the head, where they dominate. Shorter versions of the spicules that make up the expansion are also found in this region.

== Distribution and habitat ==
This species is known from the south coast of South Africa. While it has been found between KwaZulu-Natal and the Cape of Good Hope, it is most common between Gqeberha and the Cape. It is found growing on sandy substrates. It is found living at depths of 4–77 m (13–253 ft).
