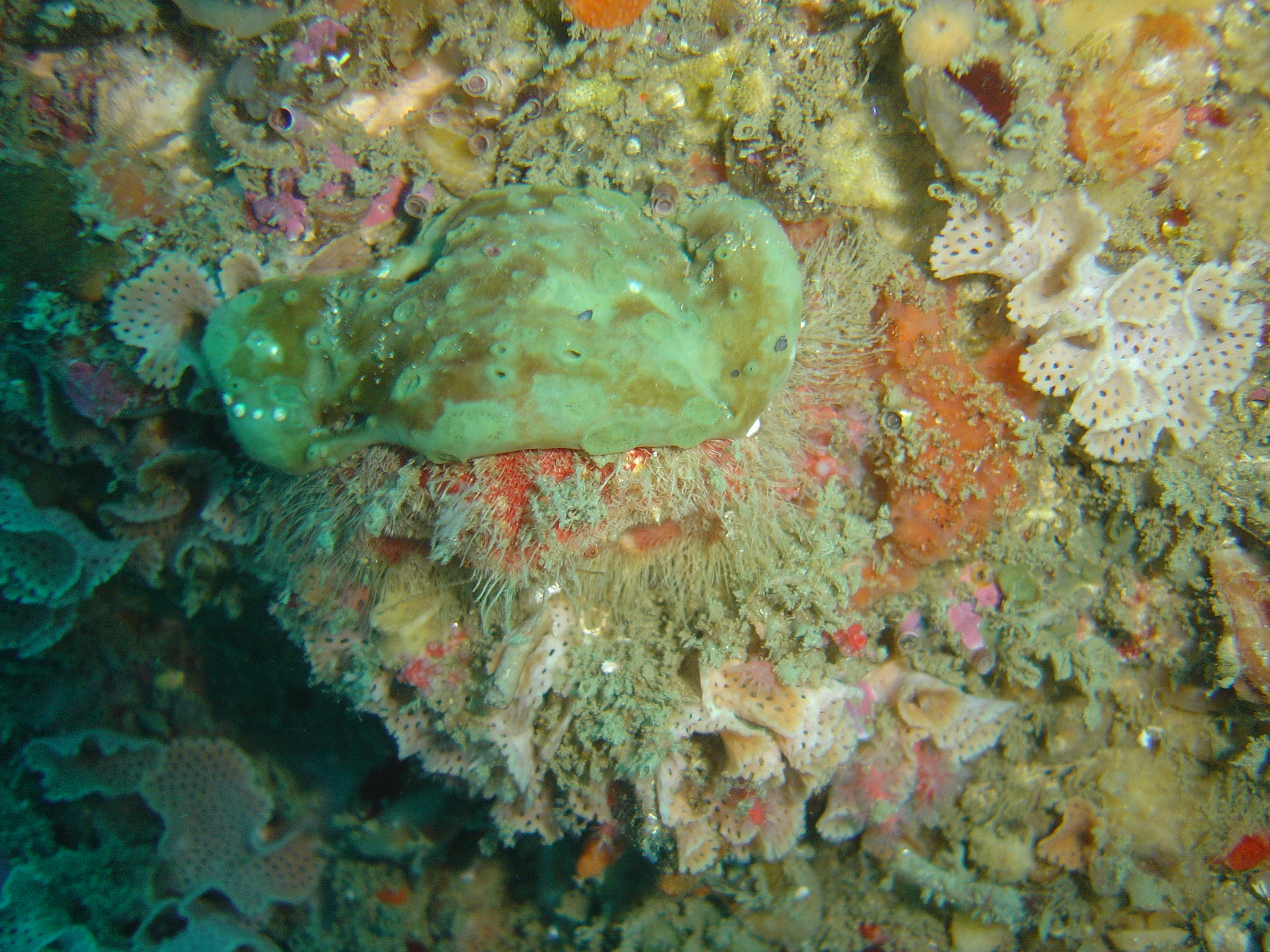

Scientific classification
- Domain: Eukaryota
- Kingdom: Animalia
- Phylum: Porifera
- Class: Demospongiae
- Order: Poecilosclerida
- Family: Latrunculiidae

= Latrunculiidae =

Family of sponges

Latrunculiidae is a family of sponges belonging to the order Poecilosclerida.

Genera:

- Bomba Kelly, Reiswig & Samaai, 2016
- Cyclacanthia Samaai & Kelly, 2004
- Latrunclava Kelly, Reiswig & Samaai, 2016
- Latrunculia du Bocage, 1869
- Sceptrella Schmidt, 1870
- Strongylodesma Lévi, 1969
- Tsitsikamma Samaai & Kelly, 2002
