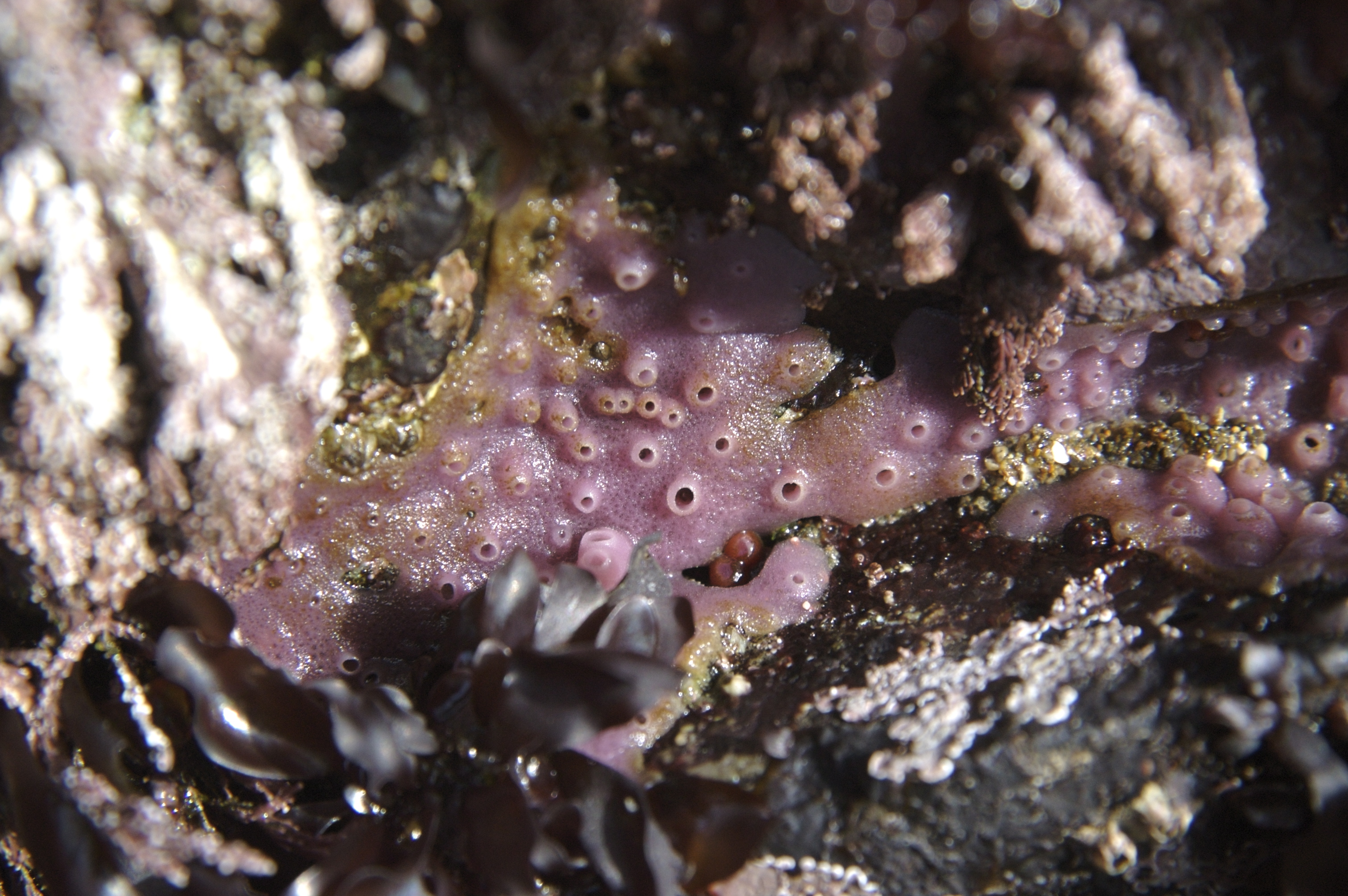
- Haliclona permollis

Scientific classification
- Kingdom: Animalia
- Phylum: Porifera
- Class: Demospongiae
- Order: Haplosclerida
- Family: Chalinidae
- Genus: Haliclona; Grant, 1836

Synonyms
- Pellinula Czerniavsky, 1880; Protoschmidtia Czerniavsky, 1880; Tedaniella Czerniavsky, 1880

= Haliclona =

Genus of sponges

Haliclona is a genus of demosponges in the family Chalinidae.

== Species ==
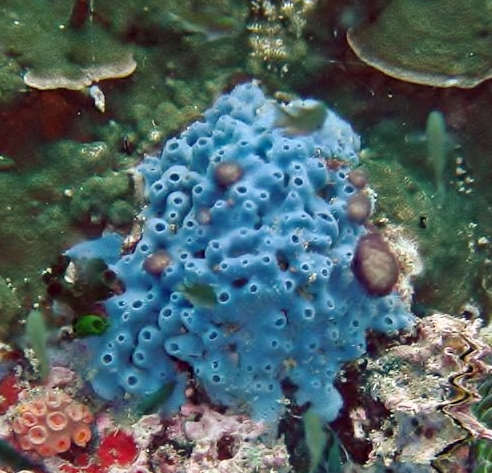
Haliclona sp. in Thailand

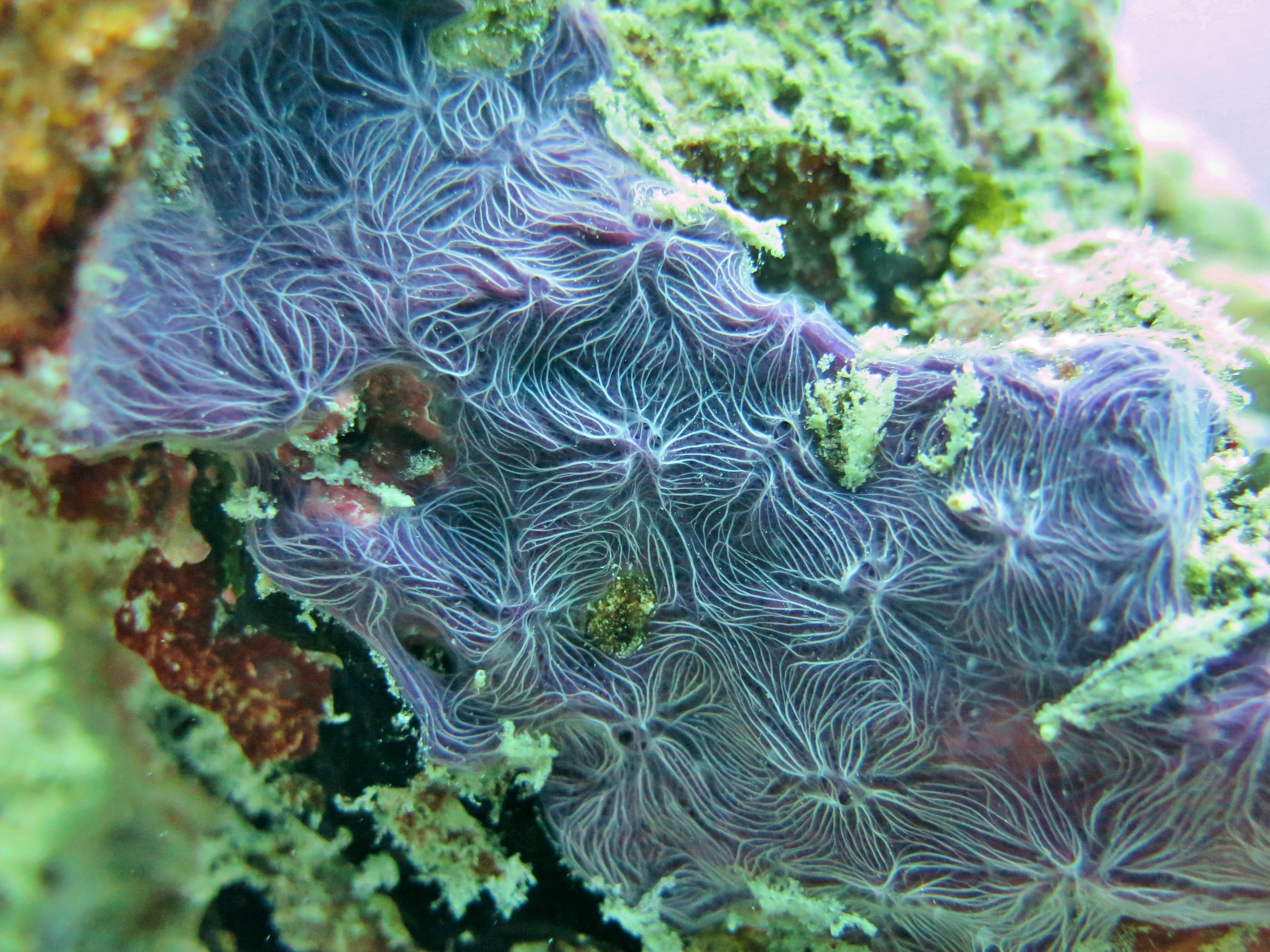
Haliclona nematifera

The following species are recognised in the genus Haliclona:

Subgenus Haliclona (Flagellia) Van Soest, 2017

- Haliclona (Flagellia) amirantensis Van Soest, 2017
- Haliclona (Flagellia) anataria (Lévi & Lévi, 1983)
- Haliclona (Flagellia) edaphus De Laubenfels, 1930
- Haliclona (Flagellia) flagellifera (Ridley & Dendy, 1886)
- Haliclona (Flagellia) hajdui Van Soest, 2017
- Haliclona (Flagellia) hamata (Thiele, 1903)
- Haliclona (Flagellia) hentscheli Van Soest, 2017
- Haliclona (Flagellia) hiberniae Van Soest, 2017
- Haliclona (Flagellia) indonesiae Van Soest, 2017
- Haliclona (Flagellia) porosa (Fristedt, 1887)
- Haliclona (Flagellia) xenomorpha Dinn, 2020

Subgenus Haliclona (Gellius) Gray, 1867

- Haliclona (Gellius) amboinensis (Lévi, 1961)
- Haliclona (Gellius) anatarius (Lévi & Lévi, 1983)
- Haliclona (Gellius) angulata (Bowerbank, 1866)
- Haliclona (Gellius) arnesenae (Arndt, 1927)
- Haliclona (Gellius) binaria (Topsent, 1927)
- Haliclona (Gellius) bioxeata (Boury-Esnault, Pansini & Uriz, 1994)
- Haliclona (Gellius) borzatii (Sarà, 1978)
- Haliclona (Gellius) bubastes (Row, 1911)
- Haliclona (Gellius) calcinea (Burton, 1954)
- Haliclona (Gellius) carduus (Ridley & Dendy, 1886)
- Haliclona (Gellius) cellaria (Rao, 1941)
- Haliclona (Gellius) ceratina (Ridley, 1884)
- Haliclona (Gellius) claudelevii Van Soest & Hooper, 2020
- Haliclona (Gellius) constans (Boury-Esnault & van Beveren, 1982)
- Haliclona (Gellius) coreana Kim & Sim, 2004
- Haliclona (Gellius) cucurbitiformis (Kirkpatrick, 1907)
- Haliclona (Gellius) cymaeformis (Esper, 1806)
- Haliclona (Gellius) depellens (Topsent, 1908)
- Haliclona (Gellius) dubia (Babic, 1922)
- Haliclona (Gellius) emilei Van Soest & Hooper, 2020
- Haliclona (Gellius) emiletopsenti Van Soest & Hooper, 2020
- Haliclona (Gellius) fibulata (Schmidt, 1862)
- Haliclona (Gellius) flabelliformis (Ridley & Dendy, 1886)
- Haliclona (Gellius) forcipata (Thiele, 1903)
- Haliclona (Gellius) friabilis (Lévi, 1956)
- Haliclona (Gellius) glaberrima (Topsent, 1897)
- Haliclona (Gellius) glacialis (Ridley & Dendy, 1886)
- Haliclona (Gellius) hispidula (Topsent, 1897)
- Haliclona (Gellius) holgerbrondstedi Van Soest & Hooper, 2020
- Haliclona (Gellius) intermedia (Brøndsted, 1924)
- Haliclona (Gellius) jeancharcoti Van Soest & Hooper, 2020
- Haliclona (Gellius) jorii (Uriz, 1984)
- Haliclona (Gellius) kieschnicki Van Soest & Hooper, 2020
- Haliclona (Gellius) lacazei (Topsent, 1893)
- Haliclona (Gellius) laevis (Ridley & Dendy, 1886)
- Haliclona (Gellius) latisigmae (Boury-Esnault & van Beveren, 1982)
- Haliclona (Gellius) laubenfelsi Van Soest & Hooper, 2020
- Haliclona (Gellius) laurentina (Lambe, 1900)
- Haliclona (Gellius) laxa (Topsent, 1892)
- Haliclona (Gellius) marismedi (Pulitzer-Finali, 1978)
- Haliclona (Gellius) megasclera Lehnert & van Soest, 1996
- Haliclona (Gellius) megastoma Burton, 1928
- Haliclona (Gellius) microsigma (Babic, 1922)
- Haliclona (Gellius) microtoxa (Lundbeck, 1902)
- Haliclona (Gellius) microxea (Li, 1986)
- Haliclona (Gellius) microxifera (Topsent, 1925)
- Haliclona (Gellius) panis (Lendenfeld, 1888)
- Haliclona (Gellius) patbergquistae Van Soest & Hooper, 2020
- Haliclona (Gellius) perforata (Wilson, 1904)
- Haliclona (Gellius) petrocalyx (Dendy, 1924)
- Haliclona (Gellius) phillipensis (Dendy, 1895)
- Haliclona (Gellius) primitiva (Lundbeck, 1902)
- Haliclona (Gellius) proxima (Lundbeck, 1902)
- Haliclona (Gellius) pulitzeri Van Soest & Hooper, 2020
- Haliclona (Gellius) raphidiophora (Lendenfeld, 1888)
- Haliclona (Gellius) rava (Stephens, 1912)
- Haliclona (Gellius) regia (Brøndsted, 1924)
- Haliclona (Gellius) reptans (Whitelegge, 1906)
- Haliclona (Gellius) rhaphidiophora (Brøndsted, 1933)
- Haliclona (Gellius) ridleyi (Hentschel, 1912)
- Haliclona (Gellius) rudis (Topsent, 1901)
- Haliclona (Gellius) spongiosa Topsent, 1904
- Haliclona (Gellius) strongylata (Lindgren, 1897)
- Haliclona (Gellius) tenerrima Burton, 1954
- Haliclona (Gellius) tenuisigma (Sarà & Siribelli, 1960)
- Haliclona (Gellius) textapatina (Laubenfels, 1926)
- Haliclona (Gellius) toxia (Topsent, 1897)
- Haliclona (Gellius) toxophora (Hentschel, 1912)
- Haliclona (Gellius) toxotes (Hentschel, 1912)
- Haliclona (Gellius) tremulus (Topsent, 1916)
- Haliclona (Gellius) tricurvatifera (Carter, 1876)
- Haliclona (Gellius) tubuloramosa (Dendy, 1924)
- Haliclona (Gellius) tylotoxa (Hentschel, 1914)
- Haliclona (Gellius) uncinata (Topsent, 1892)
- Haliclona (Gellius) varia (Bowerbank, 1875)
- Haliclona (Gellius) vasiformis (Wilson, 1925)
- Haliclona (Gellius) vladimirkoltuni Van Soest & Hooper, 2020

Subgenus Haliclona (Halichoclona) de Laubenfels, 1932

- Haliclona (Halichoclona) albifragilis (Hechtel, 1965)
- Haliclona (Halichoclona) caminata (Bergquist & Warne, 1980)
- Haliclona (Halichoclona) centrangulata (Sollas, 1902)
- Haliclona (Halichoclona) cioniformis (Lévi, 1956)
- Haliclona (Halichoclona) conica (Thiele, 1905)
- Haliclona (Halichoclona) depressa (Topsent, 1893)
- Haliclona (Halichoclona) dura Sandes, Bispo & Pinheiro, 2014
- Haliclona (Halichoclona) fistulosa (Bowerbank, 1866)
- Haliclona (Halichoclona) fortior (Schmidt, 1870)
- Haliclona (Halichoclona) fulva (Topsent, 1893)
- Haliclona (Halichoclona) gellindra (de Laubenfels, 1932)
- Haliclona (Halichoclona) latens (Topsent, 1892)
- Haliclona (Halichoclona) lernerae Campos, Mothes, Eckert & van Soest, 2005
- Haliclona (Halichoclona) magna (Vacelet, 1969)
- Haliclona (Halichoclona) magnifica de Weerdt, Rützler & Smith, 1991
- Haliclona (Halichoclona) mokuoloea (de Laubenfels, 1950)
- Haliclona (Halichoclona) parietalis (Topsent, 1893)
- Haliclona (Halichoclona) perlucida (Griessinger, 1971)
- Haliclona (Halichoclona) plakophila Vicente, Zea & Hill, 2016
- Haliclona (Halichoclona) pulitzerfinalii Van Soest & Hooper, 2020
- Haliclona (Halichoclona) sonnae Kelly & Rowden, 2019
- Haliclona (Halichoclona) stoneae de Weerdt, 2000
- Haliclona (Halichoclona) vanderlandi de Weerdt & van Soest, 2001
- Haliclona (Halichoclona) vansoesti de Weerdt, de Kluijver & Gómez, 1999

Subgenus Haliclona (Haliclona) Grant, 1836

- Haliclona (Haliclona) ambrosia (Dickinson, 1945)
- Haliclona (Haliclona) anonyma (Stephens, 1915)
- Haliclona (Haliclona) bifacialis Sarà, 1978
- Haliclona (Haliclona) cervicornis (Pallas, 1766)
- Haliclona (Haliclona) cribriformis (Ridley, 1884)
- Haliclona (Haliclona) cylindrica (Topsent, 1913)
- Haliclona (Haliclona) domingoi (Sarà, 1978)
- Haliclona (Haliclona) epiphytica Zea & de Weerdt, 1999
- Haliclona (Haliclona) fibrosa (Carter, 1887)
- Haliclona (Haliclona) gustavopulitzeri Van Soest & Hooper, 2020
- Haliclona (Haliclona) ieoensis Kim, Lee & Kang, 2017
- Haliclona (Haliclona) jeanmicheli Van Soest & Hooper, 2020
- Haliclona (Haliclona) mammillaris Mothes & Lerner, 1994
- Haliclona (Haliclona) massiliensis Van Soest & Hooper, 2020
- Haliclona (Haliclona) michelei Van Soest & Hooper, 2020
- Haliclona (Haliclona) nishimurai Tanita, 1977
- Haliclona (Haliclona) oculata (Linnaeus, 1759)
- Haliclona (Haliclona) onomichiensis Hoshino, 1981
- Haliclona (Haliclona) ramosamassa Hoshino, 1981
- Haliclona (Haliclona) simulans (Johnston, 1842)
- Haliclona (Haliclona) sonorensis Cruz-Barraza & Carballo, 2006
- Haliclona (Haliclona) sortitio Hoshino, 1981
- Haliclona (Haliclona) stilensis Burton, 1933
- Haliclona (Haliclona) sumenyoensis Kim, Lee & Kang, 2017
- Haliclona (Haliclona) tonggumiensis Kang, Lee & Sim, 2013
- Haliclona (Haliclona) uljinensis Kang & Sim, 2007
- Haliclona (Haliclona) urceolus (Rathke & Vahl, 1806)
- Haliclona (Haliclona) urizae Samaai & Gibbons, 2005
- Haliclona (Haliclona) varia (Sarà, 1958)
- Haliclona (Haliclona) venata (Sarà, 1960)
- Haliclona (Haliclona) violacea (Keller, 1883)
- Haliclona (Haliclona) violopurpura Hoshino, 1981

Subgenus Haliclona (Reniera) Schmidt, 1862

- Haliclona (Reniera) abbreviata (Topsent, 1918)
- Haliclona (Reniera) altera (Topsent, 1901)
- Haliclona (Reniera) alusiana (Lévi, 1969)
- Haliclona (Reniera) aquaeductus (Schmidt, 1862)
- Haliclona (Reniera) atra (Pulitzer-Finali, 1993)
- Haliclona (Reniera) caduca Hajdu, Desqueyroux-Faúndez, Carvalho, Lôbo-Hajdu & Willenz, 2013
- Haliclona (Reniera) chlorilla Bispo, Correia & Hajdu, 2016
- Haliclona (Reniera) cinerea (Grant, 1826)
- Haliclona (Reniera) ciocalyptoides Burton, 1933
- Haliclona (Reniera) citrina (Topsent, 1892)
- Haliclona (Reniera) clathrata (Dendy, 1895)
- Haliclona (Reniera) coerulescens (Topsent, 1918)
- Haliclona (Reniera) cratera (Schmidt, 1862)
- Haliclona (Reniera) cribricutis (Dendy, 1922)
- Haliclona (Reniera) debilis Pulitzer-Finali, 1993
- Haliclona (Reniera) delicata (Sarà, 1978)
- Haliclona (Reniera) fascigera (Hentschel, 1912)
- Haliclona (Reniera) griessingeri van Lent & De Weerdt, 1987
- Haliclona (Reniera) hongdoensis Kang & Sim, 2007
- Haliclona (Reniera) implexiformis (Hechtel, 1965)
- Haliclona (Reniera) infundibularis (Ridley & Dendy, 1887)
- Haliclona (Reniera) ligniformis (Dendy, 1922)
- Haliclona (Reniera) manglaris Alcolado, 1984
- Haliclona (Reniera) mediterranea Griessinger, 1971
- Haliclona (Reniera) mucifibrosa de Weerdt, Rützler & Smith, 1991
- Haliclona (Reniera) neens (Topsent, 1918)
- Haliclona (Reniera) negro (Tanita, 1965)
- Haliclona (Reniera) osiris (de Laubenfels, 1954)
- Haliclona (Reniera) phlox (de Laubenfels, 1954)
- Haliclona (Reniera) portroyalensis Jackson, de Weerdt & Webber, 2006
- Haliclona (Reniera) rotographura (Laubenfels, 1954)
- Haliclona (Reniera) ruetzleri de Weerdt, 2000
- Haliclona (Reniera) sinyeoensis Kang, Lee & Sim, 2013
- Haliclona (Reniera) strongylophora Lehnert & van Soest, 1996
- Haliclona (Reniera) subtilis Griessinger, 1971
- Haliclona (Reniera) tabernacula (Row, 1911)
- Haliclona (Reniera) topsenti (Thiele, 1905)
- Haliclona (Reniera) tubifera (George & Wilson, 1919)
- Haliclona (Reniera) tufoides (Dendy, 1922)
- Haliclona (Reniera) tyroeis (Laubenfels, 1954)
- Haliclona (Reniera) venusta (Bowerbank, 1875)

Subgenus Haliclona (Rhizoniera) Griessinger, 1971

- Haliclona (Rhizoniera) anceps (Thiele, 1905)
- Haliclona (Rhizoniera) australis (Lendenfeld, 1888)
- Haliclona (Rhizoniera) bouryesnaultae Van Soest & Hooper, 2020
- Haliclona (Rhizoniera) brondstedi Bergquist & Warne, 1980
- Haliclona (Rhizoniera) canaliculata Hartman, 1958
- Haliclona (Rhizoniera) curacaoensis (van Soest, 1980)
- Haliclona (Rhizoniera) dancoi (Topsent, 1901)
- Haliclona (Rhizoniera) enamela Laubenfels, 1930
- Haliclona (Rhizoniera) fugidia Muricy, Esteves, Monteiro, Rodrigues & Albano, 2015
- Haliclona (Rhizoniera) grossa (Schmidt, 1864)
- Haliclona (Rhizoniera) indistincta (Bowerbank, 1866)
- Haliclona (Rhizoniera) rhizophora (Vacelet, 1969)
- Haliclona (Rhizoniera) rosea (Bowerbank, 1866)
- Haliclona (Rhizoniera) rufescens (Lambe, 1893)
- Haliclona (Rhizoniera) sarai (Pulitzer-Finali, 1969)
- Haliclona (Rhizoniera) strongylata (Lévi & Lévi, 1983)
- Haliclona (Rhizoniera) tromsoica (Hentschel, 1929)
- Haliclona (Rhizoniera) viscosa (Topsent, 1888)

Subgenus Haliclona (Soestella) De Weerdt, 2000

- Haliclona (Soestella) arenata (Griessinger, 1971)
- Haliclona (Soestella) auletta (Thiele, 1905)
- Haliclona (Soestella) battershilli Kelly & Rowden, 2019
- Haliclona (Soestella) brassica Sandes, Bispo & Pinheiro, 2014
- Haliclona (Soestella) caerulea (Hechtel, 1965)
- Haliclona (Soestella) chilensis (Thiele, 1905)
- Haliclona (Soestella) crowtheri Goodwin, Brewin & Brickle, 2012
- Haliclona (Soestella) elegantia (Bowerbank, 1875)
- Haliclona (Soestella) fimbriata Bertolino & Pansini, 2015
- Haliclona (Soestella) implexa (Schmidt, 1868)
- Haliclona (Soestella) lehnerti de Weerdt, 2000
- Haliclona (Soestella) luciensis de Weerdt, 2000
- Haliclona (Soestella) mamillata (Griessinger, 1971)
- Haliclona (Soestella) melana Muricy & Ribeiro, 1999
- Haliclona (Soestella) mucosa (Griessinger, 1971)
- Haliclona (Soestella) peixinhoae Bispo, Correia & Hajdu, 2016
- Haliclona (Soestella) piscaderaensis (van Soest, 1980)
- Haliclona (Soestella) smithae de Weerdt, 2000
- Haliclona (Soestella) twincayensis de Weerdt, Rützler & Smith, 1991
- Haliclona (Soestella) valliculata (Griessinger, 1971)
- Haliclona (Soestella) vermeuleni de Weerdt, 2000
- Haliclona (Soestella) walentinae Díaz, Thacker, Rützler & Piantoni, 2007
- Haliclona (Soestella) xena De Weerdt, 1986

Subgenus unassigned

- Haliclona acoroides Kelly-Borges & Bergquist, 1988
- Haliclona agglutinata Desqueyroux-Faúndez, 1990
- Haliclona alba (Schmidt, 1862)
- Haliclona algicola (Thiele, 1905)
- Haliclona amphioxa (de Laubenfels, 1950)
- Haliclona aperta (Sarà, 1960)
- Haliclona arctica (Fristedt, 1887)
- Haliclona arenosa (Carter, 1882)
- Haliclona baeri (Wilson, 1925)
- Haliclona bawiana (Lendenfeld, 1897)
- Haliclona bergquistae Van Soest & Hooper, 2020
- Haliclona bilamellata Burton, 1932
- Haliclona boutschinskii (Kudelin, 1910)
- Haliclona bucina Tanita & Hoshino, 1989
- Haliclona bulbifera (Swartschewsky, 1906)
- Haliclona calamus (Lundbeck, 1902)
- Haliclona cancellata (Carter, 1887)
- Haliclona carteri Burton, 1959
- Haliclona catarinensis Mothes & Lerner, 1994
- Haliclona cavernosa (Pulitzer-Finali, 1993)
- Haliclona cerebrum (Burton, 1928)
- Haliclona clara Cuartas, 1992
- Haliclona cnidata Schellenberg, Reichert, Hardt, Schmidtberg, Kämpfer, Glasser, Schubert & Wilke, 2019
- Haliclona columbae (Walker, 1808)
- Haliclona corticata (Lendenfeld, 1887)
- Haliclona cribrata (Pulitzer-Finali, 1983)
- Haliclona cribrosa (Czerniavsky, 1880)
- Haliclona curiosa (Swartschewsky, 1905)
- Haliclona cylindrigera (Czerniavsky, 1880)
- Haliclona daepoensis (Sim & Lee, 1997)
- Haliclona decidua (Topsent, 1906)
- Haliclona delicatula (Ali, 1956)
- Haliclona dendrilla (Lendenfeld, 1887)
- Haliclona densa (Lendenfeld, 1887)
- Haliclona densaspicula Hoshino, 1981
- Haliclona digitata (Lendenfeld, 1887)
- Haliclona divulgata Koltun, 1964
- Haliclona djeedara Fromont & Abdo, 2014
- Haliclona durdong Fromont & Abdo, 2014
- Haliclona elegans (Lendenfeld, 1887)
- Haliclona ellipsis Hoshino, 1981
- Haliclona enormismacula Hoshino, 1981
- Haliclona ernsthentscheli Van Soest & Hooper, 2020
- Haliclona ernsti Van Soest & Hooper, 2020
- Haliclona eterospiculata (Sarà, 1978)
- Haliclona fibulifera (Carter, 1880)
- Haliclona filholi (Topsent, 1890)
- Haliclona firma (Swartschewsky, 1906)
- Haliclona flabellodigitata Burton, 1934
- Haliclona flaccida (Topsent, 1908)
- Haliclona flava (Nardo, 1847)
- Haliclona flavescens (Topsent, 1893)
- Haliclona foliacea (Miklucho-Maclay, 1870)
- Haliclona folium (Schmidt, 1870)
- Haliclona foraminosa (Czerniavsky, 1880)
- Haliclona forcellata (Nardo, 1847)
- Haliclona fragilis (Vacelet, Vasseur & Lévi, 1976)
- Haliclona frondosa Hoshino, 1981
- Haliclona fryetti (Dendy, 1895)
- Haliclona gemina Sarà, 1978
- Haliclona glabra Bergquist, 1961
- Haliclona globosa (Lendenfeld, 1887)
- Haliclona gracilis (Miklucho-Maclay, 1870)
- Haliclona groenlandica (Fristedt, 1887)
- Haliclona hebes (Schmidt, 1870)
- Haliclona henrycarteri Van Soest & Hooper, 2020
- Haliclona hirsuta (Swartschewsky, 1906)
- Haliclona hornelli (Dendy, 1916)
- Haliclona hoshinoi Ise, 2017
- Haliclona hoshinoi Van Soest & Hooper, 2020
- Haliclona hydroida Tanita & Hoshino, 1989
- Haliclona ignobilis (Thiele, 1905)
- Haliclona inepta (Thiele, 1905)
- Haliclona inflata (Schmidt, 1868)
- Haliclona informis (Schmidt, 1868)
- Haliclona infundibuliformis (Miklucho-Maclay, 1870)
- Haliclona innominata (Kirkpatrick, 1900)
- Haliclona irregularis (Czerniavsky, 1880)
- Haliclona isodictyalis Bergquist, 1961
- Haliclona kaikoura Bergquist & Warne, 1980
- Haliclona kirkpatricki Van Soest & Hooper, 2020
- Haliclona korema de Laubenfels, 1954
- Haliclona koremella de Laubenfels, 1954
- Haliclona labyrinthica sensu Burton, 1956
- Haliclona lendenfeldi Van Soest & Hooper, 2020
- Haliclona lentus Hoshino, 1981
- Haliclona leopoldbaeri Van Soest & Hooper, 2020
- Haliclona leopoldi Van Soest & Hooper, 2020
- Haliclona levii Van Soest & Hooper, 2020
- Haliclona liber (Hoshino, 1981)
- Haliclona lilaceus Mothes & Lerner, 1994
- Haliclona lobosa (Lendenfeld, 1888)
- Haliclona lutea (Lendenfeld, 1887)
- Haliclona macropora (Thiele, 1905)
- Haliclona macrorhaphis (Lendenfeld, 1887)
- Haliclona madagascarensis Vacelet, Vasseur & Lévi, 1976
- Haliclona madrepora (Dendy, 1889)
- Haliclona maxima Bergquist & Warne, 1980
- Haliclona merejkowskii (Swartschewsky, 1906)
- Haliclona minima (Lendenfeld, 1887)
- Haliclona mollicula (Lundbeck, 1902)
- Haliclona mollis (Lambe, 1893)
- Haliclona mollis (Schmidt, 1870)
- Haliclona muricata (Ridley, 1884)
- Haliclona nigra (Burton, 1929)
- Haliclona nigricans (Czerniavsky, 1880)
- Haliclona nitens Desqueyroux-Faúndez, 1990
- Haliclona nodosa (Thiele, 1905)
- Haliclona odessana (Kudelin, 1910)
- Haliclona offerospicula Hoshino, 1981
- Haliclona olivacea Fromont, 1995
- Haliclona omissa (Griessinger, 1971)
- Haliclona pacifica Hooper in Hooper & Wiedenmayer, 1994
- Haliclona palmata (sensu Lieberkühn, 1859)
- Haliclona palmonensis Carballo & Garcia-Gómez, 1995
- Haliclona papillifera (Swartschewsky, 1906)
- Haliclona parietalioides (Bergquist, 1961)
- Haliclona pedicelata (Cuartas, 1986)
- Haliclona pedunculata (Ridley & Dendy, 1886)
- Haliclona penicillata (Topsent, 1908)
- Haliclona permollisimilis Hoshino, 1981
- Haliclona petrosioides Burton, 1932
- Haliclona pigmentifera (Dendy, 1905)
- Haliclona pocilliformis (Griessinger, 1971)
- Haliclona poecillastroides (Vacelet, 1969)
- Haliclona polychotoma (Carter, 1885)
- Haliclona polypoides (Vacelet, Vasseur & Lévi, 1976)
- Haliclona pons (Schmidt, 1870)
- Haliclona pontica (Czerniavsky, 1880)
- Haliclona proletaria (Topsent, 1908)
- Haliclona pulcherrima (Brøndsted, 1924)
- Haliclona pulchra (Swartschewsky, 1906)
- Haliclona pulvinar (Topsent, 1897)
- Haliclona punctata Bergquist & Warne, 1980
- Haliclona ramosa (Lendenfeld, 1887)
- Haliclona ramusculoides (Topsent, 1893)
- Haliclona rapanui (Desqueyroux-Faúndez, 1990)
- Haliclona rectangularis (Ridley & Dendy, 1886)
- Haliclona reticulata (Lendenfeld, 1887)
- Haliclona reversa (Kirk, 1911)
- Haliclona robustaspicula Hoshino, 1981
- Haliclona rossica (Hentschel, 1929)
- Haliclona rowi Van Soest & Hooper, 2020
- Haliclona rubra (Lendenfeld, 1887)
- Haliclona rugosa (Thiele, 1905)
- Haliclona sabulosa Bergquist & Warne, 1980
- Haliclona saldanhae (Stephens, 1915)
- Haliclona sanguinea Fromont, 1995
- Haliclona sasajimensis Hoshino, 1981
- Haliclona sataensis Hoshino, 1981
- Haliclona scabritia Tanita & Hoshino, 1989
- Haliclona schmidtii (Czerniavsky, 1880)
- Haliclona scotti (Kirkpatrick, 1907)
- Haliclona scyphonoides (sensu Ridley, 1884)
- Haliclona semifibrosa (Dendy, 1916)
- Haliclona shimoebuensis (Hoshino, 1981)
- Haliclona similis (Topsent, 1897)
- Haliclona simplex (Czerniavsky, 1880)
- Haliclona simplicissima (Burton, 1933)
- Haliclona siphonella (Thiele, 1905)
- Haliclona solowetzkaja (Hentschel, 1929)
- Haliclona sordida (Thiele, 1905)
- Haliclona sorongae (Brøndsted, 1934)
- Haliclona spiculotenuis (Topsent, 1891)
- Haliclona spinosella (Thiele, 1905)
- Haliclona spitzbergensis (Hentschel, 1916)
- Haliclona spongiosissima (Topsent, 1908)
- Haliclona stelliderma Bergquist & Warne, 1980
- Haliclona stephensi Burton, 1932
- Haliclona steueri Burton, 1936
- Haliclona stirpescens (Topsent, 1925)
- Haliclona streble de Laubenfels, 1954
- Haliclona striata Vacelet, Vasseur & Lévi, 1976
- Haliclona subglobosa (Ridley & Dendy, 1886)
- Haliclona submonilifera Uriz, 1988
- Haliclona surrufa Hoshino, 1981
- Haliclona swartschewskiji (Hentschel, 1929)
- Haliclona tachibanaensis Hoshino, 1981
- Haliclona takaharui Van Soest & Hooper, 2020
- Haliclona tanitai Van Soest & Hooper, 2020
- Haliclona teligera (Topsent, 1889)
- Haliclona tenacior Bergquist, 1961
- Haliclona tenella (Lendenfeld, 1887)
- Haliclona tenera (Marenzeller, 1878)
- Haliclona tenuiderma (Lundbeck, 1902)
- Haliclona tenuiramosa (Burton, 1930)
- Haliclona tenuis Hoshino, 1981
- Haliclona tenuispiculata Burton, 1934
- Haliclona texta Sarà, 1978
- Haliclona thielei Van Soest & Hooper, 2020
- Haliclona transitans (Czerniavsky, 1880)
- Haliclona translucida Desqueyroux-Faúndez, 1990
- Haliclona tubulifera (Swartschewsky, 1905)
- Haliclona tubulosa (Miklucho-Maclay, 1870)
- Haliclona tulearensis Vacelet, Vasseur & Lévi, 1976
- Haliclona turquoisia (de Laubenfels, 1954)
- Haliclona tyria Fromont, 1995
- Haliclona ulreungia Sim & Byeon, 1989
- Haliclona utriculus (Topsent, 1904)
- Haliclona uwaensis (Hoshino, 1981)
- Haliclona varia sensu Lundbeck, 1909
- Haliclona vega (Fristedt, 1887)
- Haliclona venustina (Bergquist, 1961)
- Haliclona verrucosa (Thiele, 1905)
- Haliclona villosa (Lendenfeld, 1887)
- Haliclona viola (de Laubenfels, 1954)
- Haliclona virens (Topsent, 1908)
- Haliclona virgata (Bowerbank, 1875)
- Haliclona voeringi (Lundbeck, 1902)
- Haliclona willundbecki Van Soest & Hooper, 2020
