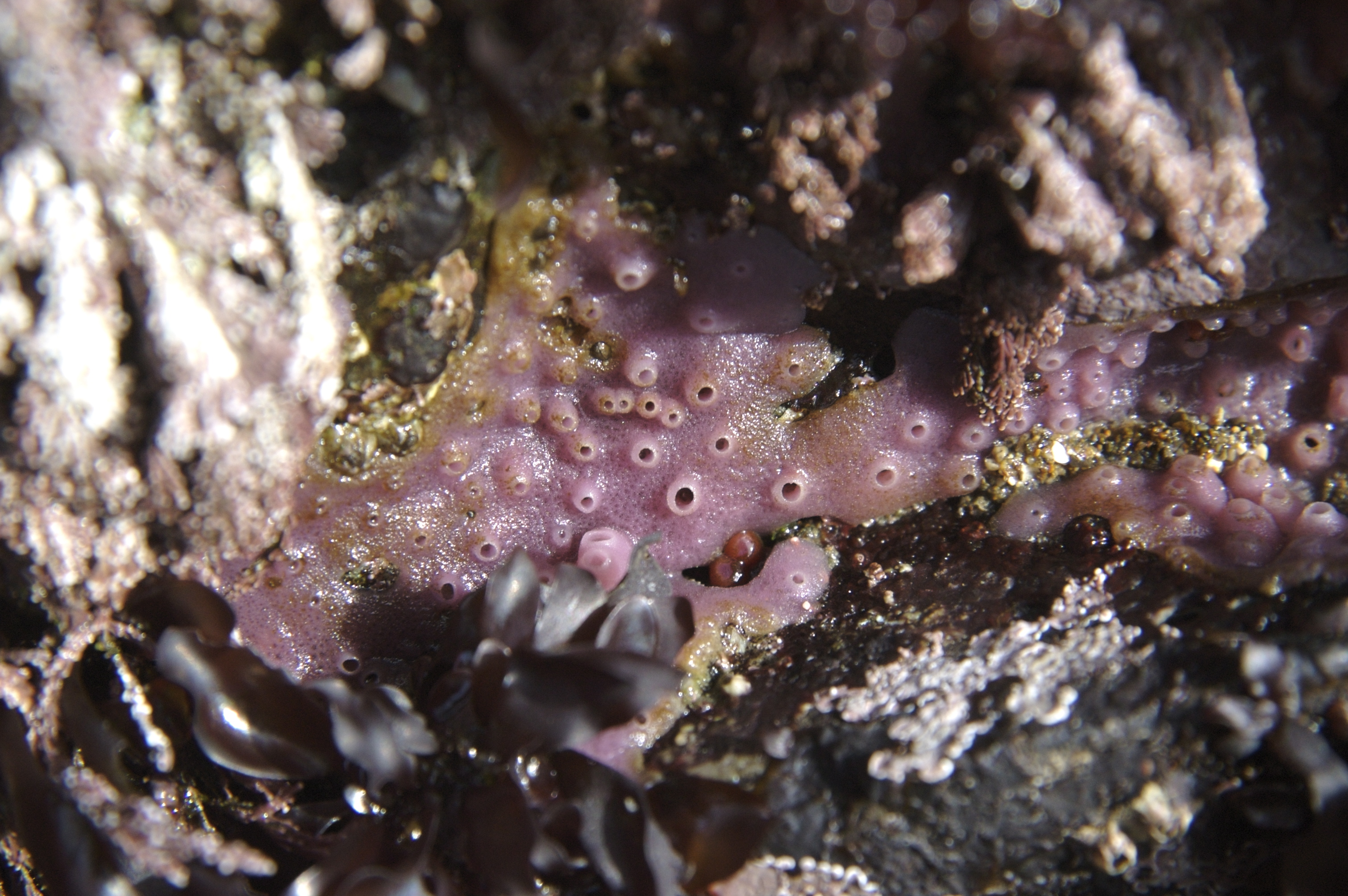
- Haliclona permollis

Scientific classification
- Kingdom: Animalia
- Phylum: Porifera
- Class: Demospongiae
- Order: Haplosclerida
- Family: Chalinidae; Gray, 1867

Genera
- See text

Synonyms
- List: Adociidae Laubenfels, 1936; Gelliadae Gray, 1872; Gelliidae Gray, 1872; Gelliinae Gray, 1872; Haliclonidae de Laubenfels, 1932; Renieridae Schmidt, 1870; Renierinae Schmidt, 1870

= Chalinidae =

Family of sponges

Chalinidae is a family of marine demosponges, containing the following genera:

- Chalinula Schmidt, 1868
- Cladocroce Topsent, 1892
- Dendrectilla Pulitzer-Finali, 1983
- Dendroxea Griessinger, 1971
- Haliclona Grant, 1836

== Predators ==
An unidentified species from the family Chalinidae is a prey of the sea slug Tyrinna evelinae in Brazil.
