= List of restriction enzyme cutting sites: S =

Legend of nucleobases
Code	Nucleotide represented
A	Adenine (A)
C	Cytosine (C)
G	Guanine (G)
T	Thymine (T)
N	A, C, G or T
M	A or C
R	A or G
W	A or T
Y	C or T
S	C or G
K	G or T
H	A, C or T
B	C, G or T
V	A, C or G
D	A, G or T

This article contains a list of the most studied restriction enzymes whose names start with S. It contains approximately 130 enzymes. The following information is given:

- Enzyme: Accepted name of the molecule, according to the internationally adopted nomenclature, and bibliographical references. (Further reading: see the section "Nomenclature" in the article "Restriction enzyme".)
- PDB code: Code used to identify the structure of a protein in the PDB database of protein structures. The 3D atomic structure of a protein provides highly valuable information to understand the intimate details of its mechanism of action.
- Source: Organism that naturally produces the enzyme.
- Recognition sequence: Sequence of DNA recognized by the enzyme and to which it specifically binds.
- Cut: Cutting site and DNA products of the cut. The recognition sequence and the cutting site usually match, but sometimes the cutting site can be dozens of nucleotides away from the recognition site.
- Isoschizomers and neoschizomers: An isoschizomer is an enzyme that recognizes the same sequence as another. A neoschizomer is a special type of isoschizomer that recognizes the same sequence as another, but cuts in a different manner. A maximum number of 8-10 most common isoschizomers are indicated for every enzyme but there may be many more. Neoschizomers are shown in bold and green color font (e.g.: **BamHI**). When "None on date" is indicated, that means that there were no registered isoschizomers in the databases on that date with a clearly defined cutting site. Isoschizomers indicated in white font and grey background correspond to enzymes not listed in the current lists:

as in this not listed enzyme:	EcoR70I

== Restriction enzymes ==
=== S ===
**Enzyme**	**PDB code**	Source	**Recognition sequence**	**Cut**	**Isoschizomers**
SacI		Streptomyces achromogenes	5' GAGCTC; 3' CTCGAG	5' ---GAGCT C--- 3'; 3' ---C TCGAG--- 5'
SacII		Streptomyces achromogenes	5' CCGCGG; 3' GGCGCC	5' ---CCGC GG--- 3'; 3' ---GG CGCC--- 5'	Cfr42I
SacNI		Streptomyces achromogenes N-J-H	5' GRGCYC; 3' CYCGRG	5' ---GRGCY C--- 3'; 3' ---C YCGRG--- 5'
SalI		Streptomyces albus	5' GTCGAC; 3' CAGCTG	5' ---G TCGAC--- 3'; 3' ---CAGCT G--- 5'
SalPI		Streptomyces albus	5' CTGCAG; 3' GACGTC	5' ---CTGCA G--- 3'; 3' ---G ACGTC--- 5'	ApiI, BspMAI, CstI, Ecl37kI, Ecl2zI, Psp23I, PstI, Srl5DI, YenI
SanDI		Streptomyces sp.	5' GGGWCCC; 3' CCCWGGG	5' ---GG GWCCC--- 3'; 3' ---CCCWG GG--- 5'
SapI		Saccharopolyspora sp.	5' GCTCTTC; 3' CGAGAAG	5' ---GCTCTTCN NNN--- 3'; 3' ---CGAGAAGNNNN --- 5'
SarI		Streptomyces aureomonopodiales	5' AGGCCT; 3' TCCGGA	5' ---AGG CCT--- 3'; 3' ---TCC GGA--- 5'	AatI, AspMI, Eco147I, GdiI, PceI, Pme55I, Sru30DI, SseBI, SteI, StuI
SatI		Staphylococcus arlettae RFL832	5' GCNGC; 3' CGNCG	5' ---GC NGC--- 3'; 3' ---CGN CG--- 5'
SauI		Streptomyces aureofaciens IKA 18/4	5' CCTNAGG; 3' GGANTCC	5' ---CC TNAGG--- 3'; 3' ---GGANT CC--- 5'	AocI, BliHKI, BspR7I, CvnI, Lmu60I, OxaNI, SauI, SshAI
Sau96I		Staphylococcus aureus PS96	5' GGNCC; 3' CCNGG	5' ---G GNCC--- 3'; 3' ---CCNG G--- 5'	AsuI, Bal228I, Bce22I, BsiZI, BspF4I, Cfr13I, Nsp7121I, **UnbI**
Sau3239I		Streptomyces aureofaciens	5' CTCGAG; 3' GAGCTC	5' ---C TCGAG--- 3'; 3' ---GAGCT C--- 5'	BspAAI, BstVI, MlaAI, PaeR7I, Sbi68I, Sfr274I, SlaI, XpaI
Sau3AI	2REU	Staphylococcus aureus 3A	5' GATC; 3' CTAG	5' --- GATC--- 3'; 3' ---CTAG --- 5'	Bce243I, Bsp143I, BspJI, BstMBI, CviAI, Kzo9I, NdeII, Sth368I
SauBMKI		Streptomyces aureofaciens BM-K	5' GCCGGC; 3' CGGCCG	5' ---GCC GGC--- 3'; 3' ---CGG CCG--- 5'
SauHPI		Streptomyces aureofaciens R8/26	5' GCCGGC; 3' CGGCCG	5' ---GCC GGC--- 3'; 3' ---CGG CCG--- 5'
SauLPI		Streptomyces aureofaciens B-96	5' GCCGGC; 3' CGGCCG	5' ---GCC GGC--- 3'; 3' ---CGG CCG--- 5'
SauLPII		Streptomyces aureofaciens B-96	5' CTCGAG; 3' GAGCTC	5' ---C TCGAG--- 3'; 3' ---GAGCT C--- 5'	BspAAI, MavI, MlaAI, PaeR7I, Sbi68I, Sfr274I, SlaI, XpaI
SauMI		Staphylococcus aureus M	5' GATC; 3' CTAG	5' --- GATC--- 3'; 3' ---CTAG --- 5'	BscFI, BspAI, **BstKTI**, **ChaI**, HacI, MkrAI, RalF40I, SsiAI
SauNI		Streptomyces aureofaciens NMU	5' GCCGGC; 3' CGGCCG	5' ---GCC GGC--- 3'; 3' ---CGG CCG--- 5'
SauSI		Streptomyces aureofaciens 16	5' GCCGGC; 3' CGGCCG	5' ---GCC GGC--- 3'; 3' ---CGG CCG--- 5'
SbfI		Streptomyces sp. BF-61	5' CCTGCAGG; 3' GGACGTCC	5' ---CCTGCA GG--- 3'; 3' ---GG ACGTCC--- 5'
Sbi68I		Streptomyces bikiniensis JAM68	5' CTCGAG; 3' GAGCTC	5' ---C TCGAG--- 3'; 3' ---GAGCT C--- 5'	BspAAI, MavI, MlaAI, PaeR7I, Sbi68I, Sol10179I, StrI, XpaI
Sbo13I		Shigella boydii 13	5' TCGCGA; 3' AGCGCT	5' ---TCG CGA--- 3'; 3' ---AGC GCT--- 5'
SbvI		Streptococcus bovis II/1	5' GGCC; 3' CCGG	5' ---GG CC--- 3'; 3' ---CC GG--- 5'
ScaI		Streptomyces caespitosus	5' AGTACT; 3' TCATGA	5' ---AGT ACT--- 3'; 3' ---TCA TGA--- 5'	Acc113I, AssI, / BmcAI, Bpa34I, DpaI, Eco255I, RflFII, ZrmI
SceIII		Saccharomyces cerevisiae	5' GCCGGC; 3' CGGCCG	5' ---G CCGGC--- 3'; 3' ---CGGCC G--- 5'
SchI		Staphylococcus cohnii Lki 19-320	5' GAGTC; 3' CTCAG	5' ---GAGTCN_{4}N --- 3'; 3' ---CTCAGN_{4}N --- 5'
SchZI		Streptomyces chusanensis ZS-2	5' CCGCGG; 3' GGCGCC	5' ---CCGC GG--- 3'; 3' ---GG CGCC--- 5'
SciI		Streptoverticillium cinnamoneum	5' CTCGAG; 3' GAGCTC	5' ---CTC GAG--- 3'; 3' ---GAG CTC--- 5'	**BspAAI**, **BstVI**, **MlaAI**, **PaeR7I**, **SauLPII**, **SlaI**, **Sol10179I**, **XhoI**
SciNI		Spiroplasma citri ASP2	5' GCGC; 3' CGCG	5' ---G CGC--- 3'; 3' ---CGC G--- 5'	**BspLAI**, **BstHHI**, **CfoI**, **FnuDIII**, **HhaI**, Hin6I, HinP1I, HsoI, HspAI
ScrFI		Streptococcus cremoris F	5' CCNGG; 3' GGNCC	5' ---CC NGG--- 3'; 3' ---GGN CC--- 5'
SdaI	2IXS	Streptomyces diastaticus Ng7-324	5' CCTGCAGG; 3' GGACGTCC	5' ---CCTGCA GG--- 3'; 3' ---GG ACGTCC--- 5'
SdiI		Streptomyces diastaticus	5' GGCCN_{5}GGCC; 3' CCGGN_{5}CCGG	5' ---GGCCNNNN NGGCC--- 3'; 3' ---CCGGN NNNNCCGG--- 5'
SduI		Streptococcus durans RFL3	5' GDGCHC; 3' CHCGDG	5' ---GDGCH C--- 3'; 3' ---C HCGDG--- 5'	AocII, BmyI, BsoCI, Bsp1286I, BspLS2I, MhlI, NspII
SecI		Synechocystis sp. 6701	5' CCNNGG; 3' GGNNCC	5' ---C CNNGG--- 3'; 3' ---GGNNC C--- 5'
SelI		Synechococcus elongatus	5' CGCG; 3' GCGC	5' --- CGCG--- 3'; 3' ---GCGC --- 5'	**AccII**, **Bsh1236I**, **Bsp123I**, **Bsp50I**, **BstFNI**, **BstUI**, **BtkI**, **Csp68KVI**
SenPT16I		Salmonella enteritidis PT16	5' CGGCCG; 3' GCCGGC	5' ---C GGCCG--- 3'; 3' ---GCCGG C--- 5'	AaaI, BseX3I, BstZI, EagI, EclXI, Eco52I, XmaIII
SenPT14bI		Salmonella enteritidis PT14b	5' CCGCGG; 3' GGCGCC	5' ---CCGC GG--- 3'; 3' ---GG CGCC--- 5'
SepI		Staphylococcus epidermidis	5' ATGCAT; 3' TACGTA	5' ---ATGCA T--- 3'; 3' ---T ACGTA--- 5'	BfrBI, Csp68KIII, Mph1103I, NsiI, PinBI, Ppu10I, SspD5II, Zsp2I
SexAI		Streptomyces exfoliatus	5' ACCWGGT; 3' TGGWCCA	5' ---A CCWGGT--- 3'; 3' ---TGGWCC A--- 5'
SexBI		Streptomyces exfoliatus	5' CCGCGG; 3' GGCGCC	5' ---CCGC GG--- 3'; 3' ---GG CGCC--- 5'
SexCI		Streptomyces exfoliatus	5' CCGCGG; 3' GGCGCC	5' ---CCGC GG--- 3'; 3' ---GG CGCC--- 5'
SfaI		Streptococcus faecalis zymogenes	5' GGCC; 3' CCGG	5' ---GG CC--- 3'; 3' ---CC GG--- 5'
SfaNI		Streptococcus faecalis ND547	5' GCATC; 3' CGTAG	5' ---GCATCN_{4}N NNNN--- 3'; 3' ---CGTAGN_{4}NNNNN --- 5'
SfcI		Streptococcus faecium	5' CTRYAG; 3' GAYRTC	5' ---C TRYAG--- 3'; 3' ---GAYRT C--- 5'
SfeI		Streptococcus faecalis	5' CTRYAG; 3' GAYRTC	5' ---C TRYAG--- 3'; 3' ---GAYRT C--- 5'
SfiI	2F03	Streptomyces fimbriatus	5' GGCCN_{5}GGCC; 3' CCGGN_{5}CCGG	5' ---GGCCNNNN NGGCC--- 3'; 3' ---CCGGN NNNNCCGG--- 5'
SflI		Streptoverticillium flavopersicum	5' CTGCAG; 3' GACGTC	5' ---CTGCA G--- 3'; 3' ---G ACGTC--- 5'	ApiI, BspMAI, BsuBI, CfrA4I, Psp23I, PstI, Sag23I, Srl5DI, YenI
SfoI		Serratia fonticola	5' GGCGCC; 3' CCGCGG	5' ---GGC GCC--- 3'; 3' ---CCG CGG--- 5'
Sfr274I		Streptomyces fradiae 274	5' CTCGAG; 3' GAGCTC	5' ---C TCGAG--- 3'; 3' ---GAGCT C--- 5'	AbrI, BluI, BssHI, MavI, Sau3239I, Sol10179I, StrI, TliI
Sfr303I		Streptomyces fradiae 303	5' CCGCGG; 3' GGCGCC	5' ---CCGC GG--- 3'; 3' ---GG CGCC--- 5'
SfuI		Streptomyces fulvissimus	5' TTCGAA; 3' AAGCTT	5' ---TT CGAA--- 3'; 3' ---AAGC TT--- 5'	AsuII, BimI, Bsp119I, CbiI, Csp68KII, PlaII, Ssp1I, SviI
SgfI		Streptomyces griseoruber	5' GCGATCGC; 3' CGCTAGCG	5' ---GCGAT CGC--- 3'; 3' ---CGC TAGCG--- 5'	AsiSI, / RgaI, SfaAI
SgrAI	3DPG 3N7B 3N78 3MGY 3MG6	Streptomyces griseus	5' CRCCGGYG; 3' GYGGCCRC	5' ---CR CCGGYG--- 3'; 3' ---GYGGCC RC--- 5'
SgrBI		Streptomyces griseus	5' CCGCGG; 3' GGCGCC	5' ---CCGC GG--- 3'; 3' ---GG CGCC--- 5'
SimI		Staphylococcus intermedius 6H	5' GGGTC; 3' CCCAG	5' ---GG GTC--- 3'; 3' ---CCCAG --- 5'
SinI		Salmonella infantis	5' GGWCC; 3' CCWGG	5' ---G GWCC--- 3'; 3' ---CCWG G--- 5'	Bme216I, CauI, EagMI, FdiI, HgiBI, HgiHIII, **Psp03I**, VpaK11BI
SlaI		Streptomyces lavendulae	5' CTCGAG; 3' GAGCTC	5' ---C TCGAG--- 3'; 3' ---GAGCT C--- 5'	AbrI, BluI, BssHI, MavI, Sau3239I, Sfr274I, TliI, XhoI
SleI		Synechococcus leopoliensis	5' CCWGG; 3' GGWCC	5' --- CCWGG--- 3'; 3' ---GGWCC --- 5'	**AeuI**, **AglI**, **ApaORI**, **BspNI**, **Bst2I**, EcoRII, **SniI**, **SslI**, SspAI, **ZanI**
Slu1777I		Streptomyces lusitanus 1777	5' GCCGGC; 3' CGGCCG	5' ---GCC GGC--- 3'; 3' ---CGG CCG--- 5'
SmaI		Serratia marcescens Sb	5' CCCGGG; 3' GGGCCC	5' ---CCC GGG--- 3'; 3' ---GGG CCC--- 5'	AhyI, **CfrJ4I**, EaeAI, EclRI, Pac25I, PspAI, TspMI, XcyI, XmaI, XmaCI
SmiI		Streptococcus milleri S	5' ATTTAAAT; 3' TAAATTTA	5' ---ATTT AAAT--- 3'; 3' ---TAAA TTTA--- 5'
SmiMI		Sphingobacterium mizutae M	5' CAYN_{4}RTG; 3' GTRN_{4}YAC	5' ---CAYNN NNRTG--- 3'; 3' ---GTRNN NNYAC--- 5'
SmlI		Stenotrophomonas maltophilia	5' CTYRAG; 3' GARYTC	5' ---C TYRAG--- 3'; 3' ---GARYT C--- 5'
SmuI		Sphingobacterium multivorum RFL21	5' CCCGC; 3' GGGCG	5' ---CCCGCNNNN NN--- 3'; 3' ---GGGCGNNNNNN --- 5'
SmuEI		Streptococcus mutans E	5' GGWCC; 3' CCWGG	5' ---G GWCC--- 3'; 3' ---CCWG G--- 5'	Bme216I, CauI, EagMI, FdiI, HgiBI, HgiHIII, **Psp03I**, VpaK11BI
SnaBI		Sphaerotilus natans	5' TACGTA; 3' ATGCAT	5' ---TAC GTA--- 3'; 3' ---ATG CAT--- 5'
SniI		Streptomyces niveus	5' CCWGG; 3' GGWCC	5' ---CC WGG--- 3'; 3' ---GGW CC--- 5'	ApaORI, BseBI, BshGI, BstNI, BstOI, Bst2UI, BthEI, MvaI, **SspAI**
SnoI		Streptomyces novocastria	5' GTGCAC; 3' CACGTG	5' ---G TGCAC--- 3'; 3' ---CACGT G--- 5'	Alw44I, ApaLI, VneI
SolI		Streptoverticillium olivoverticillatum	5' GGATCC; 3' CCTAGG	5' ---G GATCC--- 3'; 3' ---CCTAG G--- 5'	AccEBI, AliI, ApaCI, BamHI, Bce751I, CelI, OkrAI, SolI, SurI
Sol10179I		Streptomyces olivochromogenes ST10179	5' CTCGAG; 3' GAGCTC	5' ---C TCGAG--- 3'; 3' ---GAGCT C--- 5'	BspAAI, MavI, MlaAI, PaeR7I, Sbi68I, Sol10179I, StrI, XpaI
SpaHI		Synechococus parietina	5' GCATGC; 3' CGTACG	5' ---GCATG C--- 3'; 3' ---C GTACG--- 5'
SpeI		Sphaerotilus natans	5' ACTAGT; 3' TGATCA	5' ---A CTAGT--- 3'; 3' ---TGATC A--- 5'	AhII, AclNI, BcuI
SphI		Streptomyces phaeochromogenes	5' GCATGC; 3' CGTACG	5' ---GCATG C--- 3'; 3' ---C GTACG--- 5'
SplI		Spirulina platensis	5' CGTACG; 3' GCATGC	5' ---C GTACG--- 3'; 3' ---GCATG C--- 5'
SpmI		Sphingobacterium multivorum RFL21	5' ATCGAT; 3' TAGCTA	5' ---AT CGAT--- 3'; 3' ---TAGC TA--- 5'	BanIII, BbvAII, BdiI, BscI, Bsa29I, BspJI, ClaI, LcaI, PgaI, Ssp27144I
SpoI		Salmonella potsdam	5' TCGCGA; 3' AGCGCT	5' ---TCG CGA--- 3'; 3' ---AGC GCT--- 5'
SpuI		Streptomyces pulveraceus	5' CCGCGG; 3' GGCGCC	5' ---CCGC GG--- 3'; 3' ---GG CGCC--- 5'
SrfI		Streptomyces sp.	5' GCCCGGGC; 3' CGGGCCCG	5' ---GCCC GGGC--- 3'; 3' ---CGGG CCCG--- 5'
SrlI		Selenomonas ruminantium lactilytica 84	5' GCCGGC; 3' CGGCCG	5' ---G CCGGC--- 3'; 3' ---CGGCC G--- 5'
Srl5DI		Selenomonas ruminantium 5	5' CTGCAG; 3' GACGTC	5' ---CTGCA G--- 3'; 3' ---G ACGTC--- 5'	AliAJI, Asp713I, BspMAI, BsuBI, CfrA4I, Pfl21I, PstI, SflI, Srl5DI
Srl32DII		Selenomonas ruminantium 32	5' GAATTC; 3' CTTAAG	5' ---G AATTC--- 3'; 3' ---CTTAA G--- 5'
Srl55DI		Selenomonas ruminantium lactilytica 55	5' GAATTC; 3' CTTAAG	5' ---G AATTC--- 3'; 3' ---CTTAA G--- 5'
Srl56DI		Selenomonas ruminantium 56	5' CTRYAG; 3' GAYRTC	5' ---C TRYAG--- 3'; 3' ---GAYRT C--- 5'
SruI		Selenomonas ruminantium 18D	5' TTTAAA; 3' AAATTT	5' ---TTT AAA--- 3'; 3' ---AAA TTT--- 5'	AhaIII, DraI, PauAII
Sru4DI		Selenomonas ruminantium	5' ATTAAT; 3' TAATTA	5' ---AT TAAT--- 3'; 3' ---TAAT TA--- 5'	AseI, AsnI, BpoAI, PshBI, VspI
Sru30DI		Selenomonas ruminantium 30	5' AGGCCT; 3' TCCGGA	5' ---AGG CCT--- 3'; 3' ---TCC GGA--- 5'	AatI, AspMI, Eco147I, GdiI, PceI, Pme55I, SarI, SseBI, SteI, StuI
SsbI		Streptomyces scabies	5' AAGCTT; 3' TTCGAA	5' ---A AGCTT--- 3'; 3' ---TTCGA A--- 5'
SscL1I		Staphylococcus sp. L1	5' GANTC; 3' CTNAG	5' ---G ANTC--- 3'; 3' ---CTNA G--- 5'
Sse9I		Sporosarcina sp. 9	5' AATT; 3' TTAA	5' --- AATT--- 3'; 3' ---TTAA --- 5'
Sse232I		Streptomyces sp. RH232	5' CGCCGGCG; 3' GCGGCCGC	5' ---CG CCGGCG--- 3'; 3' ---GCGGCC GC--- 5'
Sse1825I		Streptomyces sp.	5' GGGWCCC; 3' CCCWGGG	5' ---GG GWCCC--- 3'; 3' ---CCCWG GG--- 5'
Sse8387I		Streptomyces sp. 8387	5' CCTGCAGG; 3' GGACGTCC	5' ---CCTGCA GG--- 3'; 3' ---GG ACGTCC--- 5'
Sse8647I		Streptomyces sp.	5' AGGWCCT; 3' TCCWGGA	5' ---AG GWCCT--- 3'; 3' ---TCCWG GA--- 5'
SseAI		Streptomyces sp.	5' GGCGCC; 3' CCGCGG	5' ---GG CGCC--- 3'; 3' ---CCGC GG--- 5'
SseBI		Streptomyces sp.	5' AGGCCT; 3' TCCGGA	5' ---AGG CCT--- 3'; 3' ---TCC GGA--- 5'	AatI, AspMI, Eco147I, GdiI, PceI, Pme55I, SarI, Sru30DI, SteI, StuI
SshAI		Salmonella shikmonah	5' CCTNAGG; 3' GGANTCC	5' ---CC TNAGG--- 3'; 3' ---GGANT CC--- 5'	AocI, BliHKI, BspR7I, CvnI, Lmu60I, OxaNI, SauI, SshAI
SsiI		Staphylococcus sciuri RFL1	5' CCGC; 3' GGCG	5' ---C CGC--- 3'; 3' ---GGC G--- 5'	AciI
SsiAI		Staphylococcus sp. A	5' GATC; 3' CTAG	5' --- GATC--- 3'; 3' ---CTAG --- 5'	BscFI, BspAI, **BstKTI**, CpfI, HacI, MkrAI, RalF40I, SauMI
SsiBI		Staphylococcus sp. B	5' GATC; 3' CTAG	5' --- GATC--- 3'; 3' ---CTAG --- 5'	BscFI, BspFI, **BstKTI**, CpfI, HacI, MkrAI, RalF40I, SauMI
SslI		Streptococcus salivarius thermophilus	5' CCWGG; 3' GGWCC	5' ---CC WGG--- 3'; 3' ---GGW CC--- 5'	ApaORI, BseBI, BshGI, BstNI, BstOI, Bst2UI, BthEI, **EcoRII**, MvaI
SsoI		Shigella sonnei 47	5' GAATTC; 3' CTTAAG	5' ---G AATTC--- 3'; 3' ---CTTAA G--- 5'
SsoII		Shigella sonnei 47	5' CCNGG; 3' GGNCC	5' --- CCNGG--- 3'; 3' ---GGNCC --- 5'
SspI		Sphaerotilus sp.	5' AATATT; 3' TTATAA	5' ---AAT ATT--- 3'; 3' ---TTA TAA--- 5'
Ssp1I		Streptomyces sp. RFL1	5' TTCGAA; 3' AAGCTT	5' ---TT CGAA--- 3'; 3' ---AAGC TT--- 5'	AsuII, BimI, Bsp119I, CbiI, MlaI, PlaII, SfuI, SspRFI, SviI
Ssp4800I		Streptomyces sp. BMTU 4800	5' TGTACA; 3' ACATGT	5' ---T GTACA--- 3'; 3' ---ACATG T--- 5'	AauI, / BsmRI, / Bsp1407I, BsrGI, BstAUI, SspBI
Ssp5230I		Streptomyces sp. 5230	5' GACGTC; 3' CTGCAG	5' ---GACGT C--- 3'; 3' ---C TGCAG--- 5'	AatII, ZraI
Ssp27144I		Synechococcus sp.	5' ATCGAT; 3' TAGCTA	5' ---AT CGAT--- 3'; 3' ---TAGC TA--- 5'	BanIII, BavCI, BbvAII, BscI, BspJI, BspOVII, BstNZ169I, ClaI, LcaI
SspAI		Synechococcus sp.	5' CCWGG; 3' GGWCC	5' --- CCWGG--- 3'; 3' ---GGWCC --- 5'	**AeuI**, **AorI**, **Bse17I**, **BspNI**, **Bst2I**, EcoRII, **SniI**, **SslI**, SspAI, **ZanI**
SspBI		Streptomyces sp.	5' TGTACA; 3' ACATGT	5' ---T GTACA--- 3'; 3' ---ACATG T--- 5'	AauI, / BsmRI, / Bsp1407I, BsrGI, BstAUI, Ssp4800I
SspCI		Streptomyces sp.	5' GCCGGC; 3' CGGCCG	5' ---GCC GGC--- 3'; 3' ---CGG CCG--- 5'
SspD5I		Staphylococcus sp. D5	5' GGTGA; 3' CCACT	5' ---GGTGAN_{7}N --- 3'; 3' ---CCACTN_{7}N --- 5'	**AsuHPI**, **HphI**
SspD5II		Staphylococcus sp. D5	5' ATGCAT; 3' TACGTA	5' ---ATGCA T--- 3'; 3' ---T ACGTA--- 5'	Csp68KIII, EcoT22I, Mph1103I, NsiI, PinBI, Ppu10I, SepI, Zsp2I
SspRFI		Synechococcus sp. RF-1	5' TTCGAA; 3' AAGCTT	5' ---TT CGAA--- 3'; 3' ---AAGC TT--- 5'	AsuII, BimI, Bsp119I, CbiI, MlaI, PpaAI, SfuI, Ssp1I, SviI
SsrI		Staphylococcus saprophyticus B6	5' GTTAAC; 3' CAATTG	5' ---GTT AAC--- 3'; 3' ---CAA TTG--- 5'
SstI		Streptomyces stanford	5' GAGCTC; 3' CTCGAG	5' ---GAGCT C--- 3'; 3' ---C TCGAG--- 5'
SstII		Streptomyces stanford	5' CCGCGG; 3' GGCGCC	5' ---CCGC GG--- 3'; 3' ---GG CGCC--- 5'
Sst12I		Streptomyces sp. ST-12	5' CTGCAG; 3' GACGTC	5' ---CTGCA G--- 3'; 3' ---G ACGTC--- 5'	Asp713I, BloHII, BspMAI, BsuBI, CfuII, Psp23I, PstI, SflI, Srl5DI
SteI		Streptomyces tendae	5' AGGCCT; 3' TCCGGA	5' ---AGG CCT--- 3'; 3' ---TCC GGA--- 5'	AatI, AspMI, Eco147I, GdiI, PceI, Pme55I, SarI, Sru30DI, SseBI, StuI
SthI		Salmonella thompson YY356	5' GGTACC; 3' CCATGG	5' ---G GTACC--- 3'; 3' ---CCATG G--- 5'	Acc65I, AhaB8I, Asp718I, **KpnI**,
Sth117I		Streptococcus thermophilus ST117	5' CCWGG; 3' GGWCC	5' ---CC WGG--- 3'; 3' ---GGW CC--- 5'	ApaORI, BseBI, BsiLI, BstNI, BstOI, Bst2UI, **EcoRII**, MvaI, **SspAI**
Sth132I		Streptococcus thermophilus	5' CCCG; 3' GGGC	5' ---CCCGNNNN NNNN--- 3'; 3' ---GGGCNNNNNNNN --- 5'
Sth134I		Streptococcus thermophilus 134	5' CCGG; 3' GGCC	5' ---C CGG--- 3'; 3' ---GGC C--- 5'
Sth368I		Streptococcus thermophilus CNRZ368	5' GATC; 3' CTAG	5' --- GATC--- 3'; 3' ---CTAG --- 5'	BscFI, BspFI, **BstKTI**, CpfI, HacI, MkrAI, RalF40I, SauMI
StrI		Streptomyces thermodiastaticus	5' CTCGAG; 3' GAGCTC	5' ---C TCGAG--- 3'; 3' ---GAGCT C--- 5'	AbrI, BluI, BssHI, MavI, Sau3239I, Sfr274I, TliI, XhoI
StsI		Streptococcus sanguis 54	5' GGATG; 3' CCTAC	5' ---GGATGN_{8}NN NNNN--- 3'; 3' ---CCTACN_{8}NNNNNN --- 5'
StuI		Streptomyces tubercidicus	5' AGGCCT; 3' TCCGGA	5' ---AGG CCT--- 3'; 3' ---TCC GGA--- 5'	AatI, AspMI, Eco147I, GdiI, PceI, SarI, Sru30DI, SseBI, SteI
StyI		Salmonella typhi	5' CCWWGG; 3' GGWWCC	5' ---C CWWGG--- 3'; 3' ---GGWWC C--- 5'
StyD4I		Salmonella typhi D4	5' CCNGG; 3' GGNCC	5' --- CCNGG--- 3'; 3' ---GGNCC --- 5'
SuaI		Sulfolobus acidocaldarius	5' GGCC; 3' CCGG	5' ---GG CC--- 3'; 3' ---CC GG--- 5'
SuiI		Sulfolobus islandicus REN2HI	5' GCWGC; 3' CGWCG	5' ---G CWGC--- 3'; 3' --- CGWC G--- 5'	AceI, ApeKI, Taq52I, TseI
SunI		Synechococcus uniformis	5' CGTACG; 3' GCATGC	5' ---C GTACG--- 3'; 3' ---GCATG C--- 5'
SurI		Sporosarcina ureae 2	5' GGATCC; 3' CCTAGG	5' ---G GATCC--- 3'; 3' ---CCTAG G--- 5'	AccEBI, AliI, ApaCI, AsiI, BamHI, Bce751I, OkrAI, RspLKII, SolI
SviI		Streptomyces violochromogenes	5' TTCGAA; 3' AAGCTT	5' ---TT CGAA--- 3'; 3' ---AAGC TT--- 5'	AsuII, Bpu14I, Bsp119I, CbiI, MlaI, PpaAI, SfuI, Ssp1I
SwaI		Staphylococcus warneri	5' ATTTAAAT; 3' TAAATTTA	5' ---ATTT AAAT--- 3'; 3' ---TAAA TTTA--- 5'
