= Scyllo =

Scyllo may refer to:

- 1D-1-guanidino-3-amino-1,3-dideoxy-scyllo-inositol transaminase (EC 2.6.1.56), an enzyme that catalyzes the chemical reaction 1D-1-guanidino-3-amino-1,3-dideoxy-scyllo-inositol + pyruvate 1D-1-guanidino-1-deoxy-3-dehydro-scyllo-inositol + L-alanine
- Glutamine—scyllo-inositol transaminase (EC 2.6.1.50), an enzyme that catalyzes the chemical reaction L-glutamine + 2,4,6/3,5-pentahydroxycyclohexanone 2-oxoglutaramate + 1-amino-1-deoxy-scyllo-inositol
- Guanidinodeoxy-scyllo-inositol-4-phosphatase (EC 3.1.3.40), an enzyme that catalyzes the chemical reaction 1-guanidino-1-deoxy-scyllo-inositol 4-phosphate + H_{2}O 1-guanidino-1-deoxy-scyllo-inositol + phosphate
- Scyllo-inosamine 4-kinase (EC 2.7.1.65), an enzyme that catalyzes the chemical reaction ATP + 1-amino-1-deoxy-scyllo-inositol ADP + 1-amino-1-deoxy-scyllo-inositol 4-phosphate
- Scyllo-inosamine-4-phosphate amidinotransferase (EC 2.1.4.2), an enzyme that catalyzes the chemical reaction L-arginine + 1-amino-1-deoxy-scyllo-inositol 4-phosphate L-ornithine + 1-guanidino-1-deoxy-scyllo-inositol 4-phosphate
- Scyllo-inositol, a cyclohexanehexol stereoisomer Also known as Scyllitol, Cocositol, Quercinitol, 1,3,5/2,4,6-Hexahydroxycyclohexane
