= A. fimbriatus =

A. fimbriatus may refer to:

- Abacetus fimbriatus, a ground beetle
- Actinomyces fimbriatus, a synonym of Streptomyces fimbriatus, a bacterium
- Agabus fimbriatus, a synonym of Agabus ambiguus, a predaceous diving beetle found in North America
- Amaranthus fimbriatus, a plant found in North America
- Artibeus fimbriatus, the fringed fruit-eating bat, found in South America
- Aulaconotopsis fimbriatus, a longhorn beetle
