= Pentalenolactone synthase =

Enzyme

Identifiers
- EC no.: 1.14.19.8

Databases
- IntEnz: IntEnz view
- BRENDA: BRENDA entry
- ExPASy: NiceZyme view
- KEGG: KEGG entry
- MetaCyc: metabolic pathway
- PRIAM: profile
- PDB structures: RCSB PDB PDBe PDBsum
Search
- PMC: articles
- PubMed: articles
- NCBI: proteins

Pentalenolactone synthase (EC 1.14.19.8, Formerly EC 1.3.7.10, penM (gene), pntM (gene)) is an enzyme with systematic name pentalenolactone-F:oxidized-ferredoxin oxidoreductase (pentalenolactone forming). It catalyses the rearrangement reaction

pentalenolactone F
+ 2 H^{+} + 2 reduced
ferredoxin
O_{2}
2 H_{2}O
O_{2}
2 H_{2}O
pentalenolactone
+ 2 oxidised
ferredoxin

This is heme-thiolate protein (P-450), which is isolated from the bacteria Streptomyces exfoliatus and Streptomyces arenae.The transformation is the final step in the biosynthesis of pentalenolactone.
