= Scyllo-inosamine-4-phosphate amidinotransferase =

Enzyme

Identifiers
- EC no.: 2.1.4.2
- CAS no.: 52227-63-1

Databases
- IntEnz: IntEnz view
- BRENDA: BRENDA entry
- ExPASy: NiceZyme view
- KEGG: KEGG entry
- MetaCyc: metabolic pathway
- PRIAM: profile
- PDB structures: RCSB PDB PDBe PDBsum
- Gene Ontology: AmiGO / QuickGO
Search
- PMC: articles
- PubMed: articles
- NCBI: proteins

Scyllo-inosamine-4-phosphate amidinotransferase (EC 2.1.4.2) is an enzyme that catalyzes a chemical reaction in which the amino acid arginine transfers its guanidine group to a specific stereoisomer of an inositol phosphate containing an amino group, with the production of ornithine as a byproduct:

arginine
+
1
ornithine
+
(2)

1-amino-1-deoxy-scyllo-inositol 4-phosphate (1) is converted to 1-guanidino-1-deoxy-scyllo-inositol 4-phosphate (2). The enzyme was characterised from Streptomyces bluensis and is part of the biosynthetic pathway to streptomycin.

Streptomycin

This enzyme belongs to the family of transferases that transfer one-carbon groups, specifically the amidinotransferases. The systematic name of this enzyme class is L-arginine:1-amino-1-deoxy-scyllo-inositol-4-phosphate amidinotransferase. Other names in common use include L-arginine:inosamine-P-amidinotransferase, inosamine-P amidinotransferase, L-arginine:inosamine phosphate amidinotransferase, and inosamine-phosphate amidinotransferase.

== Structural studies ==
As of late 2007, only one structure has been solved for this class of enzymes, with the PDB accession code 1BWD.
