= Gougerotin =

Chemical compound

Identifiers
- CAS Number: 2096-42-6
- PubChem CID: 11226719
- ChemSpider: 9401772
- UNII: ALH0452B20
- ChEBI: CHEBI:156351
- CompTox Dashboard (EPA): DTXSID601016880

Chemical and physical data
- Formula: C_{16}H_{25}N_{7}O_{8}
- Molar mass: 443.417 g·mol^{−1}
- 3D model (JSmol): Interactive image
- SMILES: CNCC(=O)NC(CO)C(=O)NC1C(C(C(OC1C(=O)N)N2C=CC(=NC2=O)N)O)O

Gougerotin is a water-soluble pyrimidine-based antibiotic which is produced by the bacteria Streptomyces graminearus and Streptomyces gougerotii. Gougerotin is named after the dermatologist Henri-Eugène Gougerot. Gougerotin has activity against Gram-positive and Gram-negative bacteria as well as against viruses.
