= Streptomyces alanosinicus =

Scientific classification
- Domain: Bacteria
- Kingdom: Bacillati
- Phylum: Actinomycetota
- Class: Actinomycetes
- Order: Streptomycetales
- Family: Streptomycetaceae
- Genus: Streptomyces
- Species: S. alanosinicus

Binomial name
- Streptomyces alanosinicus Thiemann and Beretta 1966 (Approved Lists 1980)

Type strain
- AS 4.1634, ATCC 15710, BCRC 16211, CBS 348.69, CBS 794.72, CCRC 16211, CGMCC 4.1634, DSM 40606, HAMBI 983, IFO 13493, ISP 5606, JCM 4714, KCC S-0714, KCTC 9683, Lepetit V/119, NBRC 13493, NRRL B-3627, NRRL-ISP 5606, RIA 1454, V119, VKM Ac-1752

Species of bacterium

Streptomyces alanosinicus is a bacterium species from the genus of Streptomyces which was isolated from soil in Brazil. Streptomyces alanosinicus produces the antibiotics alanosine and spicamycin.

== See also ==
- List of Streptomyces species
