= Scyllo-inosamine 4-kinase =

Enzyme

Identifiers
- EC no.: 2.7.1.65
- CAS no.: 37278-08-3

Databases
- IntEnz: IntEnz view
- BRENDA: BRENDA entry
- ExPASy: NiceZyme view
- KEGG: KEGG entry
- MetaCyc: metabolic pathway
- PRIAM: profile
- PDB structures: RCSB PDB PDBe PDBsum
- Gene Ontology: AmiGO / QuickGO
Search
- PMC: articles
- PubMed: articles
- NCBI: proteins

Scyllo-inosamine 4-kinase (EC 2.7.1.65) is an enzyme that catalyzes the chemical reaction

ATP +
1-amino-1-deoxy-scyllo-inositol
ADP +
1-amino-1-deoxy-scyllo-inositol 4-phosphate

The enzyme characterised from Streptomyces bikiniensis converts 1-amino-1-deoxy-scyllo-inositol to 1-amino-1-deoxy-scyllo-inositol 4-phosphate by transferring a phosphate group from the cofactor, adenosine triphosphate (ATP), which is converted to adenosine diphosphate (ADP). This reaction is part of the biosynthesis of streptomycin.

This enzyme is a transferase, specifically one transferring phosphorus-containing groups (phosphotransferases) with an alcohol group as acceptor. The systematic name of this enzyme class is ATP:1-amino-1-deoxy-scyllo-inositol 4-phosphotransferase. Other names in common use include scyllo-inosamine kinase (phosphorylating), scyllo-inosamine kinase, and ATP:inosamine phosphotransferase.
