= Streptomyces graminearus =

Scientific classification
- Domain: Bacteria
- Kingdom: Bacillati
- Phylum: Actinomycetota
- Class: Actinomycetes
- Order: Streptomycetales
- Family: Streptomycetaceae
- Genus: Streptomyces
- Species: S. graminearus

Binomial name
- Streptomyces graminearus Preobrazhenskaya 1986

Type strain
- CGMCC 4.1941, DSM 41474, IFO 15420, INA 13982, JCM 6923, LMG 19904, NBRC 15420, NRRL B-16369, VKM Ac-1847

Species of bacterium

Streptomyces graminearus is a bacterium species from the genus of Streptomyces. Streptomyces graminearus produces the antibiotic gougerotin.

== See also ==
- List of Streptomyces species
