= Guanidinodeoxy-scyllo-inositol-4-phosphatase =

Class of enzymes

Identifiers
- EC no.: 3.1.3.40
- CAS no.: 9055-28-1

Databases
- BRENDA: enzyme data
- ExPASy: NiceZyme view
- KEGG: enzyme entry
- MetaCyc: metabolic pathway
- Rhea: reactions
- PDB structures: RCSB PDB PDBe PDBsum
- Gene Ontology: AmiGO / QuickGO
Search
- PMC: articles
- PubMed: articles
- NCBI: proteins

The enzyme guanidinodeoxy-scyllo-inositol-4-phosphatase (EC 3.1.3.40) catalyzes the reaction

1-guanidino-1-deoxy-scyllo-inositol 4-phosphate
H_{2}O
P_{i}
1-guanidino-1-deoxy-scyllo-inositol

The enzyme characterised from Streptomyces bikiniensis hydrolyses 1-guanidino-1-deoxy-scyllo-inositol 4-phosphate to 1-guanidino-1-deoxy-scyllo-inositol and orthophosphate. The reaction is part of the biosynthesis of the antibiotic streptomycin in that bacterium.

This enzyme is a hydrolase, specifically one acting on phosphoric monoester bonds. The systematic name is 1-guanidino-1-deoxy-scyllo-inositol-4-phosphate 4-phosphohydrolase. Other names in common use include 1-guanidino-scyllo-inositol 4-phosphatase, and 1-guanidino-1-deoxy-scyllo-inositol-4-P phosphohydrolase.
