= Glutamine—scyllo-inositol transaminase =

Glutamine-scyllo-inositol transaminase

Identifiers
- EC no.: 2.6.1.50
- CAS no.: 9033-03-8

Databases
- IntEnz: IntEnz view
- BRENDA: BRENDA entry
- ExPASy: NiceZyme view
- KEGG: KEGG entry
- MetaCyc: metabolic pathway
- PRIAM: profile
- PDB structures: RCSB PDB PDBe PDBsum
- Gene Ontology: AmiGO / QuickGO
Search
- PMC: articles
- PubMed: articles
- NCBI: proteins

Glutamine-scyllo-inositol transaminase (EC 2.6.1.50) is a pyridoxal phosphate-dependent enzyme that catalyzes the chemical reaction

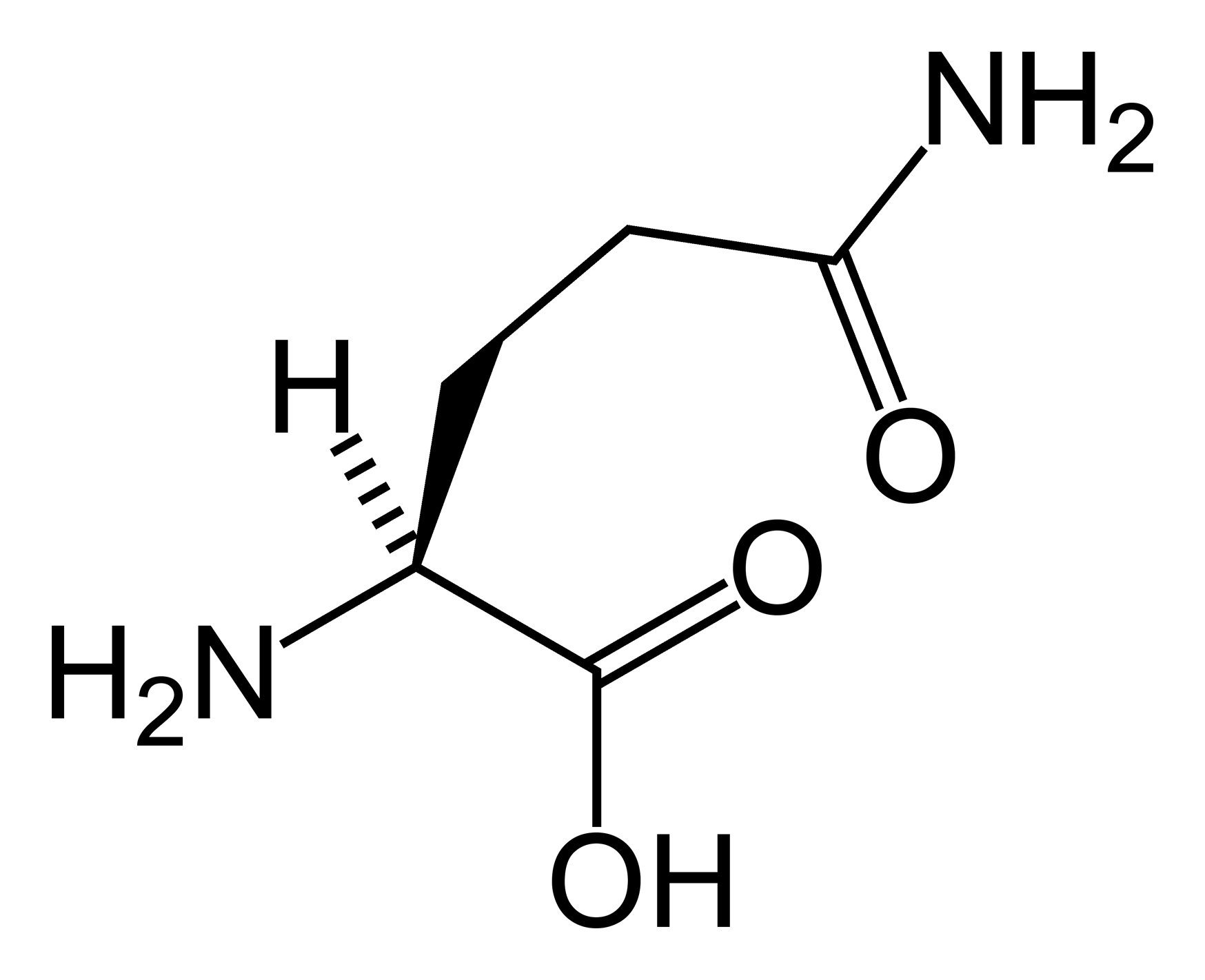
L-glutamine
+
(1)
2-oxoglutaramic acid
+
(2)

The two substrates of this enzyme are L-glutamine and the inositol derivative, 2,4,6/3,5-pentahydroxycyclohexanone (1). Its products are 2-oxoglutaramic acid and 1-amino-1-deoxy-scyllo-inositol (2). The reaction is part of the biosynthesis of streptomycin in Streptomyces bikiniensis.

Streptomycin

This enzyme is a transferase, specifically a transaminase, which transfer nitrogenous groups. The systematic name of this enzyme class is L-glutamine:2,4,6/3,5-pentahydroxycyclohexanone aminotransferase. Other names in common use include glutamine scyllo-inosose aminotransferase, L-glutamine-keto-scyllo-inositol aminotransferase, glutamine-scyllo-inosose transaminase, and L-glutamine-scyllo-inosose transaminase.
