= Streptomyces olivoverticillatus =

Scientific classification
- Domain: Bacteria
- Kingdom: Bacillati
- Phylum: Actinomycetota
- Class: Actinomycetes
- Order: Streptomycetales
- Family: Streptomycetaceae
- Genus: Streptomyces
- Species: S. olivoverticillatus

Binomial name
- Streptomyces olivoverticillatus (Shinobu 1956) Witt and Stackebrandt 1991

Type strain
- ATCC 25480, BCRC 13610, CBS 890.69, CCRC 13610, CECT 3266, CEST 3266, CGMCC 4.1980, DSM 40250, DSMZ 40250, ETH 24439, ETH 24481, ETH 28537, IFO 13068, IFO 15273, IFO 3842, IFO 3929, IPV 2009, IPV 964, ISP 5250, JCM 4100, JCM 4501, KCC S-0100, KCC S-0501, KCCS- 0501, KCCS-0100, KCTC 9871, MTCC 333, NBRC 13068, NBRC 15273, NBRC 3842, NBRC 3929, NCIB 97148, NCIMB 9714, NCIMB 97148, NRRL B-1994, NRRL ISP-5250, NRRL-ISP 5250, OEU 383, RIA 1260, RIA 551, Shinobu 383, VKM Ac-890

Synonyms
- "Streptomyces olivoverticillatus" Shinobu 1956; Streptomyces viridoflavum (Locci and Schofield 1989) Witt and Stackebrandt 1991; Streptomyces viridiflavus corrig. (Locci and Schofield 1989) Witt and Stackebrandt 1991; Streptoverticillium olivoverticillatum (Shinobu 1956) Baldacci et al. 1966 (Approved Lists 1980); Streptoverticillium viridoflavum (ex Waksman and Taber 1953) Locci and Schofield 1989; "Verticillomyces olivoverticillatus" (Shinobu 1956) Shinobu 1965

Species of bacterium

Streptomyces olivoverticillatus is a bacterium species from the genus of Streptomyces which has been isolated from soil in Japan. Streptomyces olivoverticillatus produces trichomycin.

== See also ==
- List of Streptomyces species
