= Streptomyces diastaticus =

Scientific classification
- Domain: Bacteria
- Kingdom: Bacillati
- Phylum: Actinomycetota
- Class: Actinomycetes
- Order: Streptomycetales
- Family: Streptomycetaceae
- Genus: Streptomyces
- Species: S. diastaticus

Binomial name
- Streptomyces diastaticus Waksman and Henrici 1948

Type strain
- AS 4.1420, ATCC 3315, BCRC 15168, CBS 126.20, CBS 713.72, CCM 3167, CCRC 15168, CCUG 11116, CGMCC 4.1420, DSM 40496, ETH 16837, ETH 28506, ETH 9878, ICMP 500, IFO 13412, IFO 3714, IMET 40274, IMRU 3315, ISP 5496, JCM 4128, JCM 4745, KCC S-0128, KCC S-0745, Lanoot R-8684, LMG 19322, MTCC 1394, NBRC 13412, NBRC 3714, NRRL B-1241, NRRL B-1270, NRRL B-B-1270, NRRL-ISP 5496, PSA 148, R-8684, RIA 104, RIA 1373, VKM Ac-723

Synonyms
- "Actinomyces diastaticus" Krainsky 1914; "Actinomyces gougeroti" Duché 1934; "Actinomyces rutgersensis" Waksman and Curtis 1916; Streptomyces diastaticus subsp. ardesiacus (Baldacci et al. 1955) Pridham et al. 1958 (Approved Lists 1980); Streptomyces diastaticus subsp. diastaticus (Krainsky 1914) Pridham et al. 1958 (Approved Lists 1980); Streptomyces rutgersensis (Waksman and Curtis 1916) Waksman and Henrici 1948 (Approved Lists 1980); Streptomyces gougerotii (Duché 1934) Waksman and Henrici 1948 (Approved Lists 1980)

Species of bacterium

Streptomyces diastaticus is an alkaliphilic and thermophilic bacterium species from the genus of Streptomyces. Streptomyces diastaticus produces oligomycin A, oligomycin C, rimocidin and the leukotriene-A4 hydrolase-inhibitor 8(S)-amino-2(R)-methyl-7-oxononanoic acid. Streptomyces diastaticus also produces gougerotin and diastaphenazine and the antibiotic ruticin.

== See also ==
- List of Streptomyces species
