= Spicamycin =

Names
- IUPAC name N-[2-[[2-(1,2-dihydroxyethyl)-4,5-dihydroxy-6-(7H-purin-6-ylamino)oxan-3-yl]amino]-2-oxoethyl]-14-methylpentadecanamide
- Other names Septacidin, NSC65104

Identifiers
| CAS Number | 87099-85-2 |
| 3D model (JSmol) | Interactive image |
| ChEBI | CHEBI:80079 |
| ChEMBL | ChEMBL1702321 |
| ChemSpider | 432387 |
| KEGG | C15751 |
| PubChem CID | 494023 |
| CompTox Dashboard (EPA) | DTXSID40977909 |
- InChI: InChI=1S/C30H51N7O7/c1-19(2)13-11-9-7-5-3-4-6-8-10-12-14-21(40)31-15-22(41)36-23-25(42)26(43)30(44-27(23)20(39)16-38)37-29-24-28(33-17-32-24)34-18-35-29/h17-20,23,25-27,30,38-39,42-43H,3-16H2,1-2H3,(H,31,40)(H,36,41)(H2,32,33,34,35,37) Key: YBZRLMLGUBIIDN-UHFFFAOYSA-N
- SMILES: N(C1=C2C(N=CN2)=NC=N1)[C@H]3O[C@@]([C@H](CO)O)([C@H](NC(CNC(CCCCCCCCCCCCC(C)C)=O)=O)[C@@H](O)[C@H]3O)[H]

Properties
| Chemical formula | C_{30}H_{51}N_{7}O_{7} |
| Molar mass | 621.780 g·mol^{−1} |
- Except where otherwise noted, data are given for materials in their standard state (at 25 °C [77 °F], 100 kPa). Infobox references

Spicamycin is an antibiotic with the molecular formula C_{30}H_{51}N_{7}O_{7} which is produced by the bacterium Streptomyces alanosinicus. Spicamycin also shows antitumor activity.
