= Streptomyces olivochromogenes =

Scientific classification
- Domain: Bacteria
- Kingdom: Bacillati
- Phylum: Actinomycetota
- Class: Actinomycetes
- Order: Streptomycetales
- Family: Streptomycetaceae
- Genus: Streptomyces
- Species: S. olivochromogenes

Binomial name
- Streptomyces olivochromogenes Waksman and Henrici 1948

Type strain
- ATCC 25479, ATCC 3336, BCRC 15163, CBS 889.69, CCRC 15163, CGMCC 4.2000, DSM 40451, ETH 11886, ETH 14310, ETH 9517, IFO 13067, IFO 3178, IMET 40352, IMRU 3336, ISP 5451, JCM 4163, JCM 4500, KCC S-016, KCC S-0500, KCTC 9064, NBRC 1306, NBRC 3178, NRRL B-1341, NRRL-ISP 5451, PSA 144, RIA 1259, Waksman 205

Synonyms
- Actinomyces olivochromogenus

Species of bacterium

Streptomyces olivochromogenes is a bacterium species from the genus of Streptomyces which has been isolated from soil. Streptomyces olivochromogenes produces ferulic acid. The xylose isomerase from Streptomyces olivochromogenes is used in the food industry.

== See also ==
- List of Streptomyces species
