= Staphylococcus arlettae =

Scientific classification
- Domain: Bacteria
- Kingdom: Bacillati
- Phylum: Bacillota
- Class: Bacilli
- Order: Bacillales
- Family: Staphylococcaceae
- Genus: Staphylococcus
- Species: S. arlettae

Binomial name
- Staphylococcus arlettae Schliefer et al. 1985

Species of bacterium

Staphylococcus arlettae is a gram-positive, coagulase-negative member of the bacterial genus Staphylococcus consisting of clustered cocci. It has been isolated from the skin of mammals and birds and is novobiocin resistant. A strain of this species isolated from effluent from a textile factory was found to be able to degrade azo dyes.

Some strains of S. arlettae are highly salt tolerant and commonly found in marine environment. S.I. Paul et al. (2021) isolated and identified salt tolerant strains of S. arlettae (strains ISP142A, ISP172C and ISP192A) from Cliona viridis sponges of the Saint Martin's Island Area of the Bay of Bengal, Bangladesh.

== Biochemical characteristics of S. arlettae ==
Colony, morphological, physiological, and biochemical characteristics of marine S. arlettae are shown in the Table below.

Test type	Test	Characteristics
Colony characters	Size	Small / Medium
Colony characters	Type	Round
Colony characters	Color	Whitish
Colony characters	Shape	Convex
Morphological characters	Shape	Cocci
Physiological characters	Motility	-
Physiological characters	Growth at 6.5% NaCl	+
Biochemical characters	Gram's staining	+
Biochemical characters	Oxidase	–
Biochemical characters	Catalase	+
Biochemical characters	Oxidative-Fermentative	Oxidative
Biochemical characters	Motility	–
Biochemical characters	Methyl Red	–
Biochemical characters	Voges-Proskauer	+
Biochemical characters	Indole	–
Biochemical characters	H_{2}S Production	+
Biochemical characters	Urease	+
Biochemical characters	Nitrate reductase	+
Biochemical characters	β-Galactosidase	–
Hydrolysis of	Gelatin	+
Hydrolysis of	Aesculin	+
Hydrolysis of	Casein	+
Hydrolysis of	Tween 40	+
Hydrolysis of	Tween 60	+
Hydrolysis of	Tween 80	+
Acid production from	Glycerol	+
Acid production from	Galactose	+
Acid production from	D-Glucose	+
Acid production from	D-Fructose	+
Acid production from	D-Mannose	+
Acid production from	Mannitol	+
Acid production from	N-Acetylglucosamine	+
Acid production from	Amygdalin	+
Acid production from	Maltose	+
Acid production from	D-Melibiose	+
Acid production from	D-Trehalose	+
Acid production from	Glycogen	+
Acid production from	D-Turanose	+

Note: + = Positive, – =Negative
