= Streptomyces thermodiastaticus =

Scientific classification
- Domain: Bacteria
- Kingdom: Bacillati
- Phylum: Actinomycetota
- Class: Actinomycetes
- Order: Streptomycetales
- Family: Streptomycetaceae
- Genus: Streptomyces
- Species: S. thermodiastaticus

Binomial name
- Streptomyces thermodiastaticus Waksman 1953

Type strain
- ATCC 27472, BCRC 12492, BCRC 12636, CBS 769.72, CCRC 12492, CCRC 12636, CGMCC 4.1759, CUB 387, DSM 40573, HUT-6606, IFO 13468, IFO 16608, IFO 16617, IFO 16689, ISP 5573, JCM 4840, NBRC 100020, NBRC 13468, NBRC 16608, NBRC 16689, NRRL B-5316, NRRL-ISP 5573, RIA 1429

Synonyms
- Actinomyces thermodiastaticus

Species of bacterium

Streptomyces thermodiastaticus is a bacterium species from the genus of Streptomyces. Streptomyces thermodiastaticus produces a lytic enzyme against Candida albicans.

== See also ==
- List of Streptomyces species
