= Pseudoselenomonas ruminantium =

Scientific classification
- Domain: Bacteria
- Kingdom: Bacillati
- Phylum: Bacillota
- Class: Negativicutes
- Order: Selenomonadales
- Family: Selenomonadaceae
- Genus: Pseudoselenomonas
- Species: P. ruminantium

Binomial name
- Pseudoselenomonas ruminantium (Certes 1889) Heng and Kittelmann 2026

Type strain
- GA192 (= ATCC 12561 = DSM 2150)

Synonyms
- Selenomonas ruminantium (Certes 1889) Wenyon 1926 (Approved Lists 1980)

Species of rumen bacterium

Pseudoselenomonas ruminantium is a species of obligately anaerobic, Gram-negative, motile bacteria in the family Selenomonadaceae. Its cells are curved or crescent-shaped rods, and it was originally isolated from the bovine rumen. The type strain is GA192, also deposited as ATCC 12561 and DSM 2150.

== Taxonomy ==
The organism was originally described as "Ancyromonas ruminantium" in 1889 and was later classified as Selenomonas ruminantium. The former species included the subspecies S. ruminantium subsp. ruminantium and S. ruminantium subsp. lactilytica.

Phylogenetic and comparative genomic analyses published in 2026 placed the type-bearing taxon in the new genus Pseudoselenomonas as Pseudoselenomonas ruminantium. The former subspecies S. ruminantium subsp. lactilytica was recognized as a separate species, Pseudoselenomonas lactilytica.

== Characteristics and metabolism ==
Strain GA192 ferments glucose and produces L-lactate but does not ferment lactate. Under glucose-limited continuous culture, it produces predominantly propionate and acetate at lower growth rates, with proportionally greater lactate production at higher growth rates.

GA192 can use arabinose, xylose, and xylo-oligosaccharides ranging from xylobiose to xylopentaose, as well as larger xylo-oligosaccharides. In coculture, the strain can consume soluble xylo-oligosaccharides released during the degradation of xylan by Butyrivibrio fibrisolvens, demonstrating metabolic cross-feeding between rumen bacteria.

A bifunctional glycoside hydrolase family 43 β-D-xylosidase/α-L-arabinofuranosidase from the species has been characterized biochemically and by X-ray crystallography.
