= Streptomyces fimbriatus =

Scientific classification
- Domain: Bacteria
- Kingdom: Bacillati
- Phylum: Actinomycetota
- Class: Actinomycetes
- Order: Streptomycetales
- Family: Streptomycetaceae
- Genus: Streptomyces
- Species: S. fimbriatus

Binomial name
- Streptomyces fimbriatus (Millard and Burr 1926) Waksman and Lechevalier 1953 (Approved Lists 1980)

Type strain
- AS 4.1598, ATCC 15051, CBS 453.65, CGMCC 4.1598, DSM 40942, IFO 15411, JCM 5080, KCTC 19940, MTCC 1768, NBRC 15411, NCIMB 13039, NRRL B-3175, SC-3683, Squibb SC-3683, VKM Ac-761

Synonyms
- "Actinomyces fimbriatus" Millard and Burr 1926

Species of bacterium

Streptomyces fimbriatus is a bacterium species from the genus of Streptomyces which has been isolated from soil. Streptomyces fimbriatus produces septacidin and cephamycin B .

== See also ==
- List of Streptomyces species
