= Streptomyces griseoruber =

Scientific classification
- Domain: Bacteria
- Kingdom: Bacillati
- Phylum: Actinomycetota
- Class: Actinomycetes
- Order: Streptomycetales
- Family: Streptomycetaceae
- Genus: Streptomyces
- Species: S. griseoruber

Binomial name
- Streptomyces griseoruber Yamaguchi and Saburi 1955

Type strain
- AS 4.1417, ATCC 23919, BCRC 11826, CBS 903.68, CCRC 11826, CCUG 11117, CGMCC 4.1417, DSM 40281, ETH 24128, H-4650, HAMBI 1051, ICSSB 1013, IFO 12873, IID H-4650, ISP 5281, JCM 4200, JCM 4642, KCC S-0200, KCC S-0642, Lanoot R-8687, LMG 19325, NBRC 12873, NRRL B-1818, NRRL-ISP 5281, R-8687, RIA 1195, VKM Ac-1900, VKMAc-1900

Species of bacterium

Streptomyces griseoruber is a bacterium species from the genus of Streptomyces which has been isolated from soil in Japan. Streptomyces griseoruber produces beromycin, actinomycin D, gombapyrone A, gombapyrone B, gombapyrone C, gombapyrone D and rhodomycins

== See also ==
- List of Streptomyces species
