= Streptomyces arenae =

Scientific classification
- Domain: Bacteria
- Kingdom: Bacillati
- Phylum: Actinomycetota
- Class: Actinomycetia
- Order: Streptomycetales
- Family: Streptomycetaceae
- Genus: Streptomyces
- Species: S. arenae

Binomial name
- Streptomyces arenae Pridham et al. 1958

Type strain
- AS 4.161, AS 4.1610, ATCC 25428, BCRC 11827, CBS 926.69, CCRC 11827, CGMCC 4.1610, DSM 40293, ETH 24429, ICMP 950, IFO 13016, ISP 5293, JCM 4452, KCC S-0452, NA 269-M2, NBRC 13016, NRRL 2377, NRRL-ISP 5293, NZRCC 10323, RIA 1208, VKAc 1201, VKM Ac-1201

Species of bacterium

Streptomyces arenae is a bacterium species from the genus Streptomyces which has been isolated from soil from Illinois in the United States. Streptomyces arenae produces pentalenolactone, 2,5-dihydrophenylalanine, naphthocyclinone and arenaemycine.

== See also ==
- List of Streptomyces species
