= 1D-1-guanidino-3-amino-1,3-dideoxy-scyllo-inositol transaminase =

Enzyme

Identifiers
- EC no.: 2.6.1.56
- CAS no.: 57127-19-2

Databases
- IntEnz: IntEnz view
- BRENDA: BRENDA entry
- ExPASy: NiceZyme view
- KEGG: KEGG entry
- MetaCyc: metabolic pathway
- PRIAM: profile
- PDB structures: RCSB PDB PDBe PDBsum
- Gene Ontology: AmiGO / QuickGO
Search
- PMC: articles
- PubMed: articles
- NCBI: proteins

In enzymology, a 1D-1-guanidino-3-amino-1,3-dideoxy-scyllo-inositol transaminase (EC 2.6.1.56) is an enzyme that catalyzes the chemical reaction

1D-1-guanidino-3-amino-1,3-dideoxy-scyllo-inositol + pyruvate $\rightleftharpoons$ 1D-1-guanidino-1-deoxy-3-dehydro-scyllo-inositol + L-alanine

Thus, the two substrates of this enzyme are 1D-1-guanidino-3-amino-1,3-dideoxy-scyllo-inositol and pyruvate, whereas its two products are 1D-1-guanidino-1-deoxy-3-dehydro-scyllo-inositol and L-alanine.

This enzyme belongs to the family of transferases, specifically the transaminases, which transfer nitrogenous groups. The systematic name of this enzyme class is 1D-1-guanidino-3-amino-1,3-dideoxy-scyllo-inositol:pyruvate aminotransferase. Other names in common use include guanidinoaminodideoxy-scyllo-inositol-pyruvate aminotransferase, and L-alanine-N-amidino-3-(or 5-)keto-scyllo-inosamine transaminase.
