= Aulaconotopsis =

Scientific classification
- Kingdom: Animalia
- Phylum: Arthropoda
- Class: Insecta
- Order: Coleoptera
- Suborder: Polyphaga
- Infraorder: Cucujiformia
- Family: Cerambycidae
- Genus: Aulaconotopsis
- Species: A. fimbriatus

Binomial name
- Aulaconotopsis fimbriatus Breuning, 1940

Genus of beetles

Aulaconotopsis fimbriatus is a species of beetle in the family Cerambycidae, and the only species in the genus Aulaconotopsis. It was described by Breuning in 1940.
