= Streptomyces lusitanus =

Scientific classification
- Domain: Bacteria
- Kingdom: Bacillati
- Phylum: Actinomycetota
- Class: Actinomycetes
- Order: Streptomycetales
- Family: Streptomycetaceae
- Genus: Streptomyces
- Species: S. lusitanus

Binomial name
- Streptomyces lusitanus Villax 1963 (Approved Lists 1980)

Type strain
- ATCC 15842, ATCC 27444, BCRC 11552, BCRC 15114, CBS 500.62, CBS 765.72, CCRC 11552, CCRC 15114, CECT 3162, CGMCC 4.1745, DSM 40568, IFO 13314, IFO 13464, ISP 5568, JCM 4785, KCC S-0785, KCCS-0785, KCTC 19072, NBRC 13314, NBRC 13464, NCIB 9451, NCIB 9585, NCIMB 9451, NCIMB 9585, NRRL B-12501, NRRL B-5637, NRRL B-B-12501, NRRL-ISP 5568, ptcc1196, RIA 1425, VKM Ac-1194, VTT E-011976

Species of bacterium

Streptomyces lusitanus is a bacterium species from the genus of Streptomyces which has been isolated from soil. Streptomyces lusitanus produces 7-chlortetracycline, naphthyridinomycin, cyanocycline B, N-desmethylnaphthyridinomycin and tetracycline.

== See also ==
- List of Streptomyces species
