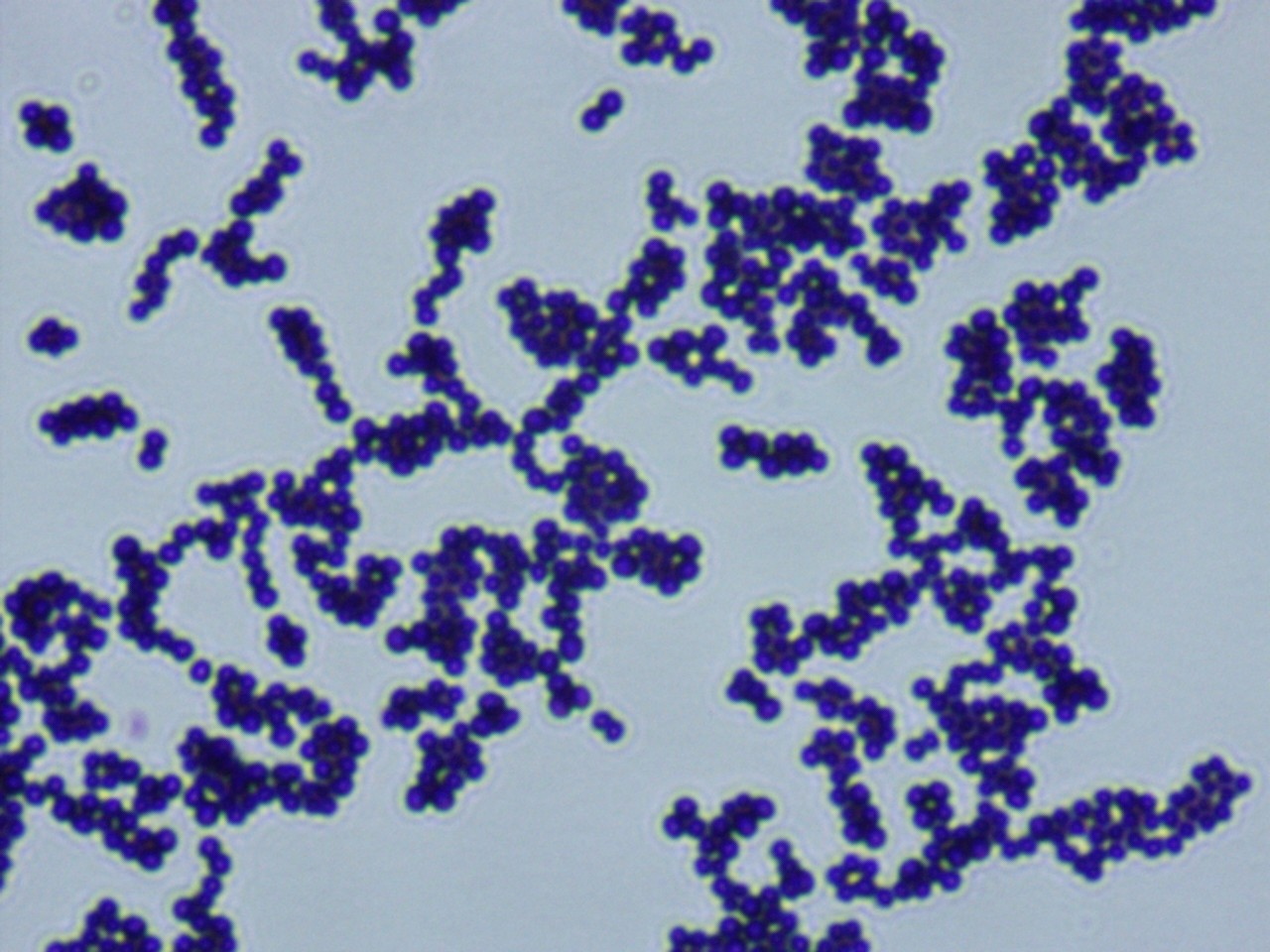
- Staphylococcus cohnii gram stain

Scientific classification
- Domain: Bacteria
- Kingdom: Bacillati
- Phylum: Bacillota
- Class: Bacilli
- Order: Caryophanales
- Family: Staphylococcaceae
- Genus: Staphylococcus
- Species: S. cohnii

Binomial name
- Staphylococcus cohnii Schleifer and Kloos 1975 (Approved Lists 1980)

= Staphylococcus cohnii =

Species of bacterium

Staphylococcus cohnii is a Gram-positive, coagulase-negative member of the bacterial genus Staphylococcus consisting of clustered cocci. The species commonly lives on human skin; clinical isolates have shown high levels of antibiotic resistance. A strain of S. cohnii was found to contain a mobile genetic element very similar to the staphylococcal cassette chromosome encoding methicillin resistance element seen in Staphylococcus aureus.
