= Streptomyces bluensis =

Scientific classification
- Domain: Bacteria
- Kingdom: Bacillati
- Phylum: Actinomycetota
- Class: Actinomycetes
- Order: Streptomycetales
- Family: Streptomycetaceae
- Genus: Streptomyces
- Species: S. bluensis

Binomial name
- Streptomyces bluensis Mason et al. 1963

Type strain
- AS 4.1463, ATCC 27420, BCRC 15180, CBS 239.69, CBS 761.72, CCRC 15180, CGMCC 4.1463, DSM 40564, IFO 13460, ISP 5564, JCM 4729, KCC S-0729, KCCS-0729, LMG 5969, NBRC 13460, NCIB 9754, NCIMB 9754, NRRL 2876, NRRL-ISP 5564, RIA 1421, UC 2478, Upjohn Co. UC-12898

Species of bacterium

Streptomyces bluensis is a bacterium species from the genus of Streptomyces which produces bluensomycin.

== See also ==
- List of Streptomyces species
