= Streptomyces exfoliatus =

Scientific classification
- Domain: Bacteria
- Kingdom: Bacillati
- Phylum: Actinomycetota
- Class: Actinomycetes
- Order: Streptomycetales
- Family: Streptomycetaceae
- Genus: Streptomyces
- Species: S. exfoliatus

Binomial name
- Streptomyces exfoliatus (Waksman and Curtis 1916) Waksman and Henrici 1948 (Approved Lists 1980)

Type strain
- AS 4.1407, ATCC 12627, ATCC 19750, BCRC 11469, CBS 489.68, CCM 3169, CCRC 11469, CCUG 11113, CGMCC 4.1407, CIP 108233, DSM 40060, ETH 24304, ETH 24436, HJ Kutzner, ICMP 1008, IFO 13191, IMRU 3316, ISP 5060, JCM 4366, KCC S-0366, KCCS-0366, Lanoot R-8667, LMG 19307, NBRC 13191, NCIMB 12599, NRLL B-1237, NRRL B-1237, NRRL B-2924, NRRL-ISP 5014, NRRL-ISP 5060, NZRCC 10331, PCM 2367, PSA 222, R-8667, RIA 1031, RIA 757, SAW 3316, UNIQEM 137, VKM Ac-767, VTT E-86262, Waksman 3316

Synonyms
- "Actinomyces exfoliatus" Waksman and Curtis 1916

Species of bacterium

Streptomyces exfoliatus is a bacterium species from the genus of Streptomyces which has been isolated from soil. Streptomyces exfoliatus has the ability to degrade poly(3-hydroxyalkanoate). This species produces exfoliatin and exfoliamycin.

== See also ==
- List of Streptomyces species
