= Streptomyces bikiniensis =

Scientific classification
- Domain: Bacteria
- Kingdom: Bacillati
- Phylum: Actinomycetota
- Class: Actinomycetes
- Order: Streptomycetales
- Family: Streptomycetaceae
- Genus: Streptomyces
- Species: S. bikiniensis

Binomial name
- Streptomyces bikiniensis Johnstone and Waksman 1947

Type strain
- AS 4.0569, AS 4.569, ATCC 11062, BCRC 15171, BCRC 16282, CBS 412.54, CCRC 15171, CCRC 16282, CGMCC 4.0569, DSM 40581, ETH 14303, ETH 21195, HUT-6084, IAM 19, IAM 68, IFM 1057, IFO 13198, IFO 14598, IMET 41362, IMRU 3514, ISP 5581, JCM 4011, KCC S-0011, KCTC 9172, Lanoot R-8733, LMG 19367, MTCC 1539, NBIMCC 1504, NBRC 13198, NBRC 14598, NRRL B-1049, NRRL B-2690, NRRL B-B-2690, NRRL-ISP 5581, PSA 41, R-8733, RIA 471, RIA 74, VKM Ac-999, VKM Ac-999., VTT E-82155, Waksman 3514, WC 3514

Species of bacterium

Streptomyces bikiniensis is a bacterium species from the genus Streptomyces which has isolated from soil from the island Bikini Atoll. Streptomyces bikiniensis produces streptomycin II and carboxypeptidase.

== See also ==
- List of Streptomyces species
