= Kodanuki Wetland =

Wetland near Mount Fuji, Japan

Coordinates: 35.3521°N 138.5561°E

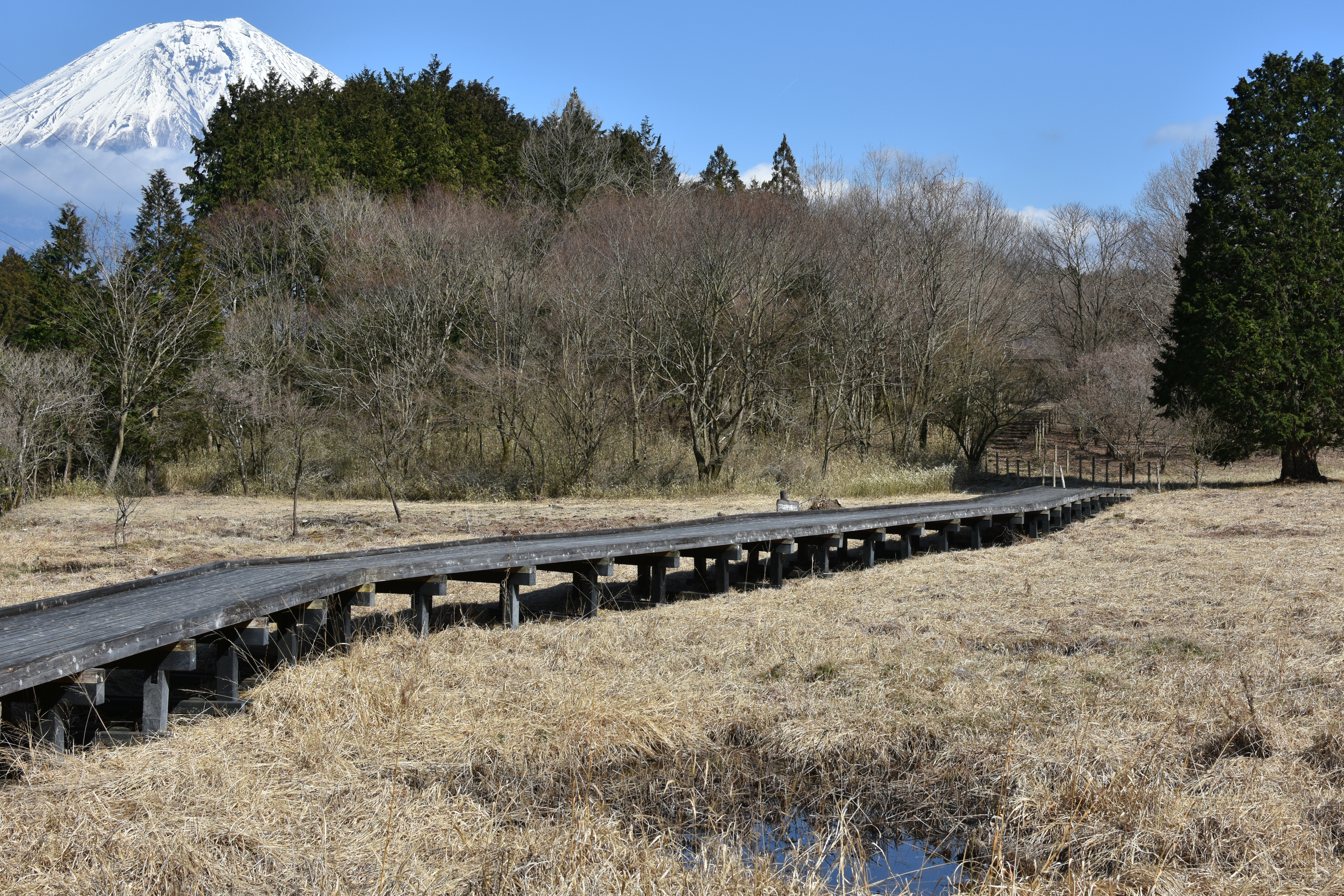
Kodanuki Wetland

Kodanuki Wetland (小田貫湿原, Kodanukishitsugen) is a wetland located in Fujinomiya City, Shizuoka Prefecture. It is located in Fuji-Hakone-Izu National Park.

== Overview ==
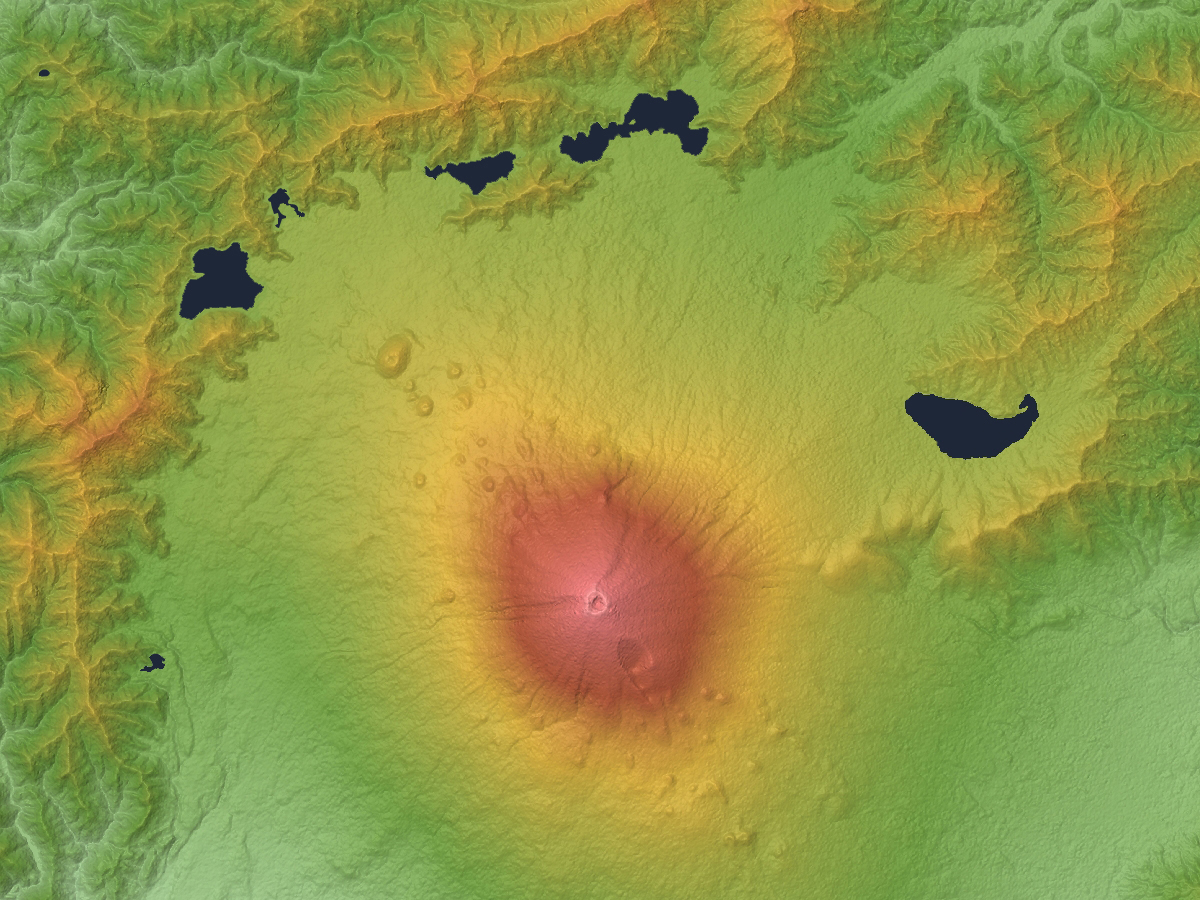
Location of Kodanuki Wetland in relation to Mount Fuji

It is the only wetland remaining at the western foothill of Mount Fuji, and has been designated as an "Important wetland" and an "Important Satochi-Satoyama" by the Ministry of the Environment. The altitude ranges from 670 to 690 m (2,200 to 2,260 ft), with an area of 1.75 ha (4.3 acres). It is dotted with over 125 lakes of various sizes, and is located on a layer of black soil above the old Fuji mudflow.

== See also ==
- Raised bog
