= Streptomyces capitiformicae =

Scientific classification
- Domain: Bacteria
- Kingdom: Bacillati
- Phylum: Actinomycetota
- Class: Actinomycetia
- Order: Streptomycetales
- Family: Streptomycetaceae
- Genus: Streptomyces
- Species: S. capitiformicae

Binomial name
- Streptomyces capitiformicae Jiang et al. 2018

Type strain
- CGMCC 4.7403, DSM 104537, 1H-SSA4

Species of bacterium

Streptomyces capitiformicae is a bacterium species from the genus of Streptomyces which has been isolated from the head of the ant Camponotus japonicus. Streptomyces capitiformicae produces angucyclinone-antibiotics.

== See also ==
- List of Streptomyces species
