= Streptomyces camponoticapitis =

Scientific classification
- Domain: Bacteria
- Kingdom: Bacillati
- Phylum: Actinomycetota
- Class: Actinomycetia
- Order: Streptomycetales
- Family: Streptomycetaceae
- Genus: Streptomyces
- Species: S. camponoticapitis

Binomial name
- Streptomyces camponoticapitis Li et al. 2016

Type strain
- CGMCC 4.7275, DSM 100523, 2H-TWYE14

Species of bacterium

Streptomyces camponoticapitis is a bacterium species from the genus of Streptomyces which has been isolated from the head of the ant Camponotus japonicus in Harbin in China.

== See also ==
- List of Streptomyces species
