= Streptomyces amphotericinicus =

Scientific classification
- Domain: Bacteria
- Kingdom: Bacillati
- Phylum: Actinomycetota
- Class: Actinomycetia
- Order: Streptomycetales
- Family: Streptomycetaceae
- Genus: Streptomyces
- Species: S. amphotericinicus

Binomial name
- Streptomyces amphotericinicus Cao et al. 2017

Type strain
- CGMCC 4.7350, DSM 103128, 1H-SSA8

Species of bacterium

Streptomyces amphotericinicus is a bacterium species from the genus of Streptomyces which has been isolated from the head of the ant Camponotus japonicus. Streptomyces amphotericinicus produces amphotericin.

== See also ==
- List of Streptomyces species
