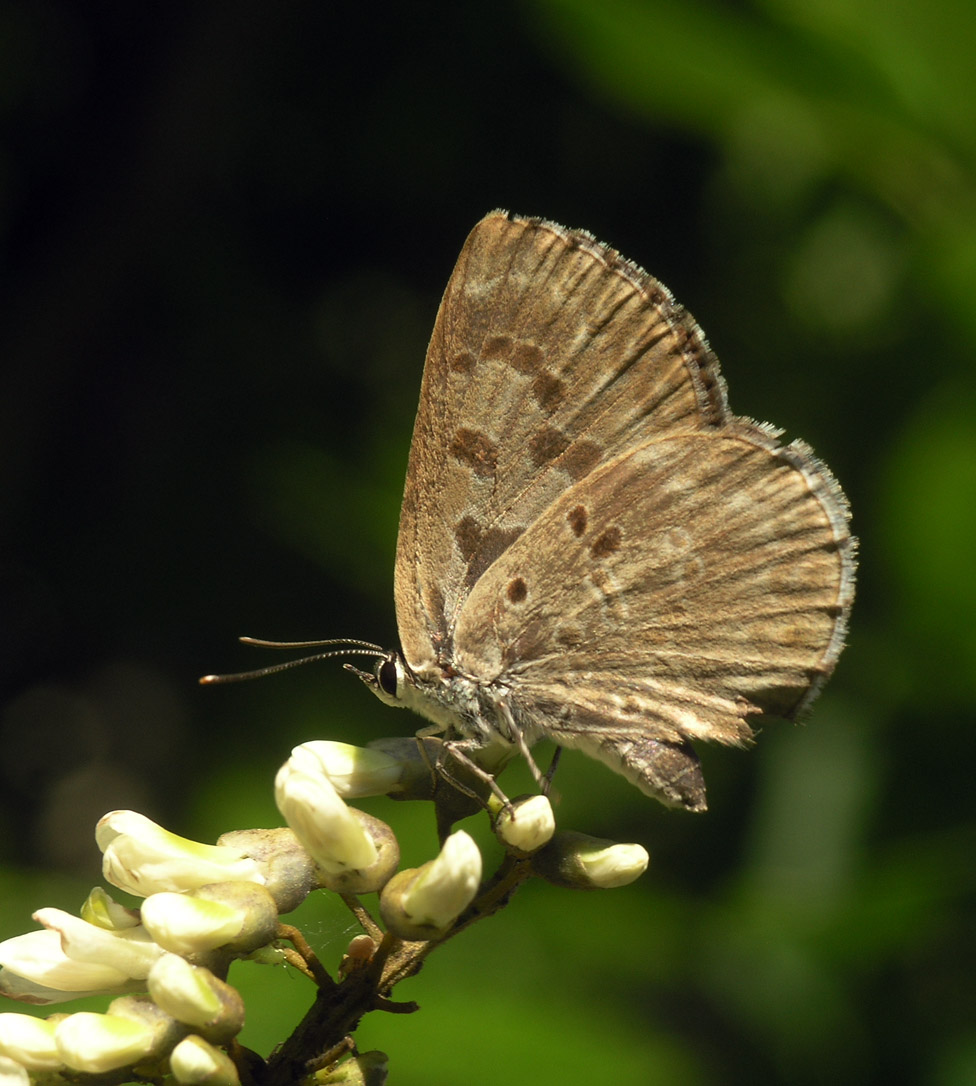
- Female

Scientific classification
- Kingdom: Animalia
- Phylum: Arthropoda
- Clade: Pancrustacea
- Class: Insecta
- Order: Lepidoptera
- Family: Lycaenidae
- Genus: Niphanda
- Species: N. fusca

Binomial name
- Niphanda fusca (Bremer & Grey, 1853)

Synonyms
- Thecla fusca Bremer & Grey, 1853; Amblypodia dispar Bremer, 1864; Thecla lasurea Graeser, 1888

= Niphanda fusca =

Species of butterfly

Niphanda fusca is a parasitic butterfly primarily found in East Asian countries such as Japan and Korea. It is a "cuckoo-type" parasite of the ant Camponotus japonicus. It utilizes chemical mimicry to trick the host worker ants into adopting it while it is a third-instar caterpillar. From there, it is fed mouth-to-mouth by the worker ants as though it were one of their own young.

The butterflies of this species differ in color between the male and the female. The male has more of a purple tint with a gray underwing.

N. fusca is currently an endangered butterfly, with an alarming and rapid decrease in numbers. Many locations that have previously recorded sightings have now become areas where the butterfly is extinct. These changes, which have come about mostly in the past 40 years, have resulted from habitat changes moving away from preferred early stage succession ecosystems, as well as habitat changes due to urban development.

== Description ==
The butterfly has broad spotted wings, with larger and more pronounced patterns in the forewings. It is a beige-gray color, while its spotted patterns are a darker brown. The male butterfly has been observed to have a gray underwing.

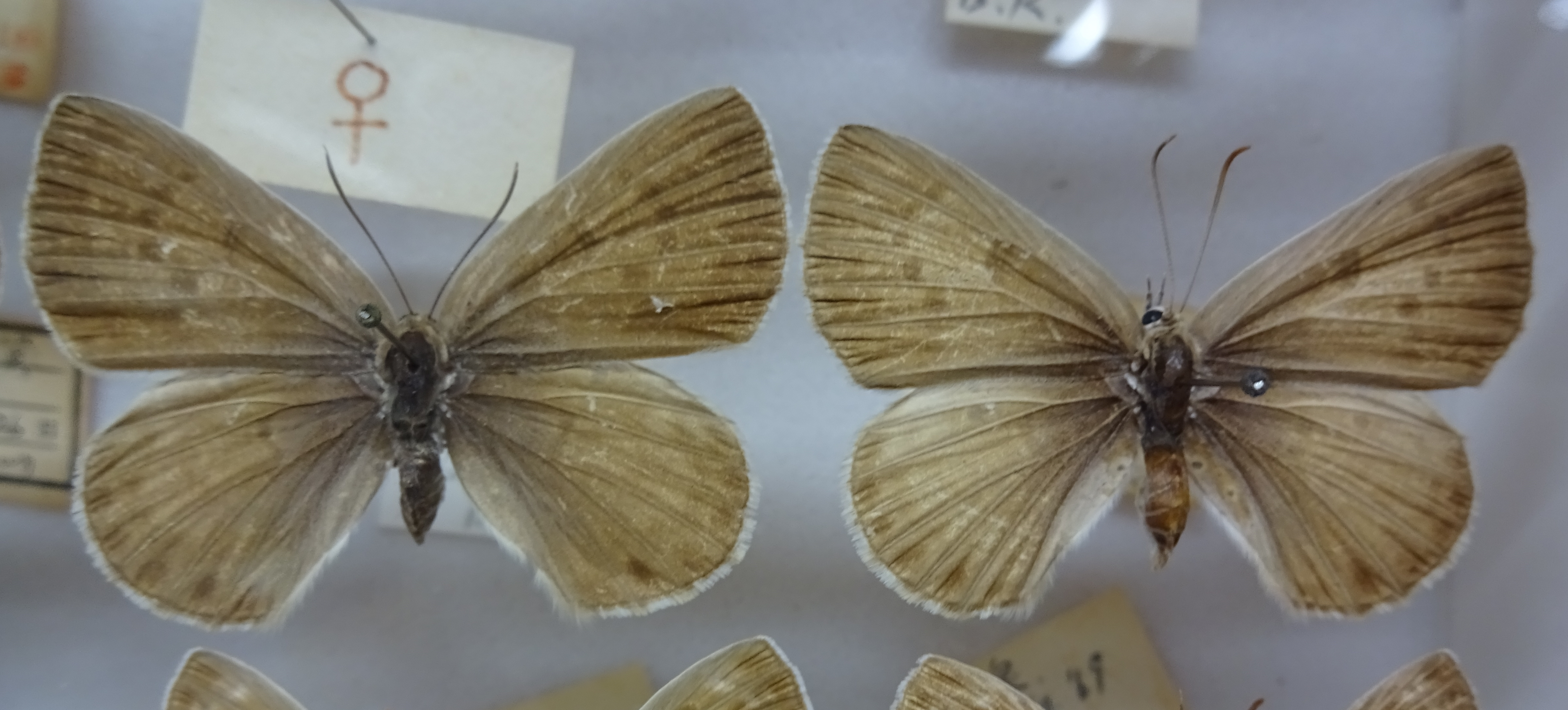

== Habitat ==
N. fusca adults typically inhabit open habitats, such as grasslands, open woodlands, meadows, and bushes. They have also been found to inhabit semi-bare areas, or areas characteristic of early stages of succession, such as cliffs or grasslands near volcanoes.

Due to its heavy dependence on C. japonicus, the habitat of N. fusca is limited by the habitat preferences of its host ant. C. japonicus prefers sunny areas to nest, and so N. fusca is likewise limited. The butterfly larvae need a sufficient number of aphids in order to survive, as they feed on these aphids upon birth – therefore not all places inhabited by C. japonicus are suitable for N. fusca.

== Home range ==
Most of N. fusca's early life stages are limited to the C. japonicus nest. Oviposition takes place near the honeydew-producing aphids that the host ant tends to, and the newly hatched young will feed on the excretions of the aphids. Once the caterpillar has grown to a third-instar larva, it will be taken into the C. japonicus nest where it stays for 10 months until pupation at the entrance of the nest. Egg laying occurs several months later.

== Host plant ==
Unlike most butterflies, N. fusca does not feed nor depend on host plants, but rather feeds on the excretions of aphids and, later, on the regurgitation of C. japonicus. As a result, there are no specific plants that the female butterfly will choose to oviposit on, but rather she will seek out plants and trees near C. japonicus nests and aphid colonies to ensure a food source for her offspring. One plant that has been used in laboratory experiments is Japanese pampas grass.

== Food resources ==
=== Caterpillar ===
As first-instar and occasionally second-instar larva, the caterpillars will feed on the honeydew-like excretions produced by the aphids. In laboratory experiments, these aphids have been found feeding on Japanese pampas grass, Miscanthus sinensis. These aphids are also tended to by N. fusca's host ant, C. japonicus. This stands in contrast to most other parasitic butterflies, which typically feed on plants.

The caterpillars are adopted in the C. japonicas nest occasionally as second-instar larva and typically as third. They feed on the regurgitation of the ant, and are wholly dependent on their host ant for survival – this parasitism is thus a species-specific, obligate interaction.

== Parental care ==
=== Oviposition ===
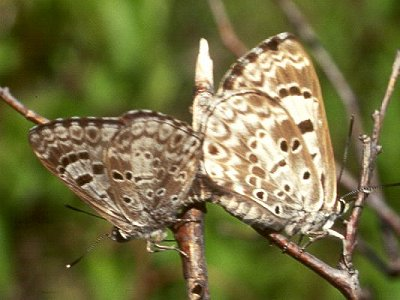
Copulation.

The female N. fusca will oviposit her eggs on a tree near aphid colonies, typically in small bunches. This is strategically placed so the newborn caterpillars will have an immediate source of food and are proximal to the host ants that will later adopt them. The offspring are almost ensured a food source as first instar larvae through the aphids until they pupate as the ants continue to feed them. N. fusca is univoltine, meaning the female will only lay one small brood of offspring per year.

== Life cycle ==
=== Eggs ===
Oviposition occurs near aphid colonies, as the newborn caterpillars will later feed on the honeydew-like excretions of the aphids. Eggs are laid in small bunches once a year.

=== Larvae ===
Once the caterpillars hatch, they feed on the honeydew produced by the aphids until they are second- or third-instar larva. These aphids are tended to by the host ant, C. japonicus, thus allowing the caterpillars to be near the ants they will soon parasitize.

As the caterpillars become third-instar larva, they will develop the exocrine glands that are essential in producing the chemicals that aid in parasitizing C. japonicus. These organs include tentacle organs and a dorsal nectary organ (DNO). Third-instar caterpillars are most likely to be adopted by host C. japonicus workers, where they are then fed and raised by the host ants until they are ready for pupation. Adoption typically occurs in the summer.

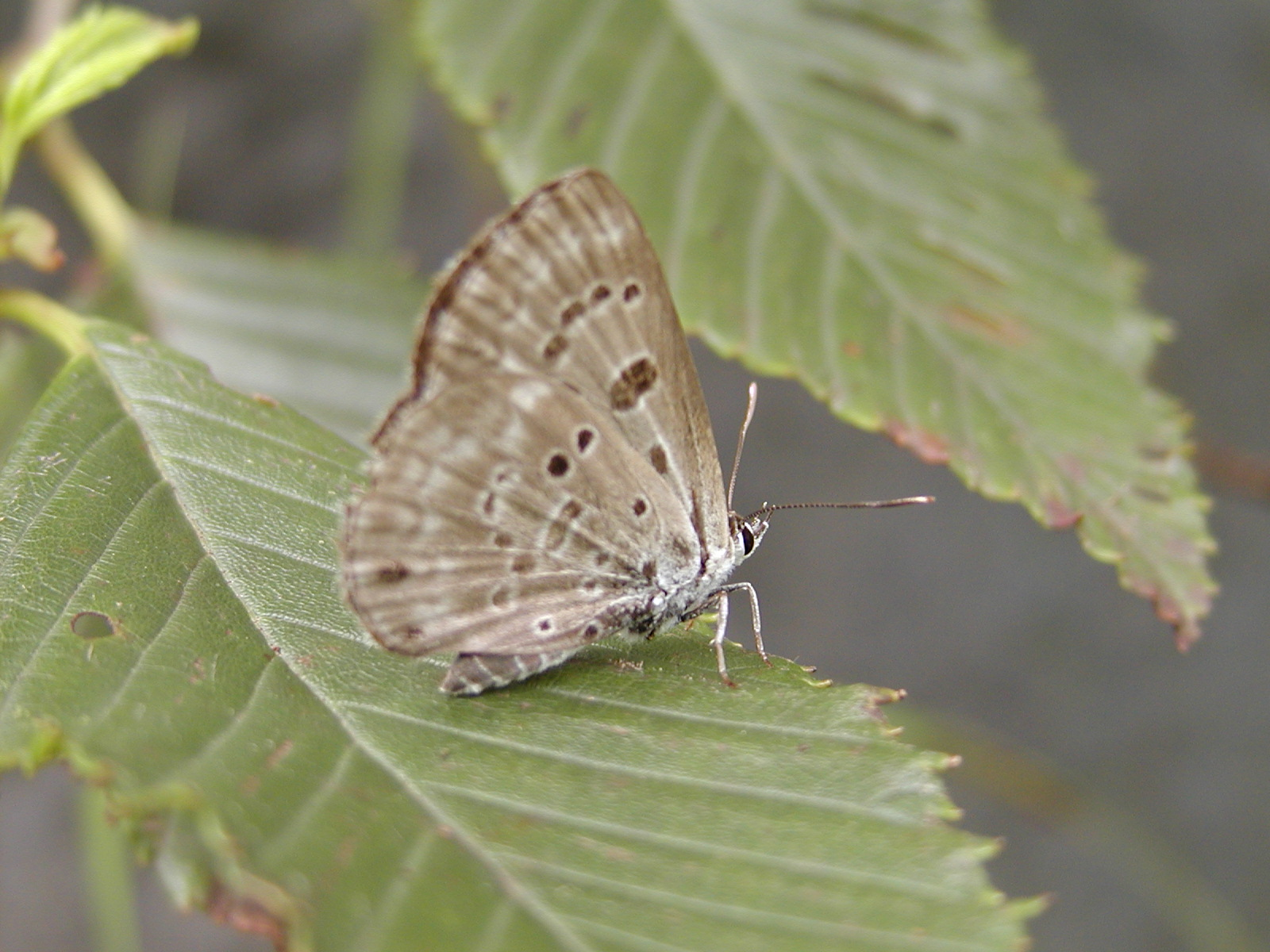
Female

=== Pupae ===
Pupation occurs in the late spring, around 10 months after adoption as a third instar by the host ant. It occurs after hibernation in the winter, which also occurs within the nest of the ant. After hibernation, the larva will relocate to the edge of the C. japonicus nest where it will then form a cocoon.

=== Adults ===
N. fusca will eclose also in the late spring, around two weeks after pupation – it is a late season emergent insect.

== Parasitism ==
=== Host ===
N. fusca is most commonly studied for its obligate parasitism with its host ant, C. japonicus. The host worker ant will adopt the third-instar larva, where the caterpillar will then live and be raised for another 10 months. They develop for the rest of their larval stage within the nests of C. japonicus, and will choose to pupate at the entrance of the ant nest. Despite the apparent size difference between the butterfly and ant larva, the ant workers will care for the caterpillars as often as their own kin.

The interaction is a "cuckoo-type" parasitism, in which the caterpillars are directly fed, mouth-to-mouth, by the host ant. They are fed regurgitations from the adult ants, a mechanism called trophallaxis. In this manner, N. fusca are completely dependent on the adult ants for their food.

=== Mechanisms of overcoming host ===
N. fusca will use chemical mimicry through the production and release of cuticular hydrocarbons (CHCs) to trick the host ant into adopting the larva as their own. CHCs are typically used to communicate information on insect caste, colony, age, and more. The CHCs, secreted by the DNO (an endocrine gland of N. fusca), have a major sugar component of trehalose (as opposed to the commonly thought glucose).

The CHCs produced change after the caterpillar is adopted, likely evidence that the caterpillar learns and readjusts its production to more appropriately represent the odor of the worker ants it regularly comes in contact with. This is supported by a further discovery that the CHCs of the butterfly larva more closely resemble the CHC of the adult male ant rather than the CHC of the ant larva.

The CHCs aid the caterpillars in avoiding ant aggression by allowing them to mimic colony-specific information production.

== Protective coloration and behavior ==
=== Chemical mimicry ===
A major mechanism that allows N. fusca to be adopted into the host ant colony is the chemical mimicry that it employs. Not only does this allow the butterfly to gain entry into this colony, thus supplying it with 10 months of mouth-to-mouth nutrients and care, but it also allows it to convey false information on colony and identity to match that of the adult male ant. The caterpillar can thus proceed to live in the colony for months not only without agitation from the host ant, but also almost equal nurture from the host ant as it provides towards its own kin larva. The CHCs, or the chemicals that the caterpillar uses, are adapted to more closely mimic those of the adult male worker.

== Physiology ==
=== Chemical production ===
In addition to chemical mimicry, the secretion of the caterpillar also appeals to the taste preferences of C. japonicus. The secretion, primarily composed of tetrahelose, is made from the DNO, an endocrine gland, while the caterpillar is a third-instar larva. The chemicals are also composed of amino acids that are considered an important source of nitrogen for the host ants.

These chemical productions are constantly modified to regularly appeal to the host ant – these appeasement substances may be evolutionarily stable while the parasite continues to be rare and small in population size.

== Mutualism ==
While there is definitely a greater benefit to the butterfly in this "cuckoo-type" interaction, it has been indicated that there may be mutualism involved, especially in regards to the chemical secretions of N. fusca. The sugar, tetrahelose, could be seen as a reward for the host ants in return for raising and feeding the larva, as the ants prefer to feed on the secretions that have a greater concentration of tetrahelose. The amino acids in this appeasement substance could be seen as an important and rich source of nitrogen for the host ant.

== Conservation ==
=== Habitat loss ===
N. fusca is listed in the Japan Red List as endangered – only 27 of 44 listed prefectures with records of the butterfly currently have maintained their records, showing a 39% decrease. Most of the decline has occurred in the past 40 years, from 1980s to the present. It is one of the four species that have disappeared in Shikoku.

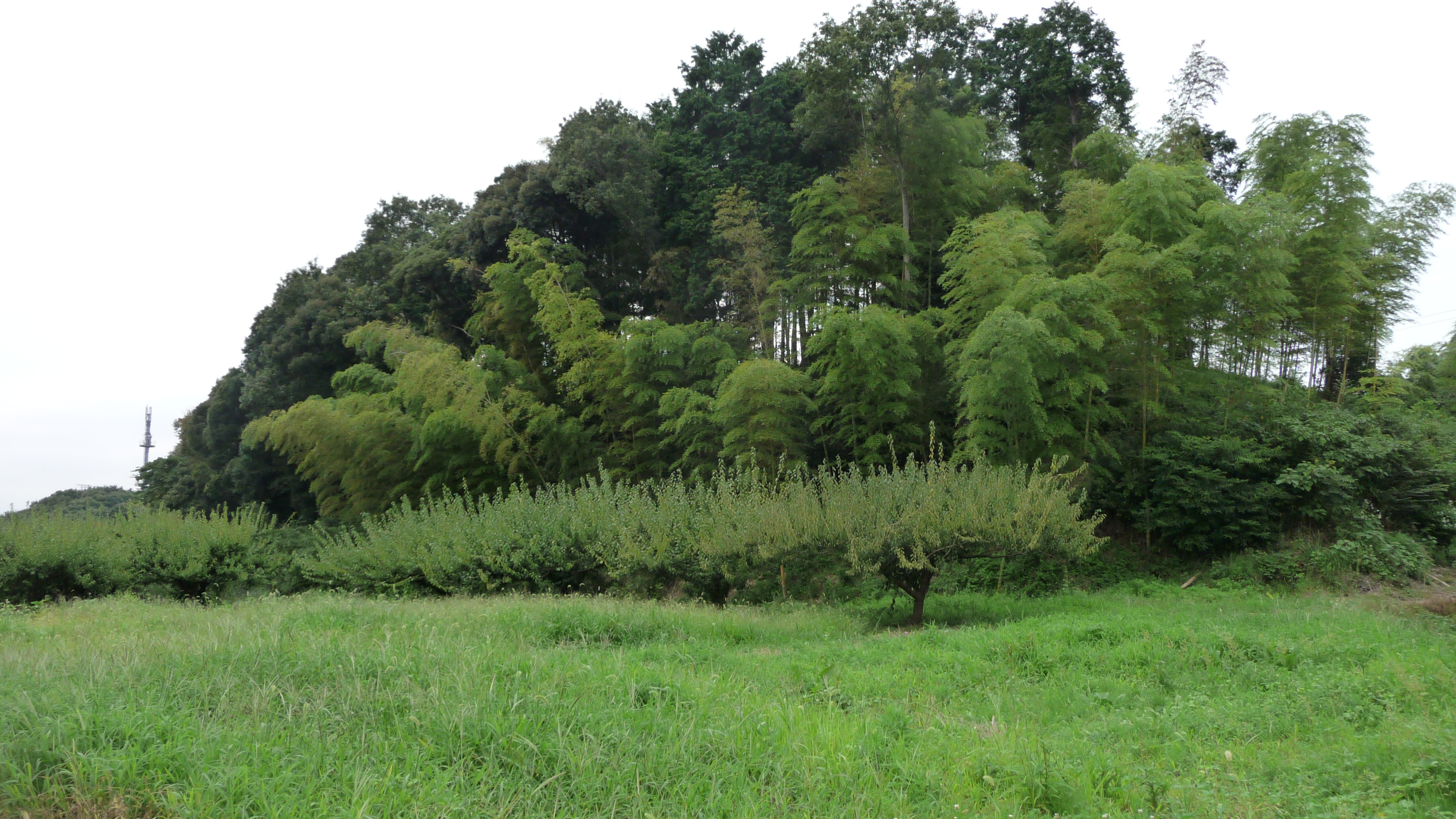
Satoyama, utilize plant layer.

Two main causes are listed for leading to N. fusca's decline in numbers and thus endangerment: degradation of satoyama ecosystems and urban development. Because one of the few places the butterfly can inhabit are early stages of succession, these habitats must be maintained in such a state in order to prevent the progression into later stages and thus the loss of a habitat for the butterflies. Many of the satoyama have either been destroyed or have progressed into becoming forests due to lack of management – this has been increasingly the case for the last 30–40 years.

Another cause is the urban development. Not only has this led to decreased value of the satoyama (leading then to its abandonment), but this has also led to the destruction of certain natural lands to make way for urban development. While early stage succession may be harder and more expensive to maintain, the preservation of other more stable lands, such as cliffs or grasslands near volcanoes, would be more feasible of a conservation effort.

A similar decline can also be seen in South Korea, where they have not been observed since 1999.
