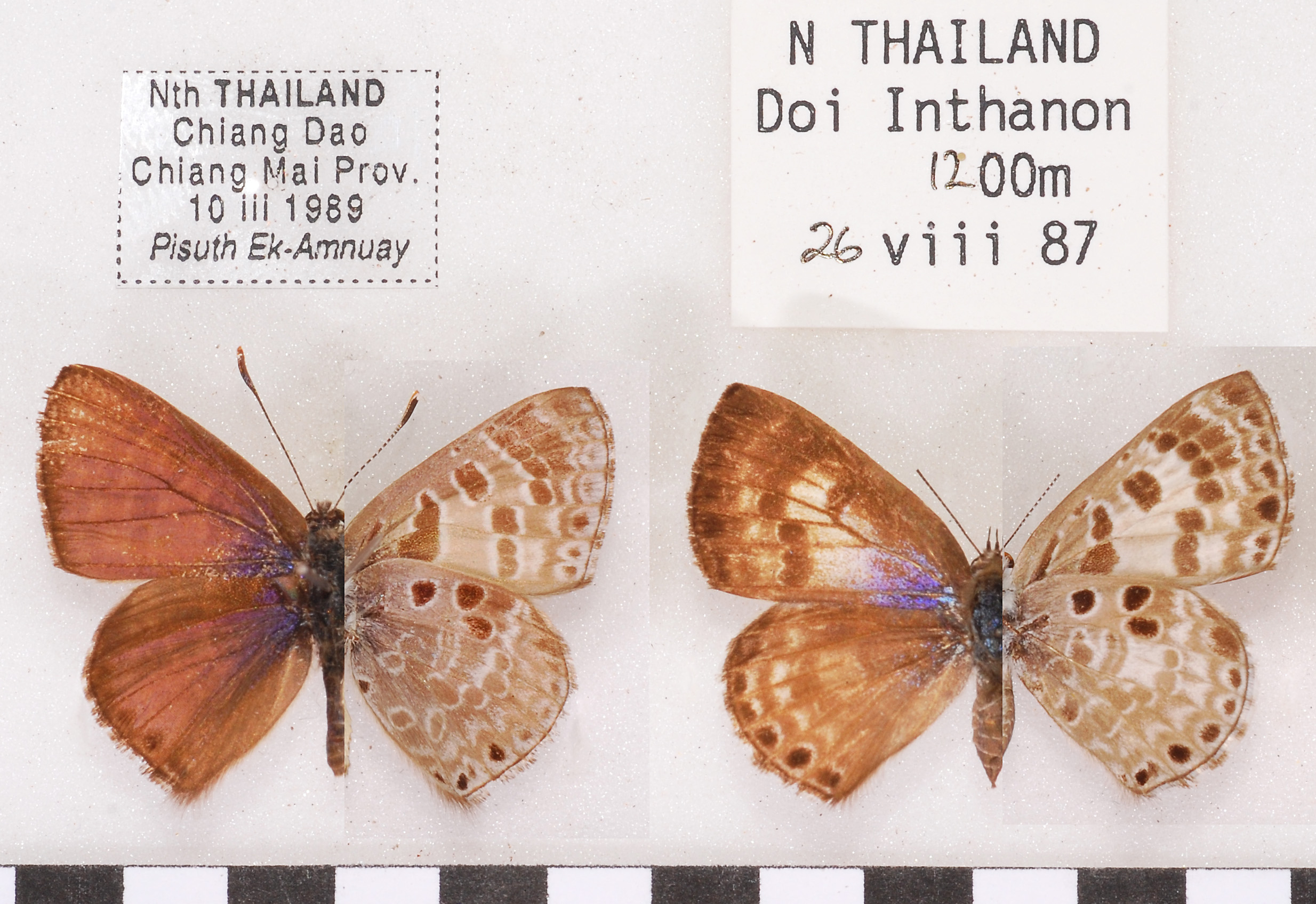

Scientific classification
- Domain: Eukaryota
- Kingdom: Animalia
- Phylum: Arthropoda
- Class: Insecta
- Order: Lepidoptera
- Family: Lycaenidae
- Genus: Niphanda
- Species: N. asialis

Binomial name
- Niphanda asialis (de Nicéville, 1895)

Synonyms
- Azanus asialis de Nicéville, 1895; Lycaena (Niphanda) marcia Fawcett, 1904; Niphanda cyme Fruhstorfer, 1919; Lycaena (Niphanda) marcia Fawcett, 1904; Niphanda onoma Fruhstorfer, 1919

= Niphanda asialis =

Species of butterfly

Niphanda asialis or White-banded Pierrot is a butterfly in the family Lycaenidae. It was described by Lionel de Nicéville in 1895. It is found in the Indomalayan realm.

== Subspecies ==
- Niphanda asialis asialis (Sumatra, possibly Nias)
- Niphanda asialis cyme Fruhstorfer, 1919 (Java)
- Niphanda asialis marcia (Fawcett, 1904) (India to Peninsular Malaysia, southern Yunnan)
- Niphanda asialis onoma Fruhstorfer, 1919 (Sumatra)
