= Satoyama Initiative =

Global conservationist initiative

The Satoyama Initiative is a global initiative based on the concept of Satoyama — a traditional rural landscape in Japan. The initiative encourages the integration of conservation and the sustainable use of biodiversity in production landscapes, outside of protected areas. The initiative has been supported and implemented by an international partnership of over 100 governments, civil society organizations, and indigenous people.

== Name ==
The name "Satoyama" comes from a Japanese term for landscapes subject to human production activities. Examples are agriculture, forestry & Animal husbandry, and natural habitats, where human influence is an essential aspect of the local ecosystem. The Satoyama Initiative is based on the principle that these landscapes, when properly managed, can benefit both biodiversity and human livelihoods, rather than these being in a state of opposition, thus leading to "society in harmony with nature".

The "satoyama" landscape per se is limited to a model landscape found in Japan, while landscapes with similar features are found in countries around the world. To avoid referring to landscapes around the world by an inappropriate Japanese term, documentation used in the context of the Satoyama Initiative uses the term "socio-ecological production landscapes and seascapes (SEPLS)" to refer to all such landscapes, including Japanese satoyama.

== History ==
There has been opposition to the use of the word "Satoyama" since it is only used in Japanese and is not a common term throughout the world, and from some major agricultural exporting countries who "made the criticism that the Satoyama Initiative would augment local production for local consumption, and thus inhibit free trade in goods in the spirit of the GATT Uruguay Round" before it was finally included in the COP 10 decision.

== International Partnership for the Satoyama Initiative (IPSI) ==
The International Partnership for the Satoyama Initiative (IPSI), one of the major institutional components under the Satoyama Initiative, is a partnership established on 19 October 2010 "to promote the activities identified by the Satoyama Initiative". By 2014, the partnership had grown from its original 51 member organizations to more than 160, including national and local governmental organizations, non-governmental and civil society organizations, indigenous and local community organizations, academic, educational, and research institutions, private-sector and industry organizations, United Nations and other international organizations, and others. IPSI holds annual Global Conferences and other events, sponsors collaborative activities carried out by its members, collect case studies of work done in production landscapes and seascapes, and promotes knowledge facilitation and research.

IPSI's Secretariat is hosted by UNU-IAS in Tokyo, which conducts research on various issues related to the Satoyama Initiative — in particular through its International Satoyama Initiative research project.

== See also ==
- Landscape
- Convention on Biological Diversity
