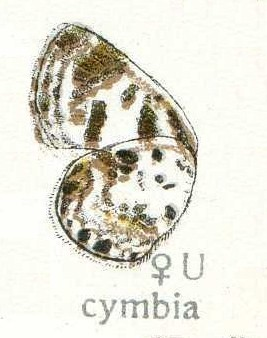
- Underside of female, from Adalbert Seitz

Scientific classification
- Domain: Eukaryota
- Kingdom: Animalia
- Phylum: Arthropoda
- Class: Insecta
- Order: Lepidoptera
- Family: Lycaenidae
- Genus: Niphanda
- Species: N. cymbia

Binomial name
- Niphanda cymbia de Nicéville 1884

= Niphanda cymbia =

Pointed Pierrot

Species of butterfly

Niphanda cymbia, the pointed Pierrot, is a small butterfly found in northern India (Sikkim to Assam), Burma and northern Borneo (N. c. reter Druce, 1895) that belongs to the lycaenids or blues family.

== Description ==
Male upperside: violet with a brilliant effulgence (brightness) in fresh specimens, forewing: costa and termen narrowly edged with dark brown, a dark brown transverse short streak also on the discocellulars. Hindwing: costa, termen and discocellulars marked as in the forewing, but the dark brown edging slightly broader, on the termen it is produced obscurely inwards in the posterior interspaces; dorsum somewhat broadly dusky brown. Underside: dull whitish, forewing: basal half of costa shaded with brown; a streak from base between vein 12 and the subcostal vein, an inwardly oblique, very broad, lunular subbasal spot, a spot on the discocellulars, a transverse discal band, a transverse subterminal series of inwardly conical spots and a slender anteciliary line, dark brown; the transverse discal band is maculate (blurred) and broken, its anterior portion to vein 3 outwardly oblique, its posterior portion below vein 3 shifted well inwards and nearly vertical; the costa above vein 12, a postdiscal transverse irregular cloud very broad anteriorly, narrow and faint posteriorly, and a transverse inner subterminal lunular line, pale brown. Hindwing: the humeral edge of the precostal area, two or three basal spots, a transverse subbasal line of four spots, a transverse spot on the discocellulars, with above it in vertical order two coalescent spots, a transverse curved macular discal band, an inner, subterminal, lunular, continuous broad band, a subterminal series of spots and an anteciliary line, brown; the basal and subbasal markings, the anterior of the two spots above the discocellular spot, and the posterior four subterminal spots very dark brown, almost black. The discal band has on either side of it posterior shorter macular bands, that give it an irregular and ill-defined appearance, while the two spots nearest the costa of the inner markings are very large and prominent. Cilia of both forewings and hindwings brown. Antennae, head, thorax and abdomen brown, the thorax slightly purplish in fresh specimens, the shafts of the antennae ringed with white; beneath: palpi, thorax and abdomen dingy brownish white.

Female upperside: brown. Forewing: the costal and terminal margins, and the area below the basal half of the cell of a darker brown than the ground colour; an irregular transverse posterior discal series of dark brown spots, between which and the dark basal area on the inner side and between it and the broad dark terminal band on the outer side the ground colour is replaced by dingy white. Hindwing: a postdiscal series of white spots, and a subterminal series of inwardly conical very dark brown spots, the posterior spots of which are edged narrowly both on the inner and outer sides with white. Both forewings and hindwings with slender black anteciliary lines. Underside: ground colour a purer white than in the male; markings similar but all narrower and more clearly defined. Antennae, head, thorax and abdomen brown, of a paler shade than in the male the thorax not purplish; beneath: palpi, thorax and abdomen white.

== See also ==
- List of butterflies of India (Lycaenidae)
