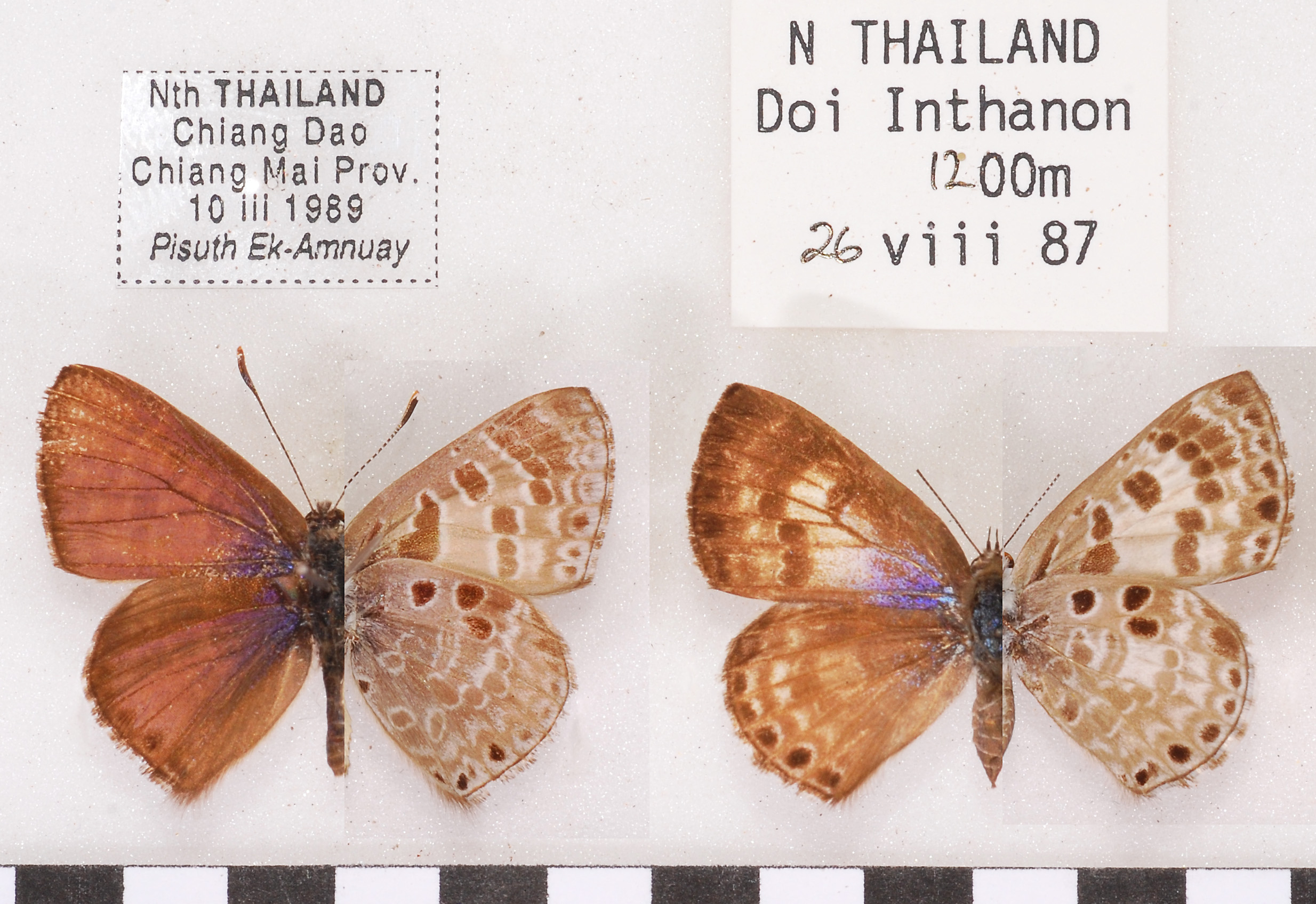
- Niphanda asialis Thailand

Scientific classification
- Domain: Eukaryota
- Kingdom: Animalia
- Phylum: Arthropoda
- Class: Insecta
- Order: Lepidoptera
- Family: Lycaenidae
- Subfamily: Polyommatinae
- Tribe: Niphandini; Eliot, 1973
- Genus: Niphanda; Moore, [1875]

= Niphanda =

Butterfly genus in family Lycaenidae

Niphanda is a genus of butterflies in the family Lycaenidae and only member of the Niphandini tribe. The members (species) of this genus are found in the Indomalayan realm and the Palearctic realm. The genus was erected by Frederic Moore in 1875.

== Species ==
- Niphanda asialis (de Nicéville, 1895) India to Peninsular Malaya, South Yunnan, Sumatra, Java
- Niphanda cymbia de Nicéville, [1884]
- Niphanda fusca (Bremer & Grey, 1853) Amur, Ussuri, Transbaikalia, NorthEast China, Japan
- Niphanda stubbsi Howarth, 1956 Peninsular Malaya.
- Niphanda tessellata Moore, [1875] Burma, Thailand, Malay Peninsula, Sundaland, Philippines
- Niphanda anthenoides Okubo, 2007 Philippines (Mindanao)
