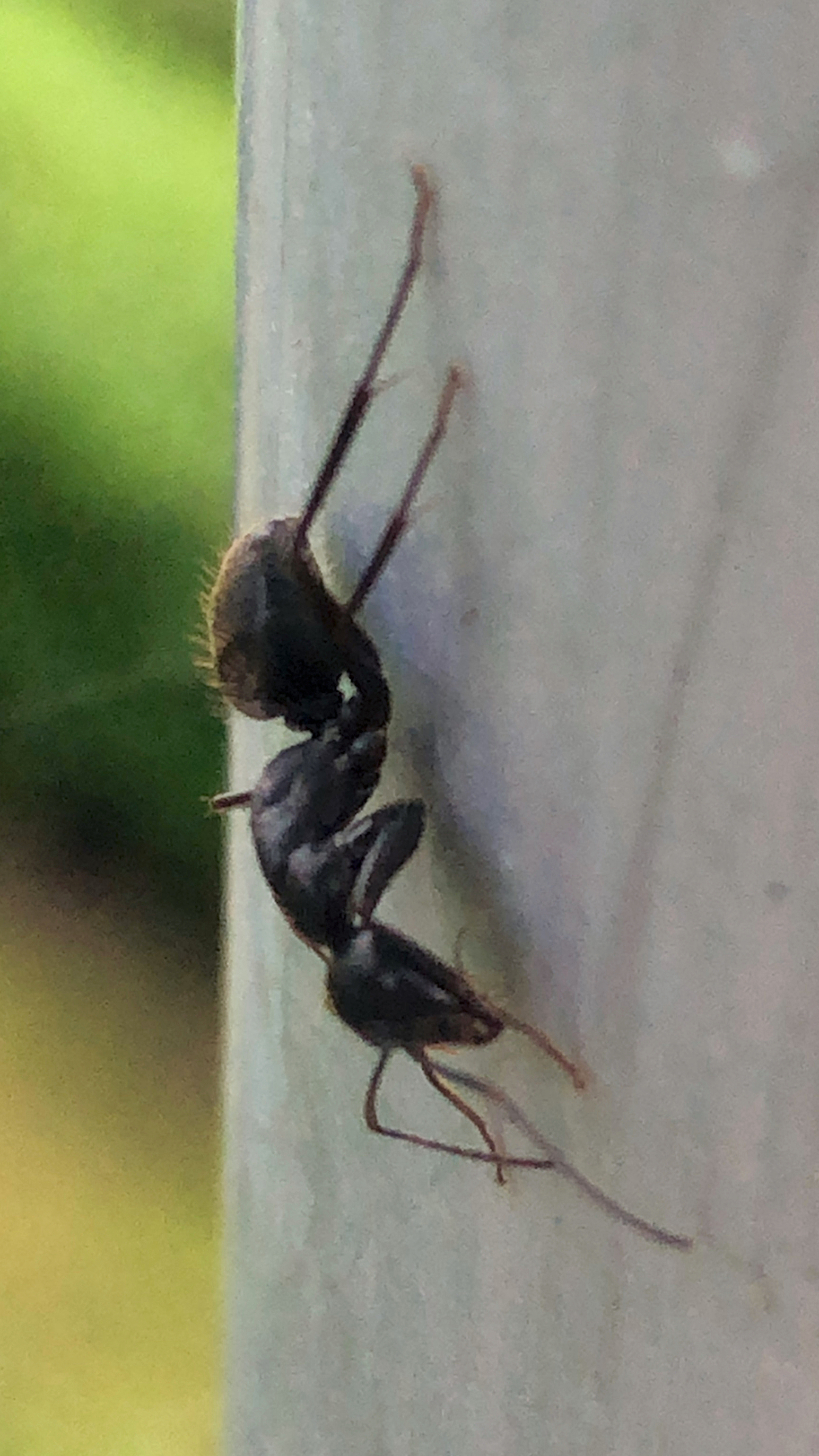

Scientific classification
- Kingdom: Animalia
- Phylum: Arthropoda
- Clade: Pancrustacea
- Class: Insecta
- Order: Hymenoptera
- Family: Formicidae
- Subfamily: Formicinae
- Genus: Camponotus
- Subgenus: Camponotus
- Species: C. japonicus

Binomial name
- Camponotus japonicus Mayr, 1866

= Camponotus japonicus =

Species known as the Japanese carpenter ant

Camponotus japonicus, commonly known as the Japanese carpenter ant, is a species of ant native to eastern Asia. It is black, and one of the largest ants. A nest has about ten to thousands of individuals, and it can be a pest when it enters households or protects aphids. There are several subspecies of this ant in different areas of Asia, with the largest of the species being located in northern China.

== Appearance ==
The queen is black but has microscopic brown hair protruding from the thorax and abdomen. They are 17 millimeters long. Before mating, the queen has four transparent brown wings supported by brown veins. The 12-millimeter-long male has a longer and straighter antennae and a slimmer body. Unlike the workers, both the queen and the male have three ocelli.

The workers are divided into three subcastes based on their size, which varies from 6 to 15 millimeters. The largest subcaste of workers is also called the soldier.

== Sensilla ==
The ant has sensilla, which can recognize CHC-mixtures from non-nestmates, to which it can be aggressive.

== Range ==
Camponotus japonicus inhabits a wide range, including Japan, Korea, Pakistan, Iran, the Philippines, China, Mongolia and Russia (Siberia). It was first identified in India in the state of Arunachal Pradesh in the Tawang district near Kitpi Lake, at an elevation of 1700 meters.

== Parasitism ==
This ant serves as a host species for the parasite, Niphanda fusca. The butterfly species will release cuticular hydrocarbons (CHCs) that mimic the CHC of the adult male ant. The ant will then adopt the third instar larva of N. fusca into its nest, feed it mouth-to-mouth, and raise it on its own. This behavior is an example of brood parasitism and obligate parasitism.

It hosts Polyrhachis lamellidens as a parasite too.
