= Saphenamycin =

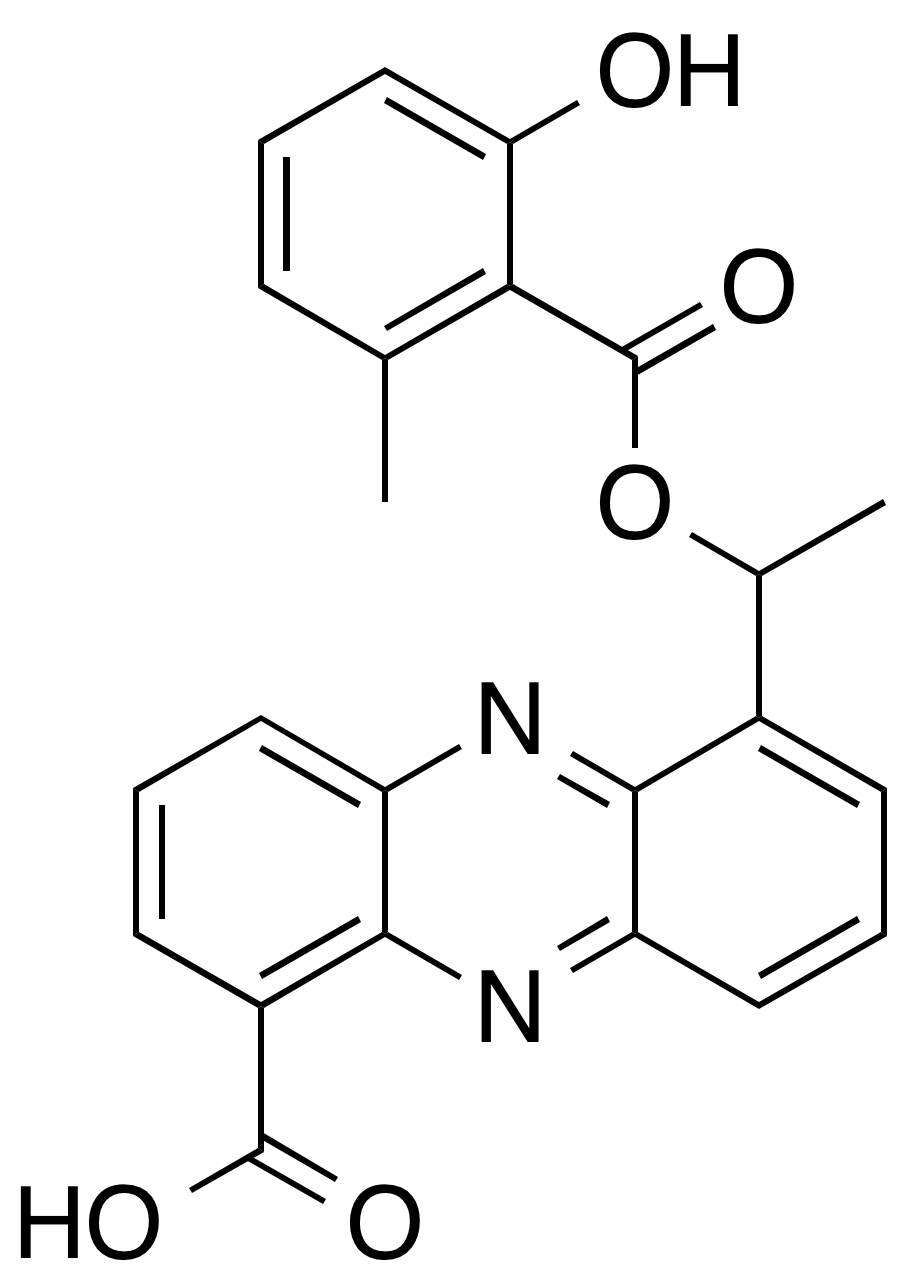

Names
- IUPAC name 6-[1-(2-Hydroxy-6-methylbenzoyl)oxyethyl]phenazine-1-carboxylic acid
- Other names (+/-)-Saphenamycin

Identifiers
CAS Number	racemic: 634600-55-8; natural: 83198-27-0
3D model (JSmol)	racemic: Interactive image; natural: Interactive image
ChEBI	racemic: CHEBI:32119
ChemSpider	racemic: 52085794; 118306
KEGG	racemic: C12311
PubChem CID	racemic: 134184
UNII	racemic: K9X7806V5B; natural: RQF7LKX9N1
CompTox Dashboard (EPA)	racemic: DTXSID301003193
- InChI: racemic: InChI=1S/C23H18N2O5/c1-12-6-3-11-18(26)19(12)23(29)30-13(2)14-7-4-9-16-20(14)24-17-10-5-8-15(22(27)28)21(17)25-16/h3-11,13,26H,1-2H3,(H,27,28) Key: AXHGAUSFRHOIGV-UHFFFAOYSA-N; natural: InChI=1S/C23H18N2O5/c1-12-6-3-11-18(26)19(12)23(29)30-13(2)14-7-4-9-16-20(14)24-17-10-5-8-15(22(27)28)21(17)25-16/h3-11,13,26H,1-2H3,(H,27,28)/t13-/m1/s1 Key: AXHGAUSFRHOIGV-CYBMUJFWSA-N
- SMILES: racemic: CC1=C(C(=CC=C1)O)C(=O)OC(C)C2=CC=CC3=NC4=C(C=CC=C4N=C32)C(=O)O; natural: C[C@@H](OC(=O)c1c(C)cccc1O)c2cccc3nc4c(cccc4nc23)C(=O)O

Properties
Chemical formula	C_{23}H_{18}N_{2}O_{5}
Molar mass	402.406 g·mol^{−1}
- Except where otherwise noted, data are given for materials in their standard state (at 25 °C [77 °F], 100 kPa). Infobox references

Saphenamycin is an antibiotic with the molecular formula C_{23}H_{18}N_{2}O_{5} which is produced by the bacterium Streptomyces canarius and other Streptomyces species.
