= Streptomyces canarius =

Scientific classification
- Domain: Bacteria
- Kingdom: Bacillati
- Phylum: Actinomycetota
- Class: Actinomycetia
- Order: Streptomycetales
- Family: Streptomycetaceae
- Genus: Streptomyces
- Species: S. canarius

Binomial name
- Streptomyces canarius Vavra and Dietz 1965

Type strain
- AS 4.1581, ATCC 27423, BCRC 11621, CBS 732.72, CCRC 11621, CGMCC 4.1581, DSM 40528, HAMBI 1014, IFO 13431, IMET 43539, ISP 5528, JCM 4549, JCM 4733, KCC S-0549, KCC S-0733, KCCS-0549, KCCS-0733, NBRC 13431, NCIMB 9468, NRRL 2976, NRRL-ISP 5528, RIA 1392, UC 2591

Species of bacterium

Streptomyces canarius is a bacterium species from the genus of Streptomyces. Streptomyces canarius produces saphenamycin and canarius.

== See also ==
- List of Streptomyces species
