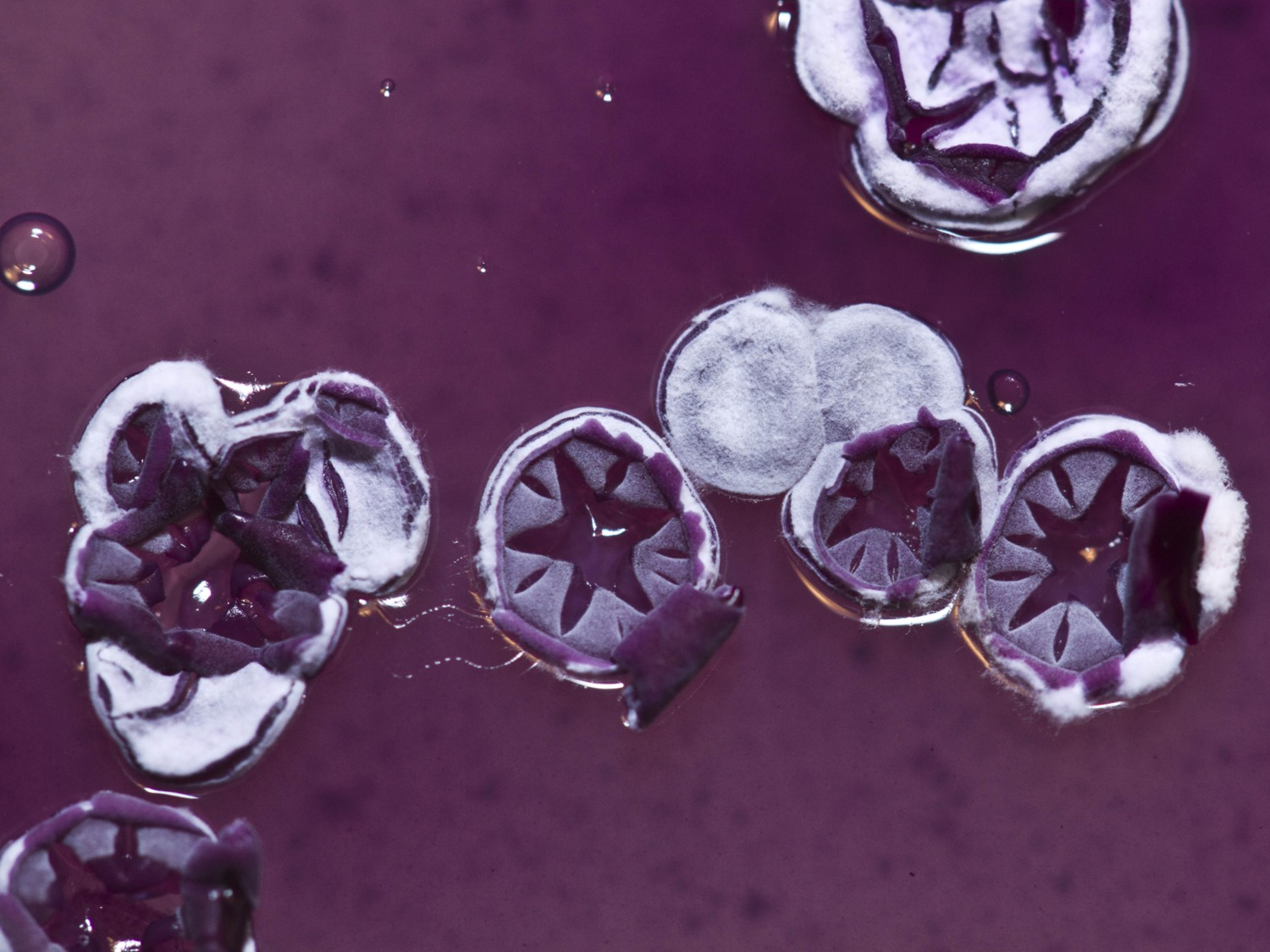
- Streptomyces olivaceus colony

Scientific classification
- Domain: Bacteria
- Kingdom: Bacillati
- Phylum: Actinomycetota
- Class: Actinomycetes
- Order: Streptomycetales
- Family: Streptomycetaceae
- Genus: Streptomyces
- Species: S. olivaceus

Binomial name
- Streptomyces olivaceus Waksman and Henrici 1948

Type strain
- 206, AS 4.1369, ATCC 19794, ATCC 3335, BCRC 11485, BCRC 12491, CBS 281.30, CBS 546.68, CCM 3188, CCRC 11485, CCRC 12491, CCUG 11111, CGMCC 4.1336, CGMCC 4.1369, CGMCC AS 4.1369, CUB 508, DSM 40072, ETH 14308, ETH 9868, IFO 12805, IFO 3200, IMET 40350, IMRU 3335, INA 3200, ISP 5072, JCM 4402, KCC S-0402, Lanoot R-8766, LMG 19394, MTCC 1392, NBIMCC 3385, NBRC 12805, NBRC 3200, NRRL B-1224, NRRL B-3009, NRRL B-B-3009, NRRL-ISP 5072, R-8766, RIA 1073, RIA 481, RIA 519, UNIQEM 180, VKM Ac-254, VTT E-073025, Waksman 3335

Synonyms
- Actinomyces olivaceus

= Streptomyces olivaceus =

Species of bacterium

Granaticin

Streptomyces olivaceus is a bacterium species from the genus of Streptomyces which has been isolated from soil. Streptomyces olivaceus produces granaticin, elloramycin, tetroazolemycin A and tetroazolemycin B. Streptomyces olivaceus can be used to produce vitamin B12.

== See also ==
- List of Streptomyces species
