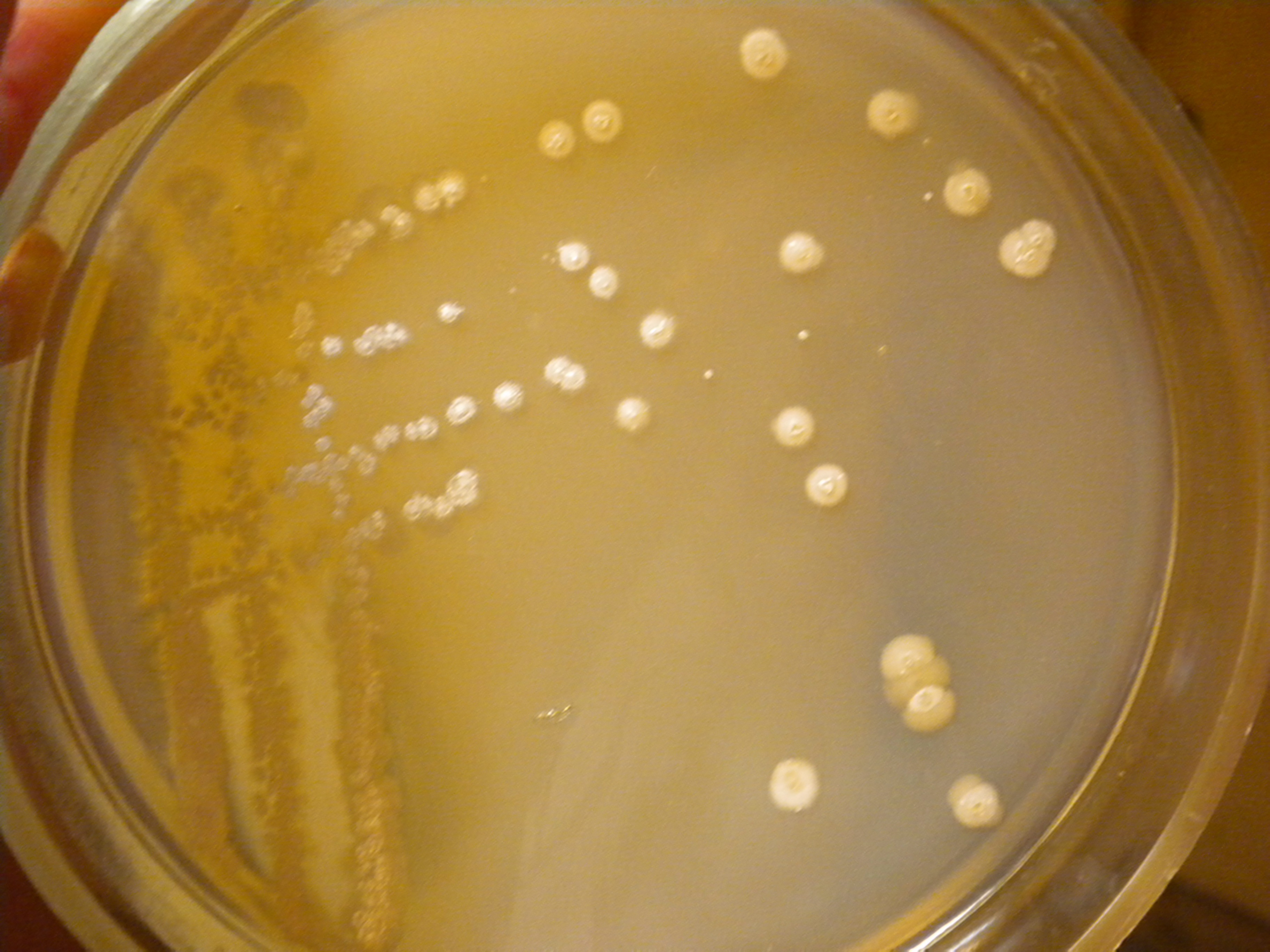
- Streptomyces gardneri strain ChNPU F3

Scientific classification
- Domain: Bacteria
- Kingdom: Bacillati
- Phylum: Actinomycetota
- Class: Actinomycetia
- Order: Streptomycetales
- Family: Streptomycetaceae
- Genus: Streptomyces
- Species: S. gardneri

Binomial name
- Streptomyces gardneri (Waksman 1942) Waksman 1961 (Approved Lists 1980)

Type strain
- ATCC 23911, ATCC 9604, BCRC 12346, BCRC 13687, BCRC 13731, CBS 832.68, CCRC 12346, CCRC 13687, CCRC 13731, CGMCC 4.1210, CGMCC 4.1956, DSM 40064, DSM 43020, ETH 28347, IFO 12865, IFO 13974, IFO 3385, IMET 7182, IMRU 3834, ISP 5064, JCM 3004, JCM 4375, KCC A-0004, KCC S-0375, NBRC 12865, NBRC 13974, NBRC 3385, NCTC 6531, NRRL B-5615, NRRL-ISP 5064, RIA 1117, RIA 634, VKM Ac-1829

Synonyms
- "Nocardia gardneri" (Waksman 1942) Waksman and Henrici 1948; "Proactinomyces gardneri" Waksman 1942

= Streptomyces gardneri =

Species of bacterium

Streptomyces gardneri is a bacterium species from the genus of Streptomyces. Streptomyces gardneri produces thiopeptide A, proactinomycin A, proactinomycin B, proactinomycin C.

== See also ==
- List of Streptomyces species
