= Streptopyrrole =

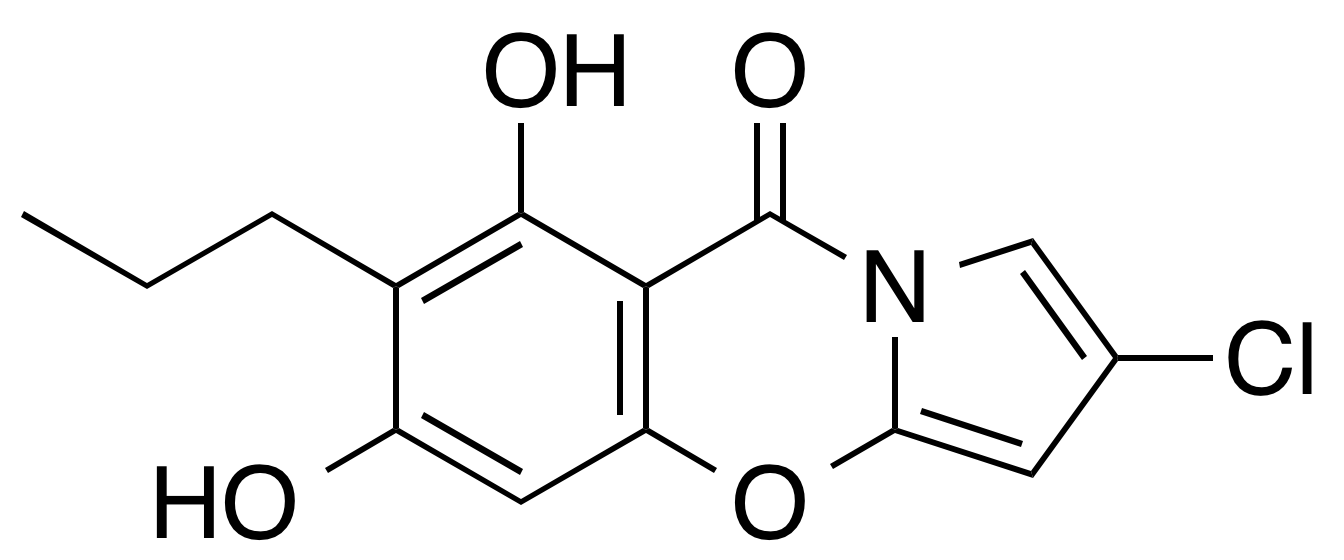

Names
- IUPAC name 2-Chloro-6,8-dihydroxy-7-propylpyrrolo[2,1-b][1,3]benzoxazin-9-one
- Other names Streptopyrrole I

Identifiers
| 3D model (JSmol) | Interactive image |
| ChEBI | CHEBI:203701 |
| ChEMBL | ChEMBL4249987 |
| ChemSpider | 7971884 |
| PubChem CID | 9796118 |
- InChI: InChI=1S/C14H12ClNO4/c1-2-3-8-9(17)5-10-12(13(8)18)14(19)16-6-7(15)4-11(16)20-10/h4-6,17-18H,2-3H2,1H3 Key: AORQLUDOBCRBHX-UHFFFAOYSA-N
- SMILES: CCCC1=C(C2=C(C=C1O)OC3=CC(=CN3C2=O)Cl)O

Properties
| Chemical formula | C_{14}H_{12}ClNO_{4} |
| Molar mass | 293.70 g·mol^{−1} |
- Except where otherwise noted, data are given for materials in their standard state (at 25 °C [77 °F], 100 kPa). Infobox references

Streptopyrrole is an antibiotic with the molecular formula C_{14}H_{12}ClNO_{4} which is produced by the bacterium Streptomyces armeniacus
