= Streptomyces armeniacus =

Scientific classification
- Domain: Bacteria
- Kingdom: Bacillati
- Phylum: Actinomycetota
- Class: Actinomycetia
- Order: Streptomycetales
- Family: Streptomycetaceae
- Genus: Streptomyces
- Species: S. armeniacus

Binomial name
- Streptomyces armeniacus (Kalakoutskii and Kusnetsov 1964) Wellington and Williams 1981

Type strain
- AS 4.1684, ATCC 15676, BCRC 16847, CBS 559.75, CCRC 16847, CGMCC 4.1684, DSM 43125, ETH 32694, IFM 1166, IFM 1244, IFO 12555, IMET 9250, JCM 3070, KACC 20007, KCC A-0070, KCCA-0070, KCTC 9120, Kuznetsov26A-32, LBG A 3125, NBIMCC 1471, NBRC 12555, NCIB 10179, NCIMB 10179, RIA 807, VKM Ac-905

Synonyms
- Actinoplanes armeniacus

Species of bacterium

Streptomyces armeniacus is a bacterium species from the genus Streptomyces which has isolated from soil. Streptomyces armeniacus produces streptopyrrole.

== See also ==
- List of Streptomyces species
