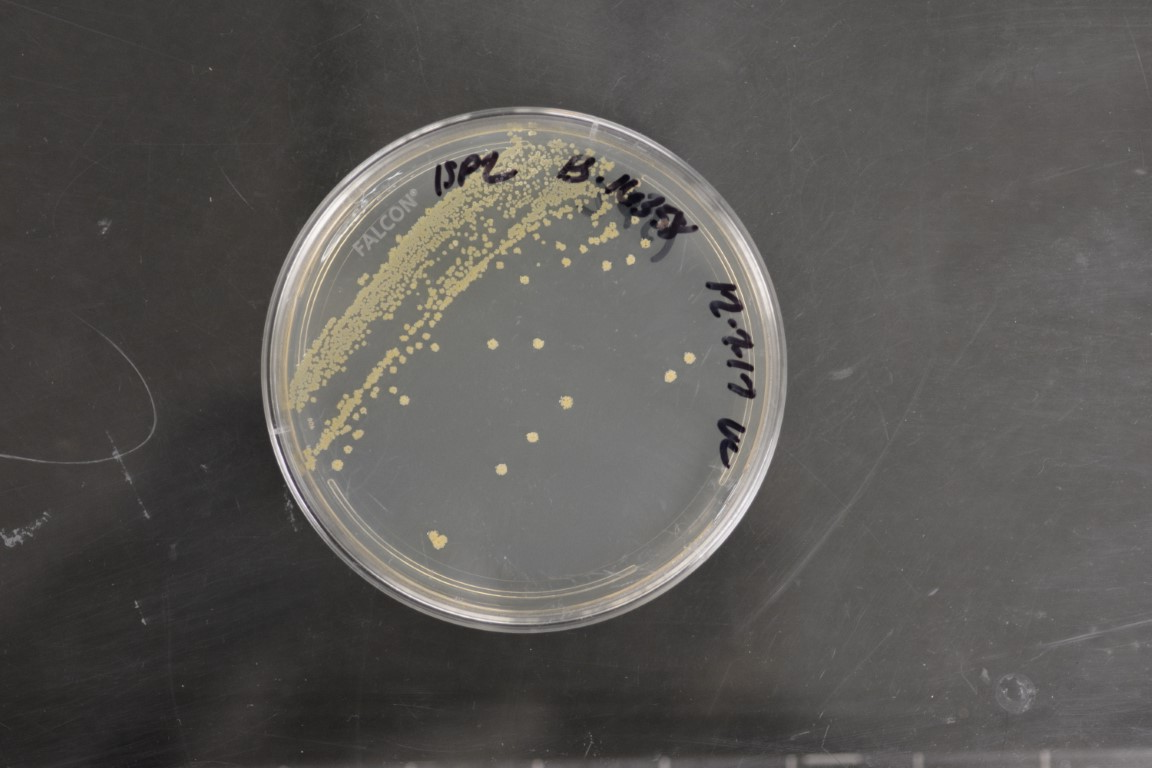

Scientific classification
- Domain: Bacteria
- Kingdom: Bacillati
- Phylum: Actinomycetota
- Class: Actinomycetia
- Order: Streptomycetales
- Family: Streptomycetaceae
- Genus: Streptomyces
- Species: S. caniferus

Binomial name
- Streptomyces caniferus (ex Krassilnikov 1970) Preobrazhenskaya 1986

Type strain
- AS 4.1588, ATCC 43699, BCRC 16851, CCRC 16851, CGMCC 4.1588, DSM 41453, IFO 15389, INMI 377, JCM 6914, NBRC 15389, NRRL B-16358, VKM 68, VKM Ac-68

Synonyms
- "Actinomyces caniferus" Krassilnikov 1970

= Streptomyces caniferus =

Species of bacterium

Streptomyces caniferus is a bacterium species from the genus of Streptomyces.

== See also ==
- List of Streptomyces species
