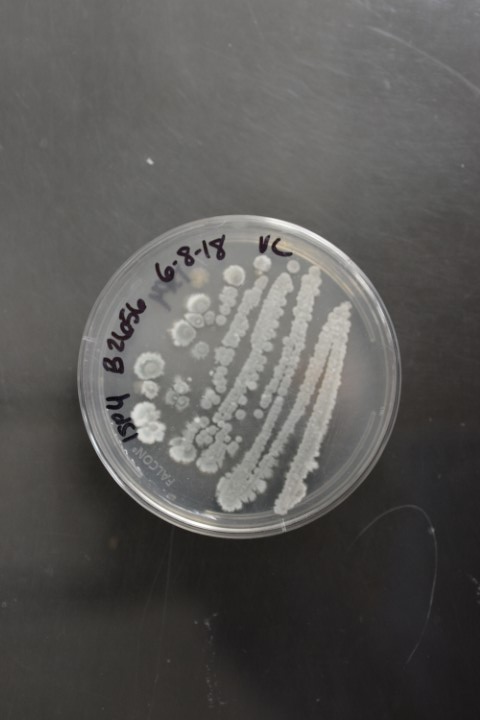

Scientific classification
- Domain: Bacteria
- Kingdom: Bacillati
- Phylum: Actinomycetota
- Class: Actinomycetes
- Order: Streptomycetales
- Family: Streptomycetaceae
- Genus: Streptomyces
- Species: S. polychromogenes

Binomial name
- Streptomyces polychromogenes Hagemann et al. 1964

Type strain
- ATCC 12595, ATCC 25484, BCRC 11899, CBS 311.56, CBS 912.69, CCRC 11899, CMI T-4473, DSM 40316, ETH 23877, ETH 31545, Hagemann T-4473, IFO 13072, ISP 5316, JCM 4236, JCM 4505, KCC S-0236, KCC S-0505, KCC S-O236, KCCM 12369, KCCS-0236, KCCS-0505, KCTC 9765, NBRC 13072, NCIB 8791, NCIMB 8791, NIHJ 414, NRRL B-12233, NRRL B-2656, NRRL B-3032, NRRL B-5697, NRRL-ISP 5316, RIA 1264, RIA 362, T4473, UCLAF T-4473, UCLAFT4473, VKM Ac-1207

= Streptomyces polychromogenes =

Species of bacterium

Streptomyces polychromogenes is a bacterium species from the genus of Streptomyces which has been isolated from soil in Venezuela. Streptomyces polychromogenes produces o-carbamylserine.

== See also ==
- List of Streptomyces species
