= Streptomyces thermovulgaris =

Scientific classification
- Domain: Bacteria
- Kingdom: Bacillati
- Phylum: Actinomycetota
- Class: Actinomycetes
- Order: Streptomycetales
- Family: Streptomycetaceae
- Genus: Streptomyces
- Species: S. thermovulgaris

Binomial name
- Streptomyces thermovulgaris Henssen 1957

Type strain
- AS 4.1455, ATCC 19284, ATCC 25501, BCRC 12488, BCRC 12638, CBS 276.66, CBS 643.69, CCRC 12488, CCRC 12638, CGMCC 4.1455, DSM 40444, Henssen R10, HUT-6605, IFO 12383, IFO 13089, IFO 16607, IFO 16615, ISP 5444, JCM 4338, JCM 4520, KACC 20092, KCC S-0240, KCC S-0338, KCC S-0520, KCCS-0520, KCTC 19949, Lanoot R-8706, LMG 19342, MTCC 1822, NBRC 12383, NBRC 13089, NBRC 16607, NBRC 16615, NCIB 10078, NCIMB 10078, NRRL B-12375, NRRL-ISP 5444, R-10, R-8706, RIA 1281, VKM Ac-1745

Synonyms
- Streptomyces thermonitrificans

Species of bacterium

Streptomyces thermovulgaris is a thermophilic bacterium species from the genus of Streptomyces which has been isolated from cow manure. Streptomyces thermovulgaris produces protease.

== See also ==
- List of Streptomyces species
