= Streptomyces ardus =

Scientific classification
- Domain: Bacteria
- Kingdom: Bacillati
- Phylum: Actinomycetota
- Class: Actinomycetia
- Order: Streptomycetales
- Family: Streptomycetaceae
- Genus: Streptomyces
- Species: S. ardus

Binomial name
- Streptomyces ardus (De Boer et al. 1961) Witt and Stackebrandt 1991

Type strain
- AS 4.167, ATCC 27417, BCRC 12319, CBS 731.72, CCRC 12319, CECT 3254, CEST 3254, CGMCC 4.1670, CIP 108147, DSM 40527, DSMZ 40527, IFO 13430, IPV 2020, ISP 5522, ISP 5527, JCM 4543, JCM 4722, KCC S-0543, KCC S-0722, KCTC 9887, NBIMCC 1592, NBRC 13430, NCB 99, NRRL 2817, NRRL B-2817, NRRL-ISP 5527, RIA 1391, UC2500, Upjohn Co. UC 2500, VKM Ac-930

Synonyms
- Streptoverticillium ardum (De Boer et al. 1961) Locci et al. 1969 (Approved Lists 1980); "Streptomyces ardus" De Boer et al. 1961

Species of bacterium

Streptomyces ardus is a bacterium species from the genus Streptomyces which has been isolated from soil. Streptomyces ardus produces porfiromycin.

== See also ==
- List of Streptomyces species
