= Streptomyces prasinopilosus =

Scientific classification
- Domain: Bacteria
- Kingdom: Bacillati
- Phylum: Actinomycetota
- Class: Actinomycetes
- Order: Streptomycetales
- Family: Streptomycetaceae
- Genus: Streptomyces
- Species: S. prasinopilosus

Binomial name
- Streptomyces prasinopilosus Ettlinger et al. 1958

Type strain
- AS 4.1525, ATCC 19799, BCRC 13678, CBS 551.68, CCRC 13678, CGMCC 4.1311, CGMCC 4.1525, DSM 40098, ETH 13675, ETH 13765, ICMP 134, IFO 12809, ISP 5098, JCM 4207, JCM 4404, KCC S-0207, KCC S-0404, KCCS-0207, KCCS-0404, Lanoot R-10800, LMG 19345, NBRC 12809, NCIB 9842, NCIMB 9842, NRRL B-2711, NRRL-ISP 5098, NZRCC 10339, R-10800, R-8709, RIA 1078, UNIQEM 185, VKM Ac-1740

Synonyms
- Streptomyces emeiensis Sun et al. 2007

Species of bacterium

Streptomyces prasinopilosus is a bacterium species from the genus of Streptomyces which has been isolated from soil on Mallorca in Spain. Streptomyces prasinopilosus produces prasinomycin.

== See also ==
- List of Streptomyces species
