= Streptomyces cremeus =

Scientific classification
- Domain: Bacteria
- Kingdom: Bacillati
- Phylum: Actinomycetota
- Class: Actinomycetes
- Order: Streptomycetales
- Family: Streptomycetaceae
- Genus: Streptomyces
- Species: S. cremeus

Binomial name
- Streptomyces cremeus (Kudrina 1957) Pridham et al. 1958 (Approved Lists 1980)

Type strain
- AS 4.1625, ATCC 19744, ATCC 19897, BCRC 11466, CBS 483.68, CCRC 11466, CGMCC 4.1625, DSM 40147, ETH 24195, IFO 12760, IMET 43743, INA 815/54, ISP 5147, JCM 4362, KCC S-0362, KCCS-0362, Lilly 228-760B-193, NBRC 12760, NCIB 10030, NCIB 9596, NCIMB, NCIMB 10030, NCIMB 9596, NRRL 3241, NRRL B-2583, NRRL-ISP 5147, RIA 1025, UC5085, UNIQEM 131, VKM Ac-1844

Synonyms
- "Actinomyces cremeus" Kudrina 1957

Species of bacterium

Streptomyces cremeus is a bacterium species from the genus of Streptomyces which has been isolated from the Caucasus region in Russia. Streptomyces cremeus produces cremomycin.

== See also ==
- List of Streptomyces species
