= Streptomyces prunicolor =

Scientific classification
- Domain: Bacteria
- Kingdom: Bacillati
- Phylum: Actinomycetota
- Class: Actinomycetes
- Order: Streptomycetales
- Family: Streptomycetaceae
- Genus: Streptomyces
- Species: S. prunicolor

Binomial name
- Streptomyces prunicolor Pridham et al. 1958

Type strain
- AS 4.1413, ATCC 25487, BCRC 15146, CBS 915.69, CCRC 15146, CGMCC 4.1413, DSM 40335, Gause8805/64, IFO 13075, IMET 43129, IMSNU 20276, INA 8805, INA 8805/64, ISP 5335, JCM 4508, KACC 20018, KCC S-0508, KCCS-0508, Lanoot R-8672, LMG 19311, NBIMCC 3317, NBRC 13075, NCIB 9978, NCIMB 9978, NRRL B-12281, NRRL-ISP 5335, PCM 2370, R-8672, RIA 1267, VKM Ac-992

Synonyms
- Actinomyces prunicolor

Species of bacterium

Streptomyces prunicolor is a bacterium species from the genus of Streptomyces which has been isolated from soil in Russia. Streptomyces prunicolor produces Pironetin and the free radical scavengers benthocyanin A, benthocyanin B and benthocyanin C.

== See also ==
- List of Streptomyces species
