= Streptomyces cinereus =

Scientific classification
- Domain: Bacteria
- Kingdom: Bacillati
- Phylum: Actinomycetota
- Class: Actinomycetia
- Order: Streptomycetales
- Family: Streptomycetaceae
- Genus: Streptomyces
- Species: S. cinereus

Binomial name
- Streptomyces cinereus (Cross et al. 1963) Goodfellow et al. 1986

Type strain
- 3855, AS 4.1672, ATCC 15840, BCRC 11616, BootsB9885, CBS 356.67, CBS 35767, CCRC 11616, CGMCC 4.1672, CUB 301, DSM 43033, IFM 1137, IFM 1237, IFO 12247, IMET 43557, IMRU 3855, JCM 3040, KCC 3040, KCC A-0040, KCCA-0040, KCTC 9066, KCTC 9194, NBIMCC 1639, NBRC 12247, NCIB 9586, NCIMB 9586, NRRL B-2909, NRRL WC 3855, RIA 809, VKM Ac-812

Synonyms
- Microellobosporia cinerea Cross et al. 1963 (Approved Lists 1980)

Species of bacterium

Streptomyces cinereus is a bacterium species from the genus of Streptomyces which has been isolated from soil. Streptomyces cinereus produces ferramidochloromycin.

== See also ==
- List of Streptomyces species
