= Streptomyces litmocidini =

Scientific classification
- Domain: Bacteria
- Kingdom: Bacillati
- Phylum: Actinomycetota
- Class: Actinomycetes
- Order: Streptomycetales
- Family: Streptomycetaceae
- Genus: Streptomyces
- Species: S. litmocidini

Binomial name
- Streptomyces litmocidini (Ryabova and Preobrazhenskaya 1957) Pridham et al. 1958 (Approved Lists 1980)

Type strain
- ATCC 19780, ATCC 19914, BCRC 11866, CBS 533.68, CCRC 11866, CGMCC 4.1902, DSM 40164, ETH 24198, IFO 12792, INA 1823/55, INA N 1823/55, ISP 5164, JCM 4394, KCC S-0394, NBRC 12792, NRRL B-3635, NRRL-ISP 5164, Preobrazhenskaya INA 1823/55, RIA 1060, UNIQEM 167, VKM Ac-1887, VKMAc-1887, VTT E-072753

Synonyms
- "Actinomyces litmocidini" Ryabova and Preobrazhenskaya 1957

Species of bacterium

Streptomyces litmocidini is a bacterium species from the genus of Streptomyces which has been isolated from soil. Streptomyces litmocidini produces granaticin and litmocidin.

== See also ==
- List of Streptomyces species
