= Streptomyces nigrescens =

Scientific classification
- Domain: Bacteria
- Kingdom: Bacillati
- Phylum: Actinomycetota
- Class: Actinomycetes
- Order: Streptomycetales
- Family: Streptomycetaceae
- Genus: Streptomyces
- Species: S. nigrescens

Binomial name
- Streptomyces nigrescens Pridham et al. 1958

Type strain
- 1800/54, AS 4.1410, ATCC 23941, BCRC 15127, CBS 103.61, CBS 925.68, CCRC 15127, CGMCC 4.1410, DSM 40276, ETH 28443, IFO 12894, INA 1800/54, ISP 5276, JCM 4401, KCC S-0401, KCCS-0401, Lanoot R-8696, LMG 19332, NBRC 12894, NCIB 9856, NCIMB 9856, NRRL B-12176, NRRL-ISP 5276, R-8696, RIA 1194, VKM Ac-1705

Synonyms
- Streptomyces ruanii, Actinomyces nigrescens

Species of bacterium

Streptomyces nigrescens is a bacterium species from the genus of Streptomyces which has been isolated from soil. Streptomyces nigrescens produces 5-alkyl-1,2,3,4-tetrahydroquinolines and the antibiotics phoslactomycin A - F.

== See also ==
- List of Streptomyces species
