= Streptomyces pactum =

Scientific classification
- Domain: Bacteria
- Kingdom: Bacillati
- Phylum: Actinomycetota
- Class: Actinomycetes
- Order: Streptomycetales
- Family: Streptomycetaceae
- Genus: Streptomyces
- Species: S. pactum

Binomial name
- Streptomyces pactum Bhuyan et al. 1962

Type strain
- AS 4.1443, ATCC 27456, BCRC 12076, CBS 461.69, CBS 734.72, CCRC 12076, CGMCC 4.1443, DSM 40530, DSM 41250, IFO 13433, IMET 43357, ISP 5530, JCM 4288, JCM 4809, KCC S-0288, KCC S-0809, KCCS-0288, KCCS-0809, KCTC 9165, Lanoot R-8722, LMG 19357, NBRC 13433, NCIB 9445, NCIMB 9445, NRRL 2939, NRRL B-2939, NRRL-ISP 5530, R-8722, RIA 1394, UC 2432, VKM Ac-1911, VTT E-073029

Synonyms
- Streptomyces pactum var. pactum

Species of bacterium

Streptomyces pactum is a bacterium species from the genus of Streptomyces. Streptomyces pactum produces pactamycin, actinopyrones, and piericidins.

== See also ==
- List of Streptomyces species
