= Streptomyces sulphureus =

Scientific classification
- Domain: Bacteria
- Kingdom: Bacillati
- Phylum: Actinomycetota
- Class: Actinomycetes
- Order: Streptomycetales
- Family: Streptomycetaceae
- Genus: Streptomyces
- Species: S. sulphureus

Binomial name
- Streptomyces sulphureus Waksman 1953

Type strain
- AS 4.0627, ATCC 27468, BCRC 13764, CBS 646.72, CCRC 13764, CGMCC 4.0627, DSM 40104, ETH 24174, Gasperini, HUT-6080, IFO 13345, IMET 40623, IPV 510, IPV 510 X, ISP 5104, JCM 4085, JCM 4835, KCC S-0085, KCC S-0835, Lanoot R-8720, LMG 19355, NBRC 13345, NRRL B-1627, NRRL B-2195, NRRL B-B-2195, NRRL-ISP 5104, R-8720, RIA 1306, strain 16 Inter. Com, VKM Ac-1820

Synonyms
- Actinomyces sulphureus Nocardia sulphurea, Streptothrix sulphurea

Species of bacterium

Streptomyces sulphureus is a bacterium species from the genus of Streptomyces which has been isolated from marine sediments in Dalian in China.

== See also ==
- List of Streptomyces species
