= Streptomyces lavendofoliae =

Scientific classification
- Domain: Bacteria
- Kingdom: Bacillati
- Phylum: Actinomycetota
- Class: Actinomycetia
- Order: Streptomycetales
- Family: Streptomycetaceae
- Genus: Streptomyces
- Species: S. lavendofoliae

Binomial name
- Streptomyces lavendofoliae (Kuchaeva et al. 1961) Pridham 1970 (Approved Lists 1980)

Type strain
- ATCC 15872, ATCC 23928, BCRC 13795, CBS 912.68, CCRC 13795, CGMCC 4.1891, DSM 40217, IFO 12882, INA 3613, INMI 3613, ISP 5217, JCM 4391, KCCS-0391, LMG 19935, NBRC 12882, NCIB 9823, NCIMB 9823, NRRL B-3371, NRRL-ISP 5217, RIA 1161, RIA 750, VKM Ac-272

Synonyms
- "Actinomyces lavendofoliae" Kuchaeva et al. 1961

Species of bacterium

Streptomyces lavendofoliae is a bacterium species from the genus of Streptomyces which has been isolated from soil in Russia. Streptomyces lavendofoliae produces fosfazinomycin A, fosfazinomycin B and piperastatin B

== See also ==
- List of Streptomyces species
