= Streptomyces roseiscleroticus =

Scientific classification
- Domain: Bacteria
- Kingdom: Bacillati
- Phylum: Actinomycetota
- Class: Actinomycetes
- Order: Streptomycetales
- Family: Streptomycetaceae
- Genus: Streptomyces
- Species: S. roseiscleroticus

Binomial name
- Streptomyces roseiscleroticus Pridham 1970

Type strain
- ATCC 17755, BCRC 12541, BCRC 15137, CBS 226.65, CBS 664.72, CCRC 12541, CCRC 15137, CMI 112 788, CMI 112788, DSM 40303, HACC 144, IFO 13002, IFO 13363, IFO 18002, IMET 43586, ISP 5303, JCM 3104, JCM 4823, KCC A-0104, KCC S-0823, NBRC 13002, NBRC 13363, NCIB 11013, NCIMB 11013, NRRL B-3348, NRRL-ISP 5303, RIA 1324, RIA 887, VKM Ac-1718

Synonyms
- Chainia rosea

Species of bacterium

Streptomyces roseiscleroticus is a bacterium species from the genus of Streptomyces which has been isolated from soil from the Gujarat State in India. Streptomyces roseiscleroticus produces sultriecin.

== See also ==
- List of Streptomyces species
