= Streptomyces cinnabarinus =

Scientific classification
- Domain: Bacteria
- Kingdom: Bacillati
- Phylum: Actinomycetota
- Class: Actinomycetes
- Order: Streptomycetales
- Family: Streptomycetaceae
- Genus: Streptomyces
- Species: S. cinnabarinus

Binomial name
- Streptomyces cinnabarinus (Ryabova and Preobrazhenskaya 1957) Pridham et al. 1958 (Approved Lists 1980)

Type strain
- AS 4.159, AS 4.1590, ATCC 23617, ATCC 25440, BCRC 15162, CBS 671.69, CCRC 15162, CGMCC 4.1590, DSM 40467, IFO 13028, INA 1242, ISP 5467, JCM 4463, KCC S-0463, NBRC 13028, NRRL B-12382, NRRL-ISP 5467, PCM 2311, RIA 1220, VKM Ac-1904

Synonyms
- "Actinomyces cinnabarinus" Ryabova and Preobrazhenskaya 1957

Species of bacterium

Streptomyces cinnabarinus is a bacterium species from the genus of Streptomyces which has been isolated from soil from a hot climate area. Streptomyces cinnabarinus produces lobocompactol.

== See also ==
- List of Streptomyces species
