= Streptomyces lavenduligriseus =

Scientific classification
- Domain: Bacteria
- Kingdom: Bacillati
- Phylum: Actinomycetota
- Class: Actinomycetes
- Order: Streptomycetales
- Family: Streptomycetaceae
- Genus: Streptomyces
- Species: S. lavenduligriseus

Binomial name
- Streptomyces lavenduligriseus (Locci et al. 1969) Witt and Stackebrandt 1991

Type strain
- AS 4.1851, ATCC 13306, ATCC 29661, BA-6903, BCRC 15166, CBS 706.72, CCRC 15166, CGMCC 4.1913, DSM 40487, FD 22124, IFO 13405, IPV 2048, ISP 5487, JCM 4545, JCM 4779, NBRC 13405, NRRL B-3173, NRRL-ISP 5487, Pfizer BA-6903, RIA 1366, VKM Ac-1159

Synonyms
- Streptoverticillium lavenduligriseum Locci et al. 1969 (Approved Lists 1980)

Species of bacterium

Streptomyces lavenduligriseus is a bacterium species from the genus of Streptomyces. Streptomyces lavenduligriseus produces Pentenomycin II, Pentenomycin III and narangomyci.

== See also ==
- List of Streptomyces species
