= Streptomyces cinereoruber =

Scientific classification
- Domain: Bacteria
- Kingdom: Bacillati
- Phylum: Actinomycetota
- Class: Actinomycetes
- Order: Streptomycetales
- Family: Streptomycetaceae
- Genus: Streptomyces
- Species: S. cinereoruber

Binomial name
- Streptomyces cinereoruber Corbaz et al. 1957

Type strain
- AS 4.1698, ATCC 19740, BCRC 11816, CBS 479.68, CCRC 11816, CGMCC 4.1698, DSM 40012, DSM 41512, ETH 7451, IFO 12756, ISP 5012, JCM 4205, JCM 4572, KCC S-0205, KCC S-0572, KCCS-0205, KCCS-0572, KCTC 9706, NBRC 12756, NCIB 9797, NCIMB 9797, NRRL 2589, NRRL-ISP 5012, PSAM 192, RIA 1021, RIA 535, UNIQEM 116, VKM Ac-1860

Species of bacterium

Streptomyces cinereoruber is a bacterium species from the genus of Streptomyces which has isolated from soil. Streptomyces cinereoruber produces chinerubin A, chinerubin B, rhodomycin A and rhodomycin B.

== See also ==
- List of Streptomyces species
