= Streptomyces griseoaurantiacus =

Scientific classification
- Domain: Bacteria
- Kingdom: Bacillati
- Phylum: Actinomycetota
- Class: Actinomycetes
- Order: Streptomycetales
- Family: Streptomycetaceae
- Genus: Streptomyces
- Species: S. griseoaurantiacus

Binomial name
- Streptomyces griseoaurantiacus (Krassilnikov and Yuan 1965) Pridham 1970 (Approved Lists 1980)

Type strain
- AK-5, ATCC 19840, BCRC 16244, CBS 682.72, CCRC 16244, DSM 40430, IFO 13381, IFO 15440, INMI AK-5, ISP 5430, JCM 4763, KCC S-0763, NBRC 13381, NBRC 15440, NRRL-ISP 5430, RIA 1342, VKM Ac-1728

Synonyms
- "Actinomyces griseoaurantiacus" Krassilnikov and Yuan 1965

Species of bacterium

Streptomyces griseoaurantiacus is a thermotolerant bacterium species from the genus of Streptomyces which was isolated from marine sediment. Streptomyces griseoaurantiacus produces the antibiotics manumycin, diperamycin and chinikomycin, and griseolic acid.

== See also ==
- List of Streptomyces species
