= Streptomyces coelescens =

Scientific classification
- Domain: Bacteria
- Kingdom: Bacillati
- Phylum: Actinomycetota
- Class: Actinomycetes
- Order: Streptomycetales
- Family: Streptomycetaceae
- Genus: Streptomyces
- Species: S. coelescens

Binomial name
- Streptomyces coelescens (Krassilnikov et al. 1965) Pridham 1970 (Approved Lists 1980)

Type strain
- 20-41, AS 4.1594, ATCC 19830, BCRC 16237, CBS 679.72, CCRC 16237, CGMCC 4.1594, CJM 4739, DSM 40421, ICSSB 1021, IFO 13378, INMI 20-41, ISP 5421, JCM 4739, KCC S-0739, KCCS-0739, KCTC 19065, NBRC 13378, NCIB 10042, NCIMB 10042, NRRL B-12348, NRRL-ISP 5421, RIA 1339, VKM Ac-98, VTT E-073027

Synonyms
- "Actinomyces coelescens" Krassilnikov et al. 1965

Species of bacterium

Streptomyces coelescens is a bacterium species from the genus of Streptomyces. Streptomyces coelescens produces glycoglycerolipids.

== See also ==
- List of Streptomyces species
