= Streptomyces violaceochromogenes =

Scientific classification
- Domain: Bacteria
- Kingdom: Bacillati
- Phylum: Actinomycetota
- Class: Actinomycetia
- Order: Streptomycetales
- Family: Streptomycetaceae
- Genus: Streptomyces
- Species: S. violaceochromogenes

Binomial name
- Streptomyces violaceochromogenes Pridham 1970

Type strain
- ATCC 19932, ATCC 25512, BCC 7125, BCRC 13782, CBS 201.74, CBS 654.69, CCRC 13782, CGMCC 4.1753, DSM 40181, IFO 13100, INA 425, ISP 5181, JCM 4530, KCC S-0530, KCTC 19974, NBRC 13100, NRRL B-5427, NRRL-ISP 5181, RIA 1292, VKM Ac-581

Synonyms
- Actinomyces violaceochromogenes, Actinomyces violaceus chromogenes, Actinomyces violochromogenes

Species of bacterium

Streptomyces violaceochromogenes is a bacterium species from the genus of Streptomyces which has been isolated from soil. Streptomyces violaceochromogenes produces cinerubin x, cinerubin y, arugomycin and viriplanin D.

== See also ==
- List of Streptomyces species
