= Streptomyces iakyrus =

Scientific classification
- Domain: Bacteria
- Kingdom: Bacillati
- Phylum: Actinomycetota
- Class: Actinomycetes
- Order: Streptomycetales
- Family: Streptomycetaceae
- Genus: Streptomyces
- Species: S. iakyrus

Binomial name
- Streptomyces iakyrus de Querioz and Albert 1962 (Approved Lists 1980)

Type strain
- ATCC 15375, BCRC 11930, CBS 702.72, CCRC 11930, CGMCC 4.1912, DSM 40482, IAUR 3119, IAUR 3923, IFO 13401, INMI 15375, ISP 5482, JCM 4254, JCM 4773, KCC S-0254, NBRC 13401, NRRL B-3317, NRRL B-3634, NRRL B-B-3634, NRRL-ISP 5482, RIA 1362, VKM Ac-201

Species of bacterium

Streptomyces iakyrus is a bacterium species from the genus of Streptomyces which has been isolated from soil Streptomyces iakyrus produces actinomycin G2, actinomycin G3, actinomycin G4, actinomycin G5, actinomycin G6, iakirine I, iakirine II and iakirine III.

== See also ==
- List of Streptomyces species
