= Streptomyces flaveus =

Scientific classification
- Domain: Bacteria
- Kingdom: Bacillati
- Phylum: Actinomycetota
- Class: Actinomycetes
- Order: Streptomycetales
- Family: Streptomycetaceae
- Genus: Streptomyces
- Species: S. flaveus

Binomial name
- Streptomyces flaveus (Cross et al. 1963) Goodfellow et al. 1986

Type strain
- AS 4.1157, ATCC 15332, CBS 355.67, CUB 315, DSM 43029, DSM 43153, IFM 1234, IFO 12190, IMET 43554, IMRU 3857, JCM 3035, KCC 3035, KCC A-0035, Lanoot R-8685, LMG 19323, NBRC 12190, NCIB 9587, NCIMB 9587, NRRL B-16074, R-8685, RIA 810, RIA 896, strain 56, VKM Ac-1295, VKM Ac-633, W56, Waksman 3857, WC 3857

Synonyms
- Microellobosporia flavea Cross et al. 1963 (Approved Lists 1980)

Species of bacteria

Streptomyces flaveus is a bacterium species from the genus of Streptomyces which has been isolated from soil.

== See also ==
- List of Streptomyces species
