= Streptomyces griseoloalbus =

Scientific classification
- Domain: Bacteria
- Kingdom: Bacillati
- Phylum: Actinomycetota
- Class: Actinomycetes
- Order: Streptomycetales
- Family: Streptomycetaceae
- Genus: Streptomyces
- Species: S. griseoloalbus

Binomial name
- Streptomyces griseoloalbus (Kudrina 1957) Pridham et al. 1958 (Approved Lists 1980)

Type strain
- ATCC 23624, ATCC 25458, BCRC 16207, CBS 691.69, CCRC 16207, CGMCC 4.1383, CGMCC AS 4.1383, DSM 40468, ETH 28520, IFO 13046, INA 1875, INA 1875 \/54, INA 1875/54, ISP 5468, JCM 4480, NBRC 13046, NRRL B-12383, NRRL-ISP 5468, RIA 1238, VKM Ac-1739

Synonyms
- "Actinomyces griseoloalbus" Kudrina 1957

Species of bacterium

Streptomyces griseoloalbus is a bacterium species from the genus of Streptomyces which has been isolated from soil. Streptomyces griseoloalbus produces grisein.

== See also ==
- List of Streptomyces species
