= Streptomyces ruber =

Scientific classification
- Domain: Bacteria
- Kingdom: Bacillati
- Phylum: Actinomycetota
- Class: Actinomycetes
- Order: Streptomycetales
- Family: Streptomycetaceae
- Genus: Streptomyces
- Species: S. ruber

Binomial name
- Streptomyces ruber Goodfellow et al. 1986

Type strain
- ATCC 17754, BCRC 12358, BCRC 15138, CBS 228.65, CCRC 12358, CCRC 15138, CGMCC 4.1925, CMI 112789, CMI 1973, DSM 40304, HACC 143, IFO 14600, ISP 5304, JCM 3131, KCC 3131, KCC A-0131, KCTC 19969, NBRC 14600, NCIB 10983, NCIMB 10983, NRRL B-5315, NRRL-ISP 5304

Synonyms
- Chainia rubra

Species of bacterium

Streptomyces ruber is a bacterium species from the genus of Streptomyces which has been isolated from soil from the Baikal-region in Russia. Streptomyces ruber produces mycoticins. The strain EKH2 from Streptomyces ruber has activity against virulent fish pathogens.

== See also ==
- List of Streptomyces species
