= Streptomyces massasporeus =

Scientific classification
- Domain: Bacteria
- Kingdom: Bacillati
- Phylum: Actinomycetota
- Class: Actinomycetes
- Order: Streptomycetales
- Family: Streptomycetaceae
- Genus: Streptomyces
- Species: S. massasporeus

Binomial name
- Streptomyces massasporeus Shinobu and Kawato 1959

Type strain
- AS 4.1333, AS 4.1433, ATCC 19785, BCRC 13647, CBS 537.68, CCRC 13647, CGMCC 4.1433, DSM 40035, ETH 28501, IFO 12796, IFO 3841, ISP 5035, JCM 4139, JCM 4593, KCC S-0139, KCC S-0593, KCTC 19943, Lanoot R-8727, LMG 19362, NBRC 12796, NBRC 3841, NRRL B-3300, NRRL-ISP 5035, OEU 602, R-8727, RIA 1064, RIA 652, Shinobu 602, UNIQEM 171, VKM Ac-578

Species of bacterium

Streptomyces massasporeus is a bacterium species from the genus of Streptomyces which has been isolated from soil in Japan.

== See also ==
- List of Streptomyces species
