= Streptomyces goshikiensis =

Scientific classification
- Domain: Bacteria
- Kingdom: Bacillati
- Phylum: Actinomycetota
- Class: Actinomycetia
- Order: Streptomycetales
- Family: Streptomycetaceae
- Genus: Streptomyces
- Species: S. goshikiensis

Binomial name
- Streptomyces goshikiensis Niida 1966

Type strain
- A105, ATCC 23914, BCRC 12330, CBS 835.68, CCRC 12330, CCUG 11121, CGMCC 4.1961, DSM 40190, IFO 12868, IFO 5190, IMET 42067, ISP 5190, JCM 4294, JCM 4640, KCC S-0294, KCC S-0640, KCCS-0294, KCCS-0640, NBRC 12868, NCIB 9828, NCIMB 9828, NRRL B-5428, NRRL-ISP 5190, RIA 1144, VKM Ac-1212

Species of bacterium

Streptomyces goshikiensis is a bacterium species from the genus of Streptomyces which has been isolated from soil in Japan. Streptomyces goshikiensis produces bandamycin A and bandamycin B.

== See also ==
- List of Streptomyces species
