= Streptomyces chryseus =

Scientific classification
- Domain: Bacteria
- Kingdom: Bacillati
- Phylum: Actinomycetota
- Class: Actinomycetes
- Order: Streptomycetales
- Family: Streptomycetaceae
- Genus: Streptomyces
- Species: S. chryseus

Binomial name
- Streptomyces chryseus (Krassilnikov et al. 1965) Pridham 1970 (Approved Lists 1980)

Type strain
- 1007B, AS 4.1694, ATCC 19829, BCRC 16236, CBS 678.72, CCRC 16236, CGMCC 4.1694, DSM 40420, IFO 13377, INMI 1007 B, ISP 5420, JCM 4737, KCC S-0737, KCCS-0737, Krassilnikov 1007-B, NBRC 13377, NCIB 10041, NCIMB 10041, NRRL B-12347, NRRL-ISP 5420, RIA 1338, VKM Ac-200

Synonyms
- "Actinomyces chryseus" Krassilnikov et al. 1965

Species of bacterium

Streptomyces chryseus is a bacterium species from the genus of Streptomyces.

== See also ==
- List of Streptomyces species
