= Streptomyces flavofungini =

Scientific classification
- Domain: Bacteria
- Kingdom: Bacillati
- Phylum: Actinomycetota
- Class: Actinomycetes
- Order: Streptomycetales
- Family: Streptomycetaceae
- Genus: Streptomyces
- Species: S. flavofungini

Binomial name
- Streptomyces flavofungini (ex Úri and Békési 1958) Szabó and Preobrazhenskaya 1986

Type strain
- ATCC 27430, BCRC 15154, CBS 411.59, CBS 672.72, CCRC 15154, DSM 40366, IFO 13371, ISP 5366, JCM 4753, KCC S-0753, LMG 8598, NBRC 13371, NRRL B-12307, NRRL-ISP 5366, RIA 1332, SA-IX-3, UAMH 6125, VKM Ac-1179

Synonyms
- "Actinomyces flavofungini" Úri and Békési 1958

Species of bacteria

Streptomyces flavofungini is a bacterium species from the genus of Streptomyces which has been isolated from desert sand. Streptomyces flavofungini produces flavofungin I, flavofungin II.

== See also ==
- List of Streptomyces species
