= Streptomyces afghaniensis =

Scientific classification
- Domain: Bacteria
- Kingdom: Bacillati
- Phylum: Actinomycetota
- Class: Actinomycetia
- Order: Streptomycetales
- Family: Streptomycetaceae
- Genus: Streptomyces
- Species: S. afghaniensis

Binomial name
- Streptomyces afghaniensis Shimo et al. 1959 (Approved Lists 1980)

Type strain
- AS 4.1689, ATCC 23871, BCRC 12056, CBS 610.68, CCRC 12056, CCT 5011, CGMCC 4.1689, DSM 40228, ETH 31570, IFO 12831, IMET 42942, ISP 5228, JCM 4340, KCC S-0340, KCCM 40178, KCTC 9743, NBRC 12831, NRRL B-5621, NRRL-ISP 5228, RIA 1169, Shimo 772, VKM Ac-703

Species of bacterium

Streptomyces afghaniensis is a bacterium species from the genus of Streptomyces which has been isolated from soil in Afghanistan. Streptomyces afghaniensis produces the antibiotic taitomycin.

== See also ==
- List of Streptomyces species
