= Streptomyces fumigatiscleroticus =

Scientific classification
- Domain: Bacteria
- Kingdom: Bacillati
- Phylum: Actinomycetota
- Class: Actinomycetia
- Order: Streptomycetales
- Family: Streptomycetaceae
- Genus: Streptomyces
- Species: S. fumigatiscleroticus

Binomial name
- Streptomyces fumigatiscleroticus (ex Pridham 1970) Goodfellow et al. 1986

Type strain
- ATCC 19345, BCRC 12344, CBS 639.66, CCRC 12344, CGMCC 4.1909, CMI 117 720, CMI 117720, DSM 43154, HACC 145, IFO 12999, JCM 3101, KCC 12999, KCC 3101, KCC A-0101, NBRC 12999, NCIB 11004, NCIMB 11004, NRRL B-3856, RIA 884

Synonyms
- Chainia fumigata Thirumalachar et al. 1966 (Approved Lists 1980)

Species of bacterium

Streptomyces fumigatiscleroticus is a bacterium species from the genus of Streptomyces which has been isolated from soil.

== See also ==
- List of Streptomyces species
