= Streptomyces albaduncus =

Scientific classification
- Domain: Bacteria
- Kingdom: Bacillati
- Phylum: Actinomycetota
- Class: Actinomycetia
- Order: Streptomycetales
- Family: Streptomycetaceae
- Genus: Streptomyces
- Species: S. albaduncus

Binomial name
- Streptomyces albaduncus Tsukiura et al. 1964 (Approved Lists 1980)

Type strain
- A-9746, AS 4.158, ATCC 14698, BCRC 16204, Bristol-Banyu 13246, C38291, CBS 698.72, CCRC 16204, CECT 3226, CGMCC 4.1580, DSM 40478, DSMZ 40478, IFO 13397, IMSNU 20132, ISP 5478, JCM 4715, KACC 20003, Kawaguchi 13246, KCC S-0715, KCTC 1741, MTCC 924, NBRC 13397, NRRL B-3605, NRRL-ISP 5478, RIA 1358,, VKM Ac-1753

Species of bacterium

Streptomyces albaduncus is a bacterium species from the genus of Streptomyces.

== See also ==
- List of Streptomyces species
