= Streptomyces olivaceiscleroticus =

Scientific classification
- Domain: Bacteria
- Kingdom: Bacillati
- Phylum: Actinomycetota
- Class: Actinomycetes
- Order: Streptomycetales
- Family: Streptomycetaceae
- Genus: Streptomyces
- Species: S. olivaceiscleroticus

Binomial name
- Streptomyces olivaceiscleroticus Pridham 1970

Type strain
- ATCC 15722, ATCC 15897, BCRC 11608, CBS 296.66, CBS 785.72, CCRC 11608, CGMCC 4.1991, DSM 40595, IFO 13484, IMRU 3751, ISP 5595, JCM 3045, JCM 4805, KCTC 19945, KCTC 19963, LMG 20081, NBRC 13484, NRBC 13484, NRRL B-2318, NRRL-ISP 5595, RIA 1445, RIA 564, WC 3751

Synonyms
- Chainia olivacea

Species of bacterium

Streptomyces olivaceiscleroticus is a bacterium species from the genus of Streptomyces which has been isolated from soil.

== See also ==
- List of Streptomyces species
