= Streptomyces roseolilacinus =

Scientific classification
- Domain: Bacteria
- Kingdom: Bacillati
- Phylum: Actinomycetota
- Class: Actinomycetes
- Order: Streptomycetales
- Family: Streptomycetaceae
- Genus: Streptomyces
- Species: S. roseolilacinus

Binomial name
- Streptomyces roseolilacinus Pridham et al. 1958

Type strain
- ATCC 19806, ATCC 19922, BCRC 12329, CBS 264.66, CBS 558.68, CCRC 12329, CGMCC 4.1776, CUB 521, DSM 40173, ETH 28444, IFO 12815, INA 14250, IPV 1835, ISP 5173, JCM 4335, JCM 4606, KCC S-0335, NBRC 12815, NRRL B-2699, NRRL-ISP 5173, RIA 1085, UNIQEM 192, VKM Ac-1276

Synonyms
- Actinomyces roseolilacinus

Species of bacterium

Streptomyces roseolilacinus is a bacterium species from the genus of Streptomyces which has been isolated from soil.

== See also ==
- List of Streptomyces species
