= Streptomyces viridodiastaticus =

Scientific classification
- Domain: Bacteria
- Kingdom: Bacillati
- Phylum: Actinomycetota
- Class: Actinomycetes
- Order: Streptomycetales
- Family: Streptomycetaceae
- Genus: Streptomyces
- Species: S. viridodiastaticus

Binomial name
- Streptomyces viridodiastaticus Pridham et al. 1958

Type strain
- ATCC 25518, Baldacci IPV 334a, BCRC 12458, CBS 660.69, CCRC 12458, CGMCC 4.1780, DSM 40249, ETH 24357, IFO 13106, IPV 334 a, ISP 5249, JCM 4536, KCC S-0536, KCTC 19977, LMG 20279, NBRC 13106, NRRL B-5622, NRRL-ISP 5249, RIA 1298, VKM Ac-1749, VTT E-011973

Synonyms
- Actinomyces virido-diastaticus

Species of bacterium

Streptomyces viridodiastaticus is a bacterium species from the genus of Streptomyces which has been isolated from soil.

== See also ==
- List of Streptomyces species
