= Streptomyces indiaensis =

Scientific classification
- Domain: Bacteria
- Kingdom: Bacillati
- Phylum: Actinomycetota
- Class: Actinomycetes
- Order: Streptomycetales
- Family: Streptomycetaceae
- Genus: Streptomyces
- Species: S. indiaensis

Binomial name
- Streptomyces indiaensis (Gupta 1965) Kudo and Seino 1987

Type strain
- ATCC 33330, CBS 560.75, CBS 56075, CGMCC 4.1952, DSM 43803, IFO 13964, JCM 3053, KCC A-0053, KCCA-0053, KCTC 9489, MCRL 41, NBRC 13964, NCIB 9794, NCIMB 9794, NRRL B-24311

Synonyms
- Streptosporangium indianensis Gupta 1965 (Approved Lists 1980); Streptosporangium indianense corrig. Gupta 1965 (Approved Lists 1980)

Species of bacterium

Streptomyces indiaensis is a bacterium species from the genus of Streptomyces which has been isolated from soil in India.

== See also ==
- List of Streptomyces species
