= Streptomyces celluloflavus =

Scientific classification
- Domain: Bacteria
- Kingdom: Bacillati
- Phylum: Actinomycetota
- Class: Actinomycetes
- Order: Streptomycetales
- Family: Streptomycetaceae
- Genus: Streptomyces
- Species: S. celluloflavus

Binomial name
- Streptomyces celluloflavus Nishimura et al. 1953

Type strain
- AS 4.1659, ATCC 29806, CECT 3242, CECT 7364, CGMCC 4.1659, DSM 40839, ETH 24125, IFO 13780, JCM 4126, KCC S-0126, KCTC 9702, NBRC 100597, NBRC 13780, NIHJ 198, NRRL B-2493, RIA 779, SRL 39a, SRL 5026, VKM Ac-1819, VTT E-86258

Species of bacterium

Streptomyces celluloflavus is a bacterium species from the genus of Streptomyces which has been isolated from soil in Japan. Streptomyces celluloflavus produces aureothricin and has the ability to degrade cellulose.

== See also ==
- List of Streptomyces species
