= Streptomyces violaceorectus =

Scientific classification
- Domain: Bacteria
- Kingdom: Bacillati
- Phylum: Actinomycetota
- Class: Actinomycetes
- Order: Streptomycetales
- Family: Streptomycetaceae
- Genus: Streptomyces
- Species: S. violaceorectus

Binomial name
- Streptomyces violaceorectus Pridham et al. 1958

Type strain
- ATCC 25514, BCRC 13626, CBS 656.69, CCRC 13626, CGMCC 4.1792, DSM 40279, IFO 13102, IMET 43520, INA 506, ISP 5279, JCM 4532, KCC S-0532, LMG 20281, NBRC 13102, NRRL B-12181, NRRL-ISP 5279, RIA 1294, VKM Ac-584

Synonyms
- Actinomyces violaceorectus

Species of bacterium

Streptomyces violaceorectus is a bacterium species from the genus of Streptomyces which has been isolated from soil. Streptomyces violaceorectus produces antimicrobial substances and alkinonase A.

== See also ==
- List of Streptomyces species
