= Streptomyces luteosporeus =

Scientific classification
- Domain: Bacteria
- Kingdom: Bacillati
- Phylum: Actinomycetota
- Class: Actinomycetes
- Order: Streptomycetales
- Family: Streptomycetaceae
- Genus: Streptomyces
- Species: S. luteosporeus

Binomial name
- Streptomyces luteosporeus Witt and Stackebrandt 1991

Type strain
- ATCC 33049, BA-3972, CGMCC 4.1992, CIP 108142, DSM 40833, IFO 14657, IPV 1993, JCM 4542, KCC S-0542, MTCC 2532, NBIMCC 1591, NBRC 14657, NRRL 2401, NRRL B-2401, VKM Ac-927

Synonyms
- Streptoverticillium album Locci et al. 1969 (Approved Lists 1980)

Species of bacterium

Streptomyces luteosporeus is a bacterium species from the genus of Streptomyces. Streptomyces luteosporeus produces acetopyrrothine and indolmycin.

== See also ==
- List of Streptomyces species
