= Streptomyces cellostaticus =

Scientific classification
- Domain: Bacteria
- Kingdom: Bacillati
- Phylum: Actinomycetota
- Class: Actinomycetes
- Order: Streptomycetales
- Family: Streptomycetaceae
- Genus: Streptomyces
- Species: S. cellostaticus

Binomial name
- Streptomyces cellostaticus Hamada 1958

Type strain
- AS 4.1637, ATCC 23894, BCRC 13786, CBS 680.68, CCRC 13786, CGMCC 4.1637, DSM 40189, IFO 12849, IMET 42066, ISP 5189, JCM 4183, JCM 4631, KCC S-0183, KCC S-0631, KCCS-0183, KCCS-0631, NBRC 12849, NCIMB 9830, NRRL-ISP 5189, RIA 1143, VKM Ac-1222

Species of bacterium

Streptomyces cellostaticus is a bacterium species from the genus of Streptomyces. Streptomyces cellostaticus produces cellostatin.

== See also ==
- List of Streptomyces species
