= Streptomyces misionensis =

Scientific classification
- Domain: Bacteria
- Kingdom: Bacillati
- Phylum: Actinomycetota
- Class: Actinomycetes
- Order: Streptomycetales
- Family: Streptomycetaceae
- Genus: Streptomyces
- Species: S. misionensis

Binomial name
- Streptomyces misionensis Cercos et al. 1962

Type strain
- ATCC 14991, ATCC 25475, BCRC 12094, CBS 885.69, CCRC 12094, Cercos 3944, CGMCC 4.1982, DSM 40306, IFO 13063, INTA 3944, ISP 5306, JCM 4497, KCC S-0497, KCCS-0497, NBRC 13063, NCIMB 12979, NRRL B-3230, NRRL-ISP 5306, RIA 1255, RV 71499, VKM Ac-626

Species of bacterium

Streptomyces misionensis is a bacterium species from the genus of Streptomyces which has been isolated from soil. Streptomyces misionensis produces misionin.

== See also ==
- List of Streptomyces species
