= Streptomyces capillispiralis =

Scientific classification
- Domain: Bacteria
- Kingdom: Bacillati
- Phylum: Actinomycetota
- Class: Actinomycetes
- Order: Streptomycetales
- Family: Streptomycetaceae
- Genus: Streptomyces
- Species: S. capillispiralis

Binomial name
- Streptomyces capillispiralis Mertz and Higgens 1982

Type strain
- A 49492, BCRC 16852, CCRC 16852, CGMCC 4.1945, DSM 41695, Eli Lilly & Co.A49492, IFO 14222, JCM 5075, KACC 20004, KCC S-1075, KCCS-1075, KCTC 1719, MS 1486, MS1485, NBRC 14222, NCIMB 12832, NRRL 12279

Species of bacterium

Streptomyces capillispiralis is a bacterium species from the genus of Streptomyces which was isolated from soil in Sweden. Streptomyces capillispiralis produces cephalosporin-C4-carboxymethyl-esterase.

== See also ==
- List of Streptomyces species
