= Streptomyces albospinus =

Scientific classification
- Domain: Bacteria
- Kingdom: Bacillati
- Phylum: Actinomycetota
- Class: Actinomycetia
- Order: Streptomycetales
- Family: Streptomycetaceae
- Genus: Streptomyces
- Species: S. albospinus

Binomial name
- Streptomyces albospinus Wang et al. 1966 (Approved Lists 1980)

Type strain
- AS 4.1628, ATCC 29808, CGMCC 4.1628, CGMCC 4.1896, DSM 41674, IFO 13846, IMC S-0602, JCM 3399, KCCM 12599, KCTC 9664, KCTC 9762, M750-G1, MTCC 6918, NBRC 13846, NRRL B-16926

Species of bacterium

Streptomyces albospinus is a bacterium species from the genus of Streptomyces which has been isolated from soil from the Akita City in Japan. Streptomyces albospinus produces spinamycine, phenamide, phenelfamycin G and phenelfamycin H.

== See also ==
- List of Streptomyces species
