= Streptomyces decoyicus =

Scientific classification
- Domain: Bacteria
- Kingdom: Bacillati
- Phylum: Actinomycetota
- Class: Actinomycetes
- Order: Streptomycetales
- Family: Streptomycetaceae
- Genus: Streptomyces
- Species: S. decoyicus

Binomial name
- Streptomyces decoyicus Kumar and Goodfellow 2010

Type strain
- AS 4.1861, AS 4.1915, CGMCC 4.1861, CGMCC 4.1915, CIP 106836, CUB 494, DSM 41427, IFO 13977, JCM 4550, KCC S-0550, KCCS-0550, LMG 19954, NBRC 13977, NCIB 9752, NCIMB 10502, NCIMB 9752, NRRL 2666, UC2345

Species of bacterium

Streptomyces decoyicus is a bacterium species from the genus of Streptomyces which has been isolated from garden soil in California in the United States. Streptomyces decoyicus produces decoyinin and psicofuranine.

== See also ==
- List of Streptomyces species
