= Streptomyces viridiviolaceus =

Scientific classification
- Domain: Bacteria
- Kingdom: Bacillati
- Phylum: Actinomycetota
- Class: Actinomycetia
- Order: Streptomycetales
- Family: Streptomycetaceae
- Genus: Streptomyces
- Species: S. viridiviolaceus

Binomial name
- Streptomyces viridiviolaceus Pridham et al. 1958

Type strain
- ATCC 27478, BCRC 12457, CBS 660.72, CCRC 12457, CGMCC 4.1775, DSM 40280, IFO 13359, INA 5276, INA 5276 \/56, INA 5276/56, ISP 5280, JCM 4855, KCTC 19976, LMG 20282, NBRC 13359, NRRL B-12182, NRRL-ISP 5280, RIA 1320, VKM Ac-587

Synonyms
- Actinomyces viridiviolaceus

Species of bacterium

Streptomyces viridiviolaceus is a bacterium species from the genus of Streptomyces.

== See also ==
- List of Streptomyces species
