= Streptomyces prasinosporus =

Scientific classification
- Domain: Bacteria
- Kingdom: Bacillati
- Phylum: Actinomycetota
- Class: Actinomycetes
- Order: Streptomycetales
- Family: Streptomycetaceae
- Genus: Streptomyces
- Species: S. prasinosporus

Binomial name
- Streptomyces prasinosporus Tresner et al. 1966

Type strain
- AS 4.1422, ATCC 17918, BCRC 15177, BD-278, CBS 720.72, CCRC 15177, CGMCC 4.1422, DSM 40506, IFO 13419, ISP 5506, JCM 4816, KCC S-0816, Lanoot R-8710, LMG 19346, NBRC 13419, NRRL B-12431, NRRL-ISP 5506, R-8710, RIA 1380, Tresner BD-278, VKM Ac-979

Species of bacterium

Streptomyces prasinosporus is a green-spored bacterium species from the genus of Streptomyces which has been isolated from soil in India.

== See also ==
- List of Streptomyces species
