= Streptomyces termitum =

Scientific classification
- Domain: Bacteria
- Kingdom: Bacillati
- Phylum: Actinomycetota
- Class: Actinomycetes
- Order: Streptomycetales
- Family: Streptomycetaceae
- Genus: Streptomyces
- Species: S. termitum

Binomial name
- Streptomyces termitum Duché et al. 1951

Type strain
- ATCC 25499, BCRC 12592, CBS 959.69, CBS.959.69, CCRC 12592, CGMCC 4.1781, DSM 40329, IFO 13087, IMET 43127, ISP 5329, JCM 4518, KCC S-0518, KCCS-0518, L.C.260, LC, LC 620, LCP 620, LMG 20289, NBRC 13087, NCIB 9980, NCIMB 9980, NRRL B-3804, NRRL-ISP 5329, RIA 1279

Species of bacterium

Streptomyces termitum is a bacterium species from the genus of Streptomyces which has been isolated from termites.

== See also ==
- List of Streptomyces species
