= Streptomyces gobitricini =

Scientific classification
- Domain: Bacteria
- Kingdom: Bacillati
- Phylum: Actinomycetota
- Class: Actinomycetes
- Order: Streptomycetales
- Family: Streptomycetaceae
- Genus: Streptomyces
- Species: S. gobitricini

Binomial name
- Streptomyces gobitricini (Preobrazhenskaya and Sveshnikova 1957) Pridham et al. 1958 (Approved Lists 1980)

Type strain
- ARI 5618, CBS 123.60, CGMCC 4.1908, DSM 41701, IFO 15419, INA 5618, JCM 5062, KCC S-1062, LMG 19910, MS 1480, NBRC 15419, NRRL B-2596

Synonyms
- "Actinomyces gobitricini" Preobrazhenskaya and Sveshnikova 1957

Species of bacterium

Streptomyces gobitricini is a bacterium species from the genus of Streptomyces which has been isolated from soil in Russia.

== See also ==
- List of Streptomyces species
