= Streptomyces sporoverrucosus =

Scientific classification
- Domain: Bacteria
- Kingdom: Bacillati
- Phylum: Actinomycetota
- Class: Actinomycetes
- Order: Streptomycetales
- Family: Streptomycetaceae
- Genus: Streptomyces
- Species: S. sporoverrucosus

Binomial name
- Streptomyces sporoverrucosus Preobrazhenskaya 1986

Type strain
- ATCC 43695, CGMCC 4.1796, DSM 41463, IFO 15458, INMI 15, JCM 6929, LMG 20314, NBRC 15458, NRRL B-16379, VKM 321, VKM Ac-321

Synonyms
- Actinomyces sporoverrucosus

Species of bacterium

Streptomyces sporoverrucosus is a bacterium species from the genus of Streptomyces. Streptomyces sporoverrucosus produces the antileukemic naphthocoumarins chrysomycin A, chrysomycin B, and chrysomycin C.

== See also ==
- List of Streptomyces species
