= Streptomyces mordarskii =

Scientific classification
- Domain: Bacteria
- Kingdom: Bacillati
- Phylum: Actinomycetota
- Class: Actinomycetes
- Order: Streptomycetales
- Family: Streptomycetaceae
- Genus: Streptomyces
- Species: S. mordarskii

Binomial name
- Streptomyces mordarskii Kumar and Goodfellow 2008

Type strain
- ATCC 10976, CECT 3137, DSM 40771, DSMZ 40771, ETH 10205, ETH 13081, HMGB B 941, HUT-6026, ICMP 496, IFM 1100, IFO 3192, IMET 41368, IMRU 3591, JCM 4140, JCM 5052, KCTC 9029, LBG A 3042, NBIMCC 875, NBRC 3192, NRRL B-1346, RIA 99, Waksman 3591

Species of bacterium

Streptomyces mordarskii is a bacterium species from the genus of Streptomyces.

== See also ==
- List of Streptomyces species
