= Streptomyces echinoruber =

Scientific classification
- Domain: Bacteria
- Kingdom: Bacillati
- Phylum: Actinomycetota
- Class: Actinomycetes
- Order: Streptomycetales
- Family: Streptomycetaceae
- Genus: Streptomyces
- Species: S. echinoruber

Binomial name
- Streptomyces echinoruber Palleroni et al. 1981

Type strain
- AS 4.1707, BCRC 16859, CCRC 16859, CGMCC 4.1707, DSM 41696, IFO 14238, JCM 5016, KCC S-1016, KCCM 12611, KCCS-1016, KCTC 9725, KCTC 9776, NBRC 14238, NCIMB 12831, NRRL 8144, X-14077

Species of bacterium

Streptomyces echinoruber is a bacterium species from the genus of Streptomyces which was isolated from soil in Argentina. Streptomyces echinoruber produces the red pigment rubrolone.

== See also ==
- List of Streptomyces species
