= Streptomyces glaucosporus =

Scientific classification
- Domain: Bacteria
- Kingdom: Bacillati
- Phylum: Actinomycetota
- Class: Actinomycetia
- Order: Streptomycetales
- Family: Streptomycetaceae
- Genus: Streptomyces
- Species: S. glaucosporus

Binomial name
- Streptomyces glaucosporus (ex Krassilnikov et al. 1968) Agre 1986

Type strain
- ATCC 25183, CGMCC 4.1943, DSM 41689, IFO 15416, INA G-72, INMI 2979, JCM 6921, LMG 19907, NBRC 103021, NBRC 15416, NRRL B-24300, VKM Ac-1763

Synonyms
- "Actinomyces glaucosporus" Krassilnikov et al. 1968

Species of bacterium

Streptomyces glaucosporus is a bacterium species from the genus of Streptomyces which has been isolated from soil.

== See also ==
- List of Streptomyces species
