= Streptomyces thermoalcalitolerans =

Scientific classification
- Domain: Bacteria
- Kingdom: Bacillati
- Phylum: Actinomycetota
- Class: Actinomycetes
- Order: Streptomycetales
- Family: Streptomycetaceae
- Genus: Streptomyces
- Species: S. thermoalcalitolerans

Binomial name
- Streptomyces thermoalcalitolerans Kim et al. 1999

Type strain
- CIP 109044, DSM 41741, Goodfellow TA56, IFO 16322, JCM 10673, KCTC 9936, LMG 19858, NBRC 16322, NRRL B-24315, TA56

Synonyms
- Streptomyces thermalacalitolerans Streptomyces thermoalkalitolerans

Species of bacterium

Streptomyces thermoalcalitolerans is a bacterium species from the genus Streptomyces which has been isolated from garden soil in Yogyakarta on Indonesia.

== See also ==
- List of Streptomyces species
