= Streptomyces sannanensis =

Scientific classification
- Domain: Bacteria
- Kingdom: Bacillati
- Phylum: Actinomycetota
- Class: Actinomycetes
- Order: Streptomycetales
- Family: Streptomycetaceae
- Genus: Streptomyces
- Species: S. sannanensis

Binomial name
- Streptomyces sannanensis Iwasaki et al. 1981

Type strain
- ATCC 31530, DSM 41705, FERM P-4388, FERM-P 4388, FH 2519, IFO 14239, JCM 9651, KC-7038, KCCM 12386, KCTC 9770, NBRC 14239

Species of bacterium

Streptomyces sannanensis is a bacterium species from the genus of Streptomyces which has been isolated from soil from Japan. Streptomyces sannanensis produces istamycin A, isostreptazolin, sannaphenol, sannanine and antibiotics from the sannamycin complex.

== See also ==
- List of Streptomyces species
