= Streptomyces atratus =

Scientific classification
- Domain: Bacteria
- Kingdom: Bacillati
- Phylum: Actinomycetota
- Class: Actinomycetia
- Order: Streptomycetales
- Family: Streptomycetaceae
- Genus: Streptomyces
- Species: S. atratus

Binomial name
- Streptomyces atratus Shibata et al. 1962

Type strain
- 46408, AS 4.1632, ATCC 14046, CBS 364.68, CGMCC 4.1632, DSM 41673, IFO 3897, JCM 3386, NBRC 3897, NRRL B-16927

Species of bacterium

Streptomyces atratus is a bacterium species from the genus Streptomyces which has been isolated from soil in Shimoneda in Japan. Streptomyces atratus produces atramycin A, hydrazidomycins A, hydrazidomycins B, hydrazidomycins C, rufomycins A and rufomycins B.

== See also ==
- List of Streptomyces species
