= Streptomyces lomondensis =

Scientific classification
- Domain: Bacteria
- Kingdom: Bacillati
- Phylum: Actinomycetota
- Class: Actinomycetes
- Order: Streptomycetales
- Family: Streptomycetaceae
- Genus: Streptomyces
- Species: S. lomondensis

Binomial name
- Streptomyces lomondensis Johnson and Dietz 1969

Type strain
- ATCC 25299, BCRC 12208, CCRC 12208, CGMCC 4.1746, DSM 41428, IFO 15426, JCM 4866, KCC S-0866, KCCS-0866, NBRC 15426, NCIB 10094, NCIMB 10094, NRRL 3252, UC 5022

Species of bacterium

Streptomyces lomondensis is a bacterium species from the genus of Streptomyces which has been isolated from soil. Streptomyces lomondensis produces the antibiotic lomofungin.

== See also ==
- List of Streptomyces species
