= Streptomyces glaucus =

Scientific classification
- Domain: Bacteria
- Kingdom: Bacillati
- Phylum: Actinomycetota
- Class: Actinomycetes
- Order: Streptomycetales
- Family: Streptomycetaceae
- Genus: Streptomyces
- Species: S. glaucus

Binomial name
- Streptomyces glaucus (ex Lehmann and Schutze 1912) Agre and Preobrazhenskaya 1986

Type strain
- ATCC 43685, CGMCC 4.1939, DSM 41456, IFO 15417, INA G-86, INMI 2965, JCM 6922, LMG 19902, NBRC 15417, NRRL B-16368, VKM Ac-803

Synonyms
- "Actinomyces glaucus" Lehmann and Schutze 1912

Species of bacterium

Streptomyces glaucus is a species of bacterium in the genus Streptomyces.

== See also ==
- List of Streptomyces species
