= Streptomyces tricolor =

Scientific classification
- Domain: Bacteria
- Kingdom: Bacillati
- Phylum: Actinomycetota
- Class: Actinomycetia
- Order: Streptomycetales
- Family: Streptomycetaceae
- Genus: Streptomyces
- Species: S. tricolor

Binomial name
- Streptomyces tricolor Waksman 1961

Type strain
- CBS 103.21, DSM 41704, ETH 24220, FH 2456, IFO 15461, JCM 5065, KCC S-1065, LMG 20328, MS 1481, NBRC 103112, NBRC 15461, NRRL B-16925, strain CBS 103.21

Synonyms
- Streptomyces roseodiastaticus, Actinomyces roseodiastaticus, Actinomyces tricolor

Species of bacterium

Streptomyces tricolor is a bacterium species from the genus of Streptomyces.

== See also ==
- List of Streptomyces species
