= Streptomyces globosus =

Scientific classification
- Domain: Bacteria
- Kingdom: Bacillati
- Phylum: Actinomycetota
- Class: Actinomycetia
- Order: Streptomycetales
- Family: Streptomycetaceae
- Genus: Streptomyces
- Species: S. globosus

Binomial name
- Streptomyces globosus (Krassilnikov 1941) Waksman 1953 (Approved Lists 1980)

Type strain
- ATCC 14979, CGMCC 4.1969, DI-15, DSM 40815, DSM 41149, IMRU 3736, IMRU 3763, JCM 13859, LMG 19896, NCIMB 12861, NRRL B-2292, WC 3763

Synonyms
- "Actinomyces globosus" Krassilnikov 1941

Species of bacterium

Streptomyces globosus is a bacterium species from the genus of Streptomyces.

== See also ==
- List of Streptomyces species
