= Streptomyces macrosporus =

Scientific classification
- Domain: Bacteria
- Kingdom: Bacillati
- Phylum: Actinomycetota
- Class: Actinomycetes
- Order: Streptomycetales
- Family: Streptomycetaceae
- Genus: Streptomyces
- Species: S. macrosporus

Binomial name
- Streptomyces macrosporus Goodfellow et al. 1988

Type strain
- A1201, ATCC 51533, CGMCC 4.1994, DSM 41449, GoodfellowK44, HUT-6608, IFO 14748, INMI 2892, JCM 6305, K44, Lacey-A1201, NBRC 14748, NCIMB 12473, VKM Ac-777

Species of bacterium

Streptomyces macrosporus is a bacterium species from the genus of Streptomyces which has been isolated from sewage, compost and soil.

== See also ==
- List of Streptomyces species
