= Streptomyces thermoautotrophicus =

Scientific classification
- Domain: Bacteria
- Kingdom: Bacillati
- Phylum: Actinomycetota
- Class: Actinomycetes
- Order: Streptomycetales
- Family: Streptomycetaceae
- Genus: Streptomyces
- Species: S. thermoautotrophicus

Binomial name
- Streptomyces thermoautotrophicus Gadkari et al. 1991

Type strain
- DSM 41605, Gadkari UBT1, LMG 19855, NBRC 101056, UBT1

Species of bacterium

Streptomyces thermoautotrophicus is a thermophilic bacterium species from the genus of Streptomyces. Streptomyces thermoautotrophicus was claimed to be diazotrophic and to produce a new kind of nitrogenase, but new evidence suggests that it can't fix N2 gas.

== See also ==
- List of Streptomyces species
