= Streptomyces hydrogenans =

Scientific classification
- Domain: Bacteria
- Kingdom: Bacillati
- Phylum: Actinomycetota
- Class: Actinomycetia
- Order: Streptomycetales
- Family: Streptomycetaceae
- Genus: Streptomyces
- Species: S. hydrogenans

Binomial name
- Streptomyces hydrogenans Lindner et al. 1958 (Approved Lists 1980)

Type strain
- ATCC 19631; BCRC 11855; CBS 776.72; CCRC 11855; SM 40586; HAMBI 405; IFO 13475; JCM 4771; NBRC 13475; NRRL B-12091; NRRL ISP-5586; RIA 1436; VKM Ac-1919

Species of bacterium

Streptomyces hydrogenans is a species of bacteria from the genus Streptomyces.

== See also ==
- List of Streptomyces species
