= Streptomyces ardesiacus =

Scientific classification
- Domain: Bacteria
- Kingdom: Bacillati
- Phylum: Actinomycetota
- Class: Actinomycetia
- Order: Streptomycetales
- Family: Streptomycetaceae
- Genus: Streptomyces
- Species: S. ardesiacus

Binomial name
- Streptomyces ardesiacus (Baldacci et al. 1955) Komaki and Tamura 2020

Synonyms
- "Actinomyces diastaticus subsp. ardesiacus" Baldacci et al. 1955; "Streptomyces diastaticus subsp. ardesiacus" (Baldacci et al. 1955) Pridham et al. 1958 (Approved Lists 1980)

Species of bacterium

Streptomyces ardesiacus is a bacterium species from the genus of Streptomyces.

== See also ==
- List of Streptomyces species
