= Streptomyces malachitospinus =

Scientific classification
- Domain: Bacteria
- Kingdom: Bacillati
- Phylum: Actinomycetota
- Class: Actinomycetes
- Order: Streptomycetales
- Family: Streptomycetaceae
- Genus: Streptomyces
- Species: S. malachitospinus

Binomial name
- Streptomyces malachitospinus (ex Preobrazhenskaya et al. 1957) Preobrazhenskaya and Terekhova 1986

Type strain
- DSM 41828, INA 316, INMI 217, NBRC 101004, NRRL B-11363, VKM Ac-2514

Synonyms
- Actinomyces malachitospinus Preobrazhenskaya et al. 1957

Species of bacterium

Streptomyces malachitospinus is a bacterium species from the genus of Streptomyces.

== See also ==
- List of Streptomyces species
