= Streptomyces rubrogriseus =

Scientific classification
- Domain: Bacteria
- Kingdom: Bacillati
- Phylum: Actinomycetota
- Class: Actinomycetia
- Order: Streptomycetales
- Family: Streptomycetaceae
- Genus: Streptomyces
- Species: S. rubrogriseus

Binomial name
- Streptomyces rubrogriseus Terekhova 1986

Type strain
- ATCC 43691, CGMCC 4.1762, DSM 41477, IFO 15455, INA 11358, INA 2626, JCM 6927, LMG 20318, NBRC 15455, NRRL B-16375, VKM Ac-1216

Synonyms
- Actinomyces rubrogriseus

Species of bacterium

Streptomyces rubrogriseus is a bacterium species from the genus of Streptomyces.

== See also ==
- List of Streptomyces species
