= Streptomyces thermocoprophilus =

Scientific classification
- Domain: Bacteria
- Kingdom: Bacillati
- Phylum: Actinomycetota
- Class: Actinomycetes
- Order: Streptomycetales
- Family: Streptomycetaceae
- Genus: Streptomyces
- Species: S. thermocoprophilus

Binomial name
- Streptomyces thermocoprophilus Kim et al. 2000

Type strain
- B-19, CGMCC 4.1954, DSM 41700, Goodfellow B-19, JCM 10918, KACC 20183, KCTC 9935, LMG 19857, NBRC 100771, NRRL B-24314

Species of bacterium

Streptomyces thermocoprophilus is a thermophilic bacterium species from the genus of Streptomyces which has been isolated from poultry faeces in Malaysia.

== See also ==
- List of Streptomyces species
