= Streptomyces scopiformis =

Scientific classification
- Domain: Bacteria
- Kingdom: Bacillati
- Phylum: Actinomycetota
- Class: Actinomycetes
- Order: Streptomycetales
- Family: Streptomycetaceae
- Genus: Streptomyces
- Species: S. scopiformis

Binomial name
- Streptomyces scopiformis Li et al. 2002

Type strain
- A25, AS 4.1331, BCRC 16364, CCRC 16364, CGMCC 4.1331, DSM 41825, JCM 12114, Lanoot R-14324, LMG 20251, NBRC 100244, NBRC 200244, R-14324, Zhang A25

Species of bacterium

Streptomyces scopiformis is a bacterium species from the genus of Streptomyces which has been isolated from soil in China.

== See also ==
- List of Streptomyces species
