= Streptomyces cinereospinus =

Scientific classification
- Domain: Bacteria
- Kingdom: Bacillati
- Phylum: Actinomycetota
- Class: Actinomycetes
- Order: Streptomycetales
- Family: Streptomycetaceae
- Genus: Streptomyces
- Species: S. cinereospinus

Binomial name
- Streptomyces cinereospinus Terekhova et al. 1986

Type strain
- AS 4.163, ATCC 43680, BCRC 16855, CCRC 16855, CGMCC 4.1630, DSM 41470, IFO 15397, INA 1719, JCM 6917 NBRC 15397, NRRL B-16361, VKM Ac-1215

Species of bacterium

Streptomyces cinereospinus is a bacterium species from the genus of Streptomyces.

== See also ==
- List of Streptomyces species
