= Streptomyces ferralitis =

Scientific classification
- Domain: Bacteria
- Kingdom: Bacillati
- Phylum: Actinomycetota
- Class: Actinomycetes
- Order: Streptomycetales
- Family: Streptomycetaceae
- Genus: Streptomyces
- Species: S. ferralitis

Binomial name
- Streptomyces ferralitis Saintpierre-Bonaccio et al. 2004

Type strain
- CGMCC 4.1985, DSM 41836, Goodfellow SF0p68, JCM 14344, NCIMB 13954, SFOp68, VTT E-072715

Species of bacterium

Streptomyces ferralitis is a Gram-positive, aerobic bacterium species from the genus of Streptomyces which has been isolated from ultramafic soil in New Caledonia.

== See also ==
- List of Streptomyces species
