= Streptomyces niveoruber =

Scientific classification
- Domain: Bacteria
- Kingdom: Bacillati
- Phylum: Actinomycetota
- Class: Actinomycetes
- Order: Streptomycetales
- Family: Streptomycetaceae
- Genus: Streptomyces
- Species: S. niveoruber

Binomial name
- Streptomyces niveoruber Ettlinger et al. 1958

Type strain
- ATCC 14971, DSM 40638, IFO 15428, IMET 43354, JCM 4234, NRRL B-2724

Synonyms
- Streptomyces niveiruber

Species of bacterium

Streptomyces niveoruber is a bacterium species from the genus of Streptomyces which was isolated from soil from Grimsby in England. Streptomyces niveoruber produces cinerubin.

== See also ==
- List of Streptomyces species
