= Streptomyces carpaticus =

Scientific classification
- Domain: Bacteria
- Kingdom: Bacillati
- Phylum: Actinomycetota
- Class: Actinomycetes
- Order: Streptomycetales
- Family: Streptomycetaceae
- Genus: Streptomyces
- Species: S. carpaticus

Binomial name
- Streptomyces carpaticus Maximova and Terekhova 1986

Type strain
- AS 4.1621, ATCC 43678, BCRC 16853, CCRC 16853, CGMCC 4.1621, DSM 41468, IFO 15390, INA 8851, JCM 6915, NBRC 15390, NRRL B-16359, VKM Ac-1211

Species of bacterium

Streptomyces carpaticus is a bacterium species from the genus of Streptomyces.

== See also ==
- List of Streptomyces species
