= Streptomyces thermogriseus =

Scientific classification
- Domain: Bacteria
- Kingdom: Bacillati
- Phylum: Actinomycetota
- Class: Actinomycetes
- Order: Streptomycetales
- Family: Streptomycetaceae
- Genus: Streptomyces
- Species: S. thermogriseus

Binomial name
- Streptomyces thermogriseus Xu et al. 1998

Type strain
- CCTCC AA97014, CIP 105834, DSM 41756, JCM 11269, NBRC 100772, NRRL B-24322, TCC AA97014, Y-14046

Species of bacterium

Streptomyces thermogriseus is a thermophilic bacterium species from the genus of Streptomyces which has been isolated from a hot spring in Eryuan in the Yunnan Province in China.

== See also ==
- List of Streptomyces species
