= Streptomyces wellingtoniae =

Scientific classification
- Domain: Bacteria
- Kingdom: Bacillati
- Phylum: Actinomycetota
- Class: Actinomycetes
- Order: Streptomycetales
- Family: Streptomycetaceae
- Genus: Streptomyces
- Species: S. wellingtoniae

Binomial name
- Streptomyces wellingtoniae Kumar and Goodfellow 2010

Type strain
- CECT 3136, Chas. Pfizer Co. FD-11369, DSM 40632, ETH 15973, NRRL B-1503

Species of bacterium

Streptomyces wellingtoniae is a bacterium species from the genus of Streptomyces. Streptomyces wellingtoniae produces hygroscopin A, hygroscopin B and hygroscopin C.

== See also ==
- List of Streptomyces species
