= Streptomyces fulvorobeus =

Scientific classification
- Domain: Bacteria
- Kingdom: Bacillati
- Phylum: Actinomycetota
- Class: Actinomycetes
- Order: Streptomycetales
- Family: Streptomycetaceae
- Genus: Streptomyces
- Species: S. fulvorobeus

Binomial name
- Streptomyces fulvorobeus Vinogradova and Preobrazhenskaya 1986

Type strain
- DSM 41455, IFO 15897, INMI 34-280, JCM 9090, LMG 19901, NBRC 15897, NRRL B-24329, VKM 158, VKM Ac-158, VTT E-072709

Species of bacterium

Streptomyces fulvorobeus is a bacterium species from the genus of Streptomyces.

== See also ==
- List of Streptomyces species
