= Streptomyces koyangensis =

Scientific classification
- Domain: Bacteria
- Kingdom: Bacillati
- Phylum: Actinomycetota
- Class: Actinomycetia
- Order: Streptomycetales
- Family: Streptomycetaceae
- Genus: Streptomyces
- Species: S. koyangensis

Binomial name
- Streptomyces koyangensis Lee et al. 2005

Type strain
- DSM 41864, JCM 14915, KCCM 10555, NBRC 100598, VK-A60

Species of bacterium

Streptomyces koyangensis is a bacterium species from the genus of Streptomyces which has been isolated from radish soil in Koyang in Korea. Streptomyces koyangensis produces antifungal 4-phenyl-3-butenoic acid.

== See also ==
- List of Streptomyces species
