= Streptomyces curacoi =

Scientific classification
- Domain: Bacteria
- Kingdom: Bacillati
- Phylum: Actinomycetota
- Class: Actinomycetia
- Order: Streptomycetales
- Family: Streptomycetaceae
- Genus: Streptomyces
- Species: S. curacoi

Binomial name
- Streptomyces curacoi Cataldi 1963 (Approved Lists 1980)

Type strain
- 5828; ATCC 13385; ATCC 19745; CBS 484.68; DSM 40107; IFO 12761; JCM 4219; JCM 4573; NBRC 12761; NRRL ISP-5107; RIA 1026; SC 3604; UNIQEM 132

Species of bacterium

Streptomyces curacoi is an actinobacterium species in the genus Streptomyces.
