= Streptomyces labedae =

Scientific classification
- Domain: Bacteria
- Kingdom: Bacillati
- Phylum: Actinomycetota
- Class: Actinomycetes
- Order: Streptomycetales
- Family: Streptomycetaceae
- Genus: Streptomyces
- Species: S. labedae

Binomial name
- Streptomyces labedae Lacey 1987

Type strain
- A-24, CBS 525.64, CGMCC 4.1916, DSM 41446, IFO 15864, IMRU 3737, ISP 5059, JCM 9381, NBRC 15864, NRRL B-5616, NRRL-ISP 5059

Species of bacterium

Streptomyces labedae is a bacterium species from the genus of Streptomyces which has been isolated from soil.

== See also ==
- List of Streptomyces species
