= Streptomyces pharmamarensis =

Scientific classification
- Domain: Bacteria
- Kingdom: Bacillati
- Phylum: Actinomycetota
- Class: Actinomycetia
- Order: Streptomycetales
- Family: Streptomycetaceae
- Genus: Streptomyces
- Species: S. pharmamarensis

Binomial name
- Streptomyces pharmamarensis Carro et al. 2012

Type strain
- CECT 7841, DSM 42032, PM267

Synonyms
- Streptomyces pharmamensis

Species of bacterium

Streptomyces pharmamarensis is a Gram-positive bacterium species from the genus of Streptomyces which has been isolated from marine sediment at the Mediterranean Sea near the Italian island of Sicily.

== See also ==
- List of Streptomyces species
