= Streptomyces olivicoloratus =

Scientific classification
- Domain: Bacteria
- Kingdom: Bacillati
- Phylum: Actinomycetota
- Class: Actinomycetia
- Order: Streptomycetales
- Family: Streptomycetaceae
- Genus: Streptomyces
- Species: S. olivicoloratus

Binomial name
- Streptomyces olivicoloratus Nguyen and Kim 2015

Type strain
- KACC 18227, KEMB 9005-210, NBRC 110901, T13

Species of bacterium

Streptomyces olivicoloratus is a bacterium species from the genus of Streptomyces which has been isolated from forest soil in Jeollabuk-do in Korea. Streptomyces olivicoloratus produces antibiotics.

== See also ==
- List of Streptomyces species
