= Streptomyces harbinensis =

Scientific classification
- Domain: Bacteria
- Kingdom: Bacillati
- Phylum: Actinomycetota
- Class: Actinomycetia
- Order: Streptomycetales
- Family: Streptomycetaceae
- Genus: Streptomyces
- Species: S. harbinensis

Binomial name
- Streptomyces harbinensis Liu et al. 2013

Type strain
- CGMCC 4.7047, DSM 42076, NEAU-Da3

Species of bacterium

Streptomyces harbinensis is a bacterium species from the genus of Streptomyces which has been isolated from roots of the soybean Glycine max in Harbin in the Heilongjiang province in China. Streptomyces harbinensis produces ikarugamycin

== See also ==
- List of Streptomyces species
