= Streptomyces solisilvae =

Scientific classification
- Domain: Bacteria
- Kingdom: Bacillati
- Phylum: Actinomycetota
- Class: Actinomycetia
- Order: Streptomycetales
- Family: Streptomycetaceae
- Genus: Streptomyces
- Species: S. solisilvae

Binomial name
- Streptomyces solisilvae Zhou et al. 2017

Type strain
- CCTCC AA 2016045, KCTC 39905, HNM0141

Synonyms
- Streptomyces liangyuanensis

Species of bacterium

Streptomyces solisilvae is a bacterium species from the genus of Streptomyces which has been isolated from soil from a tropical forest on the Bawangling mountain in China.

== See also ==
- List of Streptomyces species
