= Streptomyces ovatisporus =

Scientific classification
- Domain: Bacteria
- Kingdom: Bacillati
- Phylum: Actinomycetota
- Class: Actinomycetes
- Order: Streptomycetales
- Family: Streptomycetaceae
- Genus: Streptomyces
- Species: S. ovatisporus

Binomial name
- Streptomyces ovatisporus Veyisoglu et al. 2016

Type strain
- CGMCC 4.7357, DSM 42103, KCTC 29206, S4702

Species of bacterium

Streptomyces ovatisporus is a Gram-positive bacterium species from the genus of Streptomyces which has been isolated from marine sediments from the coast of the Black Sea in Turkey.

== See also ==
- List of Streptomyces species
