= Streptomyces yeochonensis =

Scientific classification
- Domain: Bacteria
- Kingdom: Bacillati
- Phylum: Actinomycetota
- Class: Actinomycetes
- Order: Streptomycetales
- Family: Streptomycetaceae
- Genus: Streptomyces
- Species: S. yeochonensis

Binomial name
- Streptomyces yeochonensis Kim et al. 2004

Type strain
- CN732, DSM 41868, IMSNU 50114, JCM 12366, KCTC 9926, NBRC 100782, NRRL B-24245

Species of bacterium

Streptomyces yeochonensis is a bacterium species from the genus of Streptomyces which has been isolated from acidic soil in Korea.

== See also ==
- List of Streptomyces species
