= Streptomyces phaeoluteigriseus =

Scientific classification
- Domain: Bacteria
- Kingdom: Bacillati
- Phylum: Actinomycetota
- Class: Actinomycetes
- Order: Streptomycetales
- Family: Streptomycetaceae
- Genus: Streptomyces
- Species: S. phaeoluteigriseus

Binomial name
- Streptomyces phaeoluteigriseus Goodfellow et al. 2008

Type strain
- ATCC 19933, DSM 41896, INA 3109, ISP 5182, NRRL ISP-5182

Species of bacterium

Streptomyces phaeoluteigriseus is a bacterium species from the genus of Streptomyces which has been isolated from soil.

== See also ==
- List of Streptomyces species
