= Streptomyces chiangmaiensis =

Scientific classification
- Domain: Bacteria
- Kingdom: Bacillati
- Phylum: Actinomycetota
- Class: Actinomycetia
- Order: Streptomycetales
- Family: Streptomycetaceae
- Genus: Streptomyces
- Species: S. chiangmaiensis

Binomial name
- Streptomyces chiangmaiensis Promnuan et al. 2013

Type strain
- JCM 16577, TA4-1, TISTR 1981

Species of bacterium

Streptomyces chiangmaiensis is a bacterium species from the genus of Streptomyces which has been isolated from the bee Tetragonilla collina in the Chiang Mai Province in Thailand.

== See also ==
- List of Streptomyces species
