= Streptomyces albidochromogenes =

Scientific classification
- Domain: Bacteria
- Kingdom: Bacillati
- Phylum: Actinomycetota
- Class: Actinomycetia
- Order: Streptomycetales
- Family: Streptomycetaceae
- Genus: Streptomyces
- Species: S. albidochromogenes

Binomial name
- Streptomyces albidochromogenes Preobrazhenskaya 1986

Type strain
- AS 4.1863, CGMCC 4.1863, DSM 41800, INA 11792, JCM 13858, NBRC 101003, VKM Ac-2282

Species of bacterium

Streptomyces albidochromogenes is a bacterium species from the genus Streptomyces.

== See also ==
- List of Streptomyces species
