= Streptomyces nanhaiensis =

Scientific classification
- Domain: Bacteria
- Kingdom: Bacillati
- Phylum: Actinomycetota
- Class: Actinomycetia
- Order: Streptomycetales
- Family: Streptomycetaceae
- Genus: Streptomyces
- Species: S. nanhaiensis

Binomial name
- Streptomyces nanhaiensis Tian et al. 2012

Type strain
- CCTCC AA 208007, DSM 41926, KCTC 19401, SCSIO 01248

Species of bacterium

Streptomyces nanhaiensis is a bacterium species from the genus of Streptomyces which has been isolated from deep sea sediments from the northern South China Sea in China.

== See also ==
- List of Streptomyces species
