= Streptomyces herbaceus =

Scientific classification
- Domain: Bacteria
- Kingdom: Bacillati
- Phylum: Actinomycetota
- Class: Actinomycetia
- Order: Streptomycetales
- Family: Streptomycetaceae
- Genus: Streptomyces
- Species: S. herbaceus

Binomial name
- Streptomyces herbaceus Kim et al. 2012

Type strain
- CGMCC 4.5797, KACC 21001, BK119

Species of bacterium

Streptomyces herbaceus is a bacterium species from the genus of Streptomyces which has been isolated from soil of a hay meadow from the Cockle Park Experimental Farm in Northumberland in the United Kingdom.

== See also ==
- List of Streptomyces species
