= Streptomyces krungchingensis =

Scientific classification
- Domain: Bacteria
- Kingdom: Bacillati
- Phylum: Actinomycetota
- Class: Actinomycetia
- Order: Streptomycetales
- Family: Streptomycetaceae
- Genus: Streptomyces
- Species: S. krungchingensis

Binomial name
- Streptomyces krungchingensis Sripreechasak et al. 2017

Type strain
- KCTC 29503, NBRC 110087, KC-035, TISTR 2402

Species of bacterium

Streptomyces krungchingensis is a bacterium species from the genus of Streptomyces which has been isolated from soil from the Krung Ching Waterfall National Park in Thailand.

== See also ==
- List of Streptomyces species
