= Streptomyces himastatinicus =

Scientific classification
- Domain: Bacteria
- Kingdom: Bacillati
- Phylum: Actinomycetota
- Class: Actinomycetes
- Order: Streptomycetales
- Family: Streptomycetaceae
- Genus: Streptomyces
- Species: S. himastatinicus

Binomial name
- Streptomyces himastatinicus Kumar and Goodfellow 2008

Type strain
- ATCC 53653, Bu3730T, C39108, DSM 41914, P210-51, P210-51]#

Species of bacterium

Streptomyces himastatinicus is a bacterium species from the genus of Streptomyces. Streptomyces himastatinicus produces himastatin.

== See also ==
- List of Streptomyces species
