= Streptomyces kaempferi =

Scientific classification
- Domain: Bacteria
- Kingdom: Bacillati
- Phylum: Actinomycetota
- Class: Actinomycetia
- Order: Streptomycetales
- Family: Streptomycetaceae
- Genus: Streptomyces
- Species: S. kaempferi

Binomial name
- Streptomyces kaempferi Santhanam et al. 2013

Type strain
- CGMCC 4.7020, KACC 15428, I37

Species of bacterium

Streptomyces kaempferi is a bacterium species from the genus of Streptomyces which has been isolated from hay meadow soil from the Cockle Park Experimental Farm in Northumberland in the United Kingdom.

== See also ==
- List of Streptomyces species
