= Streptomyces nanshensis =

Scientific classification
- Domain: Bacteria
- Kingdom: Bacillati
- Phylum: Actinomycetota
- Class: Actinomycetia
- Order: Streptomycetales
- Family: Streptomycetaceae
- Genus: Streptomyces
- Species: S. nanshensis

Binomial name
- Streptomyces nanshensis Tian et al. 2009

Type strain
- CCTCC AA 208005, JCM 16226, KCTC 19400, SCSIO 01066

Species of bacterium

Streptomyces nanshensis is a bacterium species from the genus of Streptomyces which has been isolated from marine sediments from the South China Sea near the Nansha Islands in China.

== See also ==
- List of Streptomyces species
