= Streptomyces synnematoformans =

Scientific classification
- Domain: Bacteria
- Kingdom: Bacillati
- Phylum: Actinomycetota
- Class: Actinomycetes
- Order: Streptomycetales
- Family: Streptomycetaceae
- Genus: Streptomyces
- Species: S. synnematoformans

Binomial name
- Streptomyces synnematoformans Hozzein and Goodfellow 2007

Type strain
- CGMCC 4.2055, CIP 109799, DSM 41902, JCM 15481, S155

Species of bacterium

Streptomyces synnematoformans is a bacterium species from the genus of Streptomyces which has been isolated from soil from a sand dune in Egypt.

== See also ==
- List of Streptomyces species
