= Streptomyces fabae =

Scientific classification
- Domain: Bacteria
- Kingdom: Bacillati
- Phylum: Actinomycetota
- Class: Actinomycetes
- Order: Streptomycetales
- Family: Streptomycetaceae
- Genus: Streptomyces
- Species: S. fabae

Binomial name
- Streptomyces fabae Nguyen et al. 2015

Type strain
- T66

Species of bacterium

Streptomyces fabae is a bacterium species from the genus of Streptomyces which has been isolated from rhizosphere soil from the soybean (Glycine max) from Gyeonggi Siheung Sorae in Korea. Streptomyces fabae has anti-microbiology activity.

== See also ==
- List of Streptomyces species
