= Streptomyces asenjonii =

Scientific classification
- Domain: Bacteria
- Kingdom: Bacillati
- Phylum: Actinomycetota
- Class: Actinomycetia
- Order: Streptomycetales
- Family: Streptomycetaceae
- Genus: Streptomyces
- Species: S. asenjonii

Binomial name
- Streptomyces asenjonii Goodfellow et al. 2017

Type strain
- NCIMB 15082, NRRL B-65050, KNN 35.1b, KNN 35.2b

Species of bacterium

Streptomyces asenjonii is a bacterium species from the genus Streptomyces which has been isolated from hyper-arid soil from the Atacama Desert.

== See also ==
- List of Streptomyces species
