= Streptomyces osmaniensis =

Scientific classification
- Domain: Bacteria
- Kingdom: Bacillati
- Phylum: Actinomycetota
- Class: Actinomycetes
- Order: Streptomycetales
- Family: Streptomycetaceae
- Genus: Streptomyces
- Species: S. osmaniensis

Binomial name
- Streptomyces osmaniensis Reddy et al. 2010

Type strain
- CCTCC AA209025, JCM 17656, OU-63, PCM 2690

Species of bacterium

Streptomyces osmaniensis is a bacterium species from the genus of Streptomyces which has been isolated from garden soil at the Osmania University in Hyderabad in India.

== See also ==
- List of Streptomyces species
