= Streptomyces incanus =

Scientific classification
- Domain: Bacteria
- Kingdom: Bacillati
- Phylum: Actinomycetota
- Class: Actinomycetia
- Order: Streptomycetales
- Family: Streptomycetaceae
- Genus: Streptomyces
- Species: S. incanus

Binomial name
- Streptomyces incanus Kim et al. 2012

Type strain
- BK128, CGMCC 4.5799, KACC 21002

Species of bacterium

Streptomyces incanus is a bacterium species from the genus of Streptomyces which has been isolated from soil of a hay meadow from the Cockle Park Experimental Farm in Northumberland in the United Kingdom.

== See also ==
- List of Streptomyces species
