= Streptomyces bryophytorum =

Scientific classification
- Domain: Bacteria
- Kingdom: Bacillati
- Phylum: Actinomycetota
- Class: Actinomycetia
- Order: Streptomycetales
- Family: Streptomycetaceae
- Genus: Streptomyces
- Species: S. bryophytorum

Binomial name
- Streptomyces bryophytorum Li et al. 2016

Type strain
- CGMCC 4.7151, DSM 42138, NEAU-HZ10, NEAU-HZ10

Species of bacterium

Streptomyces bryophytorum is a bacterium species from the genus of Streptomyces which has been isolated from moss from Wuchang in China.

== See also ==
- List of Streptomyces species
