= Streptomyces karpasiensis =

Scientific classification
- Domain: Bacteria
- Kingdom: Bacillati
- Phylum: Actinomycetota
- Class: Actinomycetia
- Order: Streptomycetales
- Family: Streptomycetaceae
- Genus: Streptomyces
- Species: S. karpasiensis

Binomial name
- Streptomyces karpasiensis Veyisoglu et al. 2014

Type strain
- DSM 42068, K413, KCTC 29096

Species of bacterium

Streptomyces karpasiensis is a bacterium species from the genus of Streptomyces which has been isolated from soil from the Karpaz National Park in Magusa in Cyprus.

== See also ==
- List of Streptomyces species
