= Streptomyces pluripotens =

Scientific classification
- Domain: Bacteria
- Kingdom: Bacillati
- Phylum: Actinomycetota
- Class: Actinomycetia
- Order: Streptomycetales
- Family: Streptomycetaceae
- Genus: Streptomyces
- Species: S. pluripotens

Binomial name
- Streptomyces pluripotens Lee et al. 2014

Type strain
- DSM 42140, MCCC 1K00252, MUSC 135

Species of bacterium

Streptomyces pluripotens is a bacterium species from the genus of Streptomyces which has been isolated from mangrove soil from the Tanjung Lumpur river in Malaysia.

== See also ==
- List of Streptomyces species
