= Streptomyces brevispora =

Scientific classification
- Domain: Bacteria
- Kingdom: Bacillati
- Phylum: Actinomycetota
- Class: Actinomycetia
- Order: Streptomycetales
- Family: Streptomycetaceae
- Genus: Streptomyces
- Species: S. brevispora

Binomial name
- Streptomyces brevispora Zucchi et al. 2012

Type strain
- KACC 21093, NCIMB 14702, BK160

Species of bacterium

Streptomyces brevispora is a bacterium species from the genus Streptomyces which has been isolated from soil from the Cockle Park Experimental Farm in Northumberland in the United Kingdom.

== See also ==
- List of Streptomyces species
