= Streptomyces mayteni =

Scientific classification
- Domain: Bacteria
- Kingdom: Bacillati
- Phylum: Actinomycetota
- Class: Actinomycetes
- Order: Streptomycetales
- Family: Streptomycetaceae
- Genus: Streptomyces
- Species: S. mayteni

Binomial name
- Streptomyces mayteni Chen et al. 2009

Type strain
- CCTCC AA 207005, JCM 16957, KCTC 19383, YIM 60475

Species of bacterium

Streptomyces mayteni is a bacterium species from the genus of Streptomyces which has been isolated from roots from the plant Maytenus austroyunnanensis.

== See also ==
- List of Streptomyces species
