= Streptomyces auratus =

Scientific classification
- Domain: Bacteria
- Kingdom: Bacillati
- Phylum: Actinomycetota
- Class: Actinomycetes
- Order: Streptomycetales
- Family: Streptomycetaceae
- Genus: Streptomyces
- Species: S. auratus

Binomial name
- Streptomyces auratus Goodfellow et al. 2008

Type strain
- DSM 41897, NRRL 8097, NRRL B-8097

Species of bacterium

Streptomyces auratus is a bacterium species from the genus Streptomyces. Streptomyces auratus produces neophoslactomycin A, lysolipins I and lysolipins X.

== See also ==
- List of Streptomyces species
