= Streptomyces hoynatensis =

Scientific classification
- Domain: Bacteria
- Kingdom: Bacillati
- Phylum: Actinomycetota
- Class: Actinomycetia
- Order: Streptomycetales
- Family: Streptomycetaceae
- Genus: Streptomyces
- Species: S. hoynatensis

Binomial name
- Streptomyces hoynatensis Veyisoglu and Sahin 2014

Type strain
- DSM 42069, KCTC 29097, S1412

Species of bacterium

Streptomyces hoynatensis is a bacterium species from the genus of Streptomyces which has been isolated from marine sediment from the Black Sea in Turkey.

== See also ==
- List of Streptomyces species
