= Streptomyces africanus =

Scientific classification
- Domain: Bacteria
- Kingdom: Bacillati
- Phylum: Actinomycetota
- Class: Actinomycetia
- Order: Streptomycetales
- Family: Streptomycetaceae
- Genus: Streptomyces
- Species: S. africanus

Binomial name
- Streptomyces africanus Meyers et al. 2004

Type strain
- CPJVR-H, DSM 41829, JCM 13243, NBRC 101005, NRRL B-24243

Species of bacterium

Streptomyces africanus is a bacterium species from the genus of Streptomyces which has been isolated from soil in Cape Town in South Africa.

== See also ==
- List of Streptomyces species
