= Streptomyces fildesensis =

Scientific classification
- Domain: Bacteria
- Kingdom: Bacillati
- Phylum: Actinomycetota
- Class: Actinomycetes
- Order: Streptomycetales
- Family: Streptomycetaceae
- Genus: Streptomyces
- Species: S. fildesensis

Binomial name
- Streptomyces fildesensis Li et al. 2012

Type strain
- CGMCC 4.5735, DSM 41987, GW25-5, NRRL B-24828, YIM 93602

Species of bacterium

Streptomyces fildesensis is a bacterium species from the genus of Streptomyces which has been isolated from antarctic soil.

== See also ==
- List of Streptomyces species
