= Streptomyces shenzhenensis =

Scientific classification
- Domain: Bacteria
- Kingdom: Bacillati
- Phylum: Actinomycetota
- Class: Actinomycetia
- Order: Streptomycetales
- Family: Streptomycetaceae
- Genus: Streptomyces
- Species: S. shenzhenensis

Binomial name
- Streptomyces shenzhenensis Hu et al. 2012

Type strain
- 172115, CCTCC AA 2011001, DSM 42034

Species of bacterium

Streptomyces shenzhenensis is a bacterium species from the genus of Streptomyces which has been isolated from mangrove soil in Shenzhen China.

== See also ==
- List of Streptomyces species
