= Streptomyces yangpuensis =

Scientific classification
- Domain: Bacteria
- Kingdom: Bacillati
- Phylum: Actinomycetota
- Class: Actinomycetia
- Order: Streptomycetales
- Family: Streptomycetaceae
- Genus: Streptomyces
- Species: S. yangpuensis

Binomial name
- Streptomyces yangpuensis Tang et al. 2016

Type strain
- CGMCC 4.7256, DSM 100336, fd2-tb

Species of bacterium

Streptomyces yangpuensis is a Gram-positive bacterium species from the genus of Streptomyces which has been isolated from soil in Shanghai in China.

== See also ==
- List of Streptomyces species
