= Streptomyces flavidovirens =

Scientific classification
- Domain: Bacteria
- Kingdom: Bacillati
- Phylum: Actinomycetota
- Class: Actinomycetia
- Order: Streptomycetales
- Family: Streptomycetaceae
- Genus: Streptomyces
- Species: S. flavidovirens

Binomial name
- Streptomyces flavidovirens (Kudrina 1957) Pridham et al. 1958 (Approved Lists 1980)

Synonyms
- "Actinomyces flavidovirens" Kudrina 1957

Species of bacteria

Streptomyces flavidovirens is a bacterium species from the genus of Streptomyces.

== See also ==
- List of Streptomyces species
