= Streptomyces spongiicola =

Scientific classification
- Domain: Bacteria
- Kingdom: Bacillati
- Phylum: Actinomycetota
- Class: Actinomycetia
- Order: Streptomycetales
- Family: Streptomycetaceae
- Genus: Streptomyces
- Species: S. spongiicola

Binomial name
- Streptomyces spongiicola Huang et al. 2016

Type strain
- CCTCC AA 2015018, KCTC 39604, HNM0071

Species of bacterium

Streptomyces spongiicola is a bacterium species from the genus of Streptomyces which has been isolated from a sponge from the coast of Sanya City in China.

== See also ==
- List of Streptomyces species
