= Streptomyces araujoniae =

Scientific classification
- Domain: Bacteria
- Kingdom: Bacillati
- Phylum: Actinomycetota
- Class: Actinomycetia
- Order: Streptomycetales
- Family: Streptomycetaceae
- Genus: Streptomyces
- Species: S. araujoniae

Binomial name
- Streptomyces araujoniae Da Silva et al. 2014

Type strain
- ASBV-1, CBMAI 1465, CCMA 894, NRRL B-24922

Species of bacterium

Streptomyces araujoniae is a bacterium species from the genus of Streptomyces which has been isolated from a potato tubercle.

== See also ==
- List of Streptomyces species
