= Streptomyces sparsus =

Scientific classification
- Domain: Bacteria
- Kingdom: Bacillati
- Phylum: Actinomycetota
- Class: Actinomycetia
- Order: Streptomycetales
- Family: Streptomycetaceae
- Genus: Streptomyces
- Species: S. sparsus

Binomial name
- Streptomyces sparsus Jiang et al. 2011

Type strain
- CCTCC AA204019, DSM 41858, YIM 90018

Species of bacterium

Streptomyces sparsus is a bacterium species from the genus of Streptomyces which has been isolated from saline and alkaline soil in the Qinghai Province in China.

== See also ==
- List of Streptomyces species
