= Streptomyces aqsuensis =

Scientific classification
- Domain: Bacteria
- Kingdom: Bacillati
- Phylum: Actinomycetota
- Class: Actinomycetes
- Order: Streptomycetales
- Family: Streptomycetaceae
- Genus: Streptomyces
- Species: S. aqsuensis

Binomial name
- Streptomyces aqsuensis Wang et al. 2018

Type strain
- TRM46399

Species of bacterium

Streptomyces aqsuensis is a Gram-positive and aerobic bacterium species from the genus of Streptomyces which has been isolated from ditch sediments from the Xinjiang Province in China.

== See also ==
- List of Streptomyces species
