= Streptomyces monomycini =

Scientific classification
- Domain: Bacteria
- Kingdom: Bacillati
- Phylum: Actinomycetota
- Class: Actinomycetes
- Order: Streptomycetales
- Family: Streptomycetaceae
- Genus: Streptomyces
- Species: S. monomycini

Binomial name
- Streptomyces monomycini Gause and Terekhova 1986

Type strain
- DSM 41801, INA 1465, JCM 9768, NBRC 100769, NRRL B-24309, VKM Ac-2283

Species of bacterium

Streptomyces monomycini is a bacterium species from the genus of Streptomyces.

== See also ==
- List of Streptomyces species
