= Streptomyces umbrinus =

Scientific classification
- Domain: Bacteria
- Kingdom: Bacillati
- Phylum: Actinomycetota
- Class: Actinomycetes
- Order: Streptomycetales
- Family: Streptomycetaceae
- Genus: Streptomyces
- Species: S. umbrinus

Binomial name
- Streptomyces umbrinus Pridham et al. 1958

Synonyms
- Actinomyces umbrinus

Species of bacterium

Streptomyces umbrinus is a bacterium species from the genus of Streptomyces which has been isolated from soil in Russia. Streptomyces umbrinus produces diumycins.

== See also ==
- List of Streptomyces species
