= Streptomyces odonnellii =

Scientific classification
- Domain: Bacteria
- Kingdom: Bacillati
- Phylum: Actinomycetota
- Class: Actinomycetia
- Order: Streptomycetales
- Family: Streptomycetaceae
- Genus: Streptomyces
- Species: S. odonnellii

Binomial name
- Streptomyces odonnellii Pereira et al. 2017

Type strain
- DSM 41949, IMPPG 594, NRRL B-24891, strain 594

Species of bacterium

Streptomyces odonnellii is a bacterium species from the genus of Streptomyces which has been isolated from soil from Brazil.

== See also ==
- List of Streptomyces species
