= Streptomyces polymachus =

Scientific classification
- Domain: Bacteria
- Kingdom: Bacillati
- Phylum: Actinomycetota
- Class: Actinomycetia
- Order: Streptomycetales
- Family: Streptomycetaceae
- Genus: Streptomyces
- Species: S. polymachus

Binomial name
- Streptomyces polymachus Nguyen and Kim 2015

Species of bacterium

Streptomyces polymachus is a bacterium species from the genus of Streptomyces which has been isolated from soil from the Bongnae Falls in South Korea. Streptomyces polymachus has antimicrobial and antifungal activity.

== See also ==
- List of Streptomyces species
