= Streptomyces similanensis =

Scientific classification
- Domain: Bacteria
- Kingdom: Bacillati
- Phylum: Actinomycetota
- Class: Actinomycetia
- Order: Streptomycetales
- Family: Streptomycetaceae
- Genus: Streptomyces
- Species: S. similanensis

Binomial name
- Streptomyces similanensis Sripreechasak et al. 2016

Type strain
- NBRC 108798, PCU 329, KC-106, TISTR 2104

Species of bacterium

Streptomyces similanensis is a bacterium species from the genus of Streptomyces which has been isolated from soil in Thailand.

== See also ==
- List of Streptomyces species
