= Streptomyces dangxiongensis =

Scientific classification
- Domain: Bacteria
- Kingdom: Bacillati
- Phylum: Actinomycetota
- Class: Actinomycetia
- Order: Streptomycetales
- Family: Streptomycetaceae
- Genus: Streptomyces
- Species: S. dangxiongensis

Binomial name
- Streptomyces dangxiongensis Zhang et al. 2019

Type strain
- Z022

Species of bacterium

Streptomyces dangxiongensis is a bacterium species from the genus of Streptomyces which has been isolated from soil from the Qinghai-Tibet Plateau in China.

== See also ==
- List of Streptomyces species
