= Streptomyces oryzae =

Scientific classification
- Domain: Bacteria
- Kingdom: Bacillati
- Phylum: Actinomycetota
- Class: Actinomycetia
- Order: Streptomycetales
- Family: Streptomycetaceae
- Genus: Streptomyces
- Species: S. oryzae

Binomial name
- Streptomyces oryzae Sharma et al. 2016

Type strain
- BCC 60400, NBRC 109761, S16-07

Species of bacterium

Streptomyces oryzae is a bacterium species from the genus of Streptomyces which has been isolated from the stem of a rice plant Oryza sativa.

== See also ==
- List of Streptomyces species
