= Streptomyces roseicoloratus =

Scientific classification
- Domain: Bacteria
- Kingdom: Bacillati
- Phylum: Actinomycetota
- Class: Actinomycetia
- Order: Streptomycetales
- Family: Streptomycetaceae
- Genus: Streptomyces
- Species: S. roseicoloratus

Binomial name
- Streptomyces roseicoloratus Zhang et al. 2020

Type strain
- TRM 44457

Species of bacterium

Streptomyces roseicoloratus is a bacterium species from the genus of Streptomyces which has been isolated from soil from a cotton field from Xinjiang in China.

== See also ==
- List of Streptomyces species
