= Streptomyces durbertensis =

Scientific classification
- Domain: Bacteria
- Kingdom: Bacillati
- Phylum: Actinomycetota
- Class: Actinomycetia
- Order: Streptomycetales
- Family: Streptomycetaceae
- Genus: Streptomyces
- Species: S. durbertensis

Binomial name
- Streptomyces durbertensis Yu et al. 2018

Type strain
- NEAU-S1GS20

Species of bacterium

Streptomyces durbertensis is a bacterium species from the genus of Streptomyces which has been isolated from saline-alkali soil from the Heilongjiang Province in China.

== See also ==
- List of Streptomyces species
