= Streptomyces xiangtanensis =

Scientific classification
- Domain: Bacteria
- Kingdom: Bacillati
- Phylum: Actinomycetota
- Class: Actinomycetia
- Order: Streptomycetales
- Family: Streptomycetaceae
- Genus: Streptomyces
- Species: S. xiangtanensis

Binomial name
- Streptomyces xiangtanensis Mo et al. 2021

Type strain
- LUSFXJ

Species of bacterium

Streptomyces xiangtanensis is a bacterium species from the genus Streptomyces which has been isolated from soil near the Xiangtan Manganese Mine.

== See also ==
- List of Streptomyces species
