= Streptomyces paromomycinus =

Scientific classification
- Domain: Bacteria
- Kingdom: Bacillati
- Phylum: Actinomycetota
- Class: Actinomycetia
- Order: Streptomycetales
- Family: Streptomycetaceae
- Genus: Streptomyces
- Species: S. paromomycinus

Binomial name
- Streptomyces paromomycinus (Coffey et al. 1959) Komaki and Tamura 2019

Type strain
- NBRC 15454

Synonyms
- Streptomyces rimosus subsp. paromomycinus

Species of bacterium

Streptomyces paromomycinus is a bacterium species from the genus Streptomyces.
