= Streptomyces malaysiensis =

Scientific classification
- Domain: Bacteria
- Kingdom: Bacillati
- Phylum: Actinomycetota
- Class: Actinomycetia
- Order: Streptomycetales
- Family: Streptomycetaceae
- Genus: Streptomyces
- Species: S. malaysiensis

Binomial name
- Streptomyces malaysiensis Al-Tai et al. 1999

Species of bacterium

Streptomyces malaysiensis is a streptomycete bacterium species. At maturity, the aerial hyphae of this species differentiates into tight, spiral chains of rugose, cylindrical spores. Its type strain is ATB-11^{T}.
