= Streptomyces specialis =

Scientific classification
- Domain: Bacteria
- Kingdom: Bacillati
- Phylum: Actinomycetota
- Class: Actinomycetes
- Order: Streptomycetales
- Family: Streptomycetaceae
- Genus: Streptomyces
- Species: S. specialis

Binomial name
- Streptomyces specialis Kämpfer et al. 2008

Type strain
- CCM 7499, DSM 41924, GW41-1564, JCM 16611

Species of bacterium

Streptomyces specialis is a bacterium species from the genus of Streptomyces which has been isolated from soil in Germany.

== See also ==
- List of Streptomyces species
