= Streptomyces cadmiisoli =

Scientific classification
- Domain: Bacteria
- Kingdom: Bacillati
- Phylum: Actinomycetota
- Class: Actinomycetia
- Order: Streptomycetales
- Family: Streptomycetaceae
- Genus: Streptomyces
- Species: S. cadmiisoli

Binomial name
- Streptomyces cadmiisoli Li et al. 2019

Type strain
- ZFG47

Species of bacterium

Streptomyces cadmiisoli is a bacterium species from the genus of Streptomyces which has been isolated from soil which was contaminated with cadmium.

== See also ==
- List of Streptomyces species
