= Streptomyces deserti =

Scientific classification
- Domain: Bacteria
- Kingdom: Bacillati
- Phylum: Actinomycetota
- Class: Actinomycetia
- Order: Streptomycetales
- Family: Streptomycetaceae
- Genus: Streptomyces
- Species: S. deserti

Binomial name
- Streptomyces deserti Santhanam et al. 2013

Type strain
- CGMCC 4.6997, KACC 15425, C63

Species of bacterium

Streptomyces deserti is a bacterium species from the genus of Streptomyces which has been isolated from hyper-arid desert soil.

== See also ==
- List of Streptomyces species
