= Streptomyces albiflaviniger =

Scientific classification
- Domain: Bacteria
- Kingdom: Bacillati
- Phylum: Actinomycetota
- Class: Actinomycetia
- Order: Streptomycetales
- Family: Streptomycetaceae
- Genus: Streptomyces
- Species: S. albiflaviniger

Binomial name
- Streptomyces albiflaviniger Goodfellow et al. 2008

Type strain
- DSM 41598, NRRL B-1356

Species of Actinobacteria

Streptomyces albiflaviniger is a bacterium species from the genus Streptomyces.

== See also ==
- List of Streptomyces species
