= Streptomyces lichenis =

Scientific classification
- Domain: Bacteria
- Kingdom: Bacillati
- Phylum: Actinomycetota
- Class: Actinomycetia
- Order: Streptomycetales
- Family: Streptomycetaceae
- Genus: Streptomyces
- Species: S. lichenis

Binomial name
- Streptomyces lichenis Saeng-in et al. 2018

Type strain
- LCR6-01

Species of bacterium

Streptomyces lichenis is a bacterium species in the genus Streptomyces, isolated from lichen in the Chiang Rai Province of Thailand.

== See also ==
- List of Streptomyces species
