= Streptomyces sediminis =

Scientific classification
- Domain: Bacteria
- Kingdom: Bacillati
- Phylum: Actinomycetota
- Class: Actinomycetia
- Order: Streptomycetales
- Family: Streptomycetaceae
- Genus: Streptomyces
- Species: S. sediminis

Binomial name
- Streptomyces sediminis Ay et al. 2018

Type strain
- MKSP12

Species of bacterium

Streptomyces sediminis is a bacterium species from the genus of Streptomyces which has been isolated from sediments of a crater lake from Anatolia in Turkey.

== See also ==
- List of Streptomyces species
