= Streptomyces tailanensis =

Scientific classification
- Domain: Bacteria
- Kingdom: Bacillati
- Phylum: Actinomycetota
- Class: Actinomycetia
- Order: Streptomycetales
- Family: Streptomycetaceae
- Genus: Streptomyces
- Species: S. tailanensis

Binomial name
- Streptomyces tailanensis Sun et al. 2020

Type strain
- TRM68348

Species of bacterium

Streptomyces tailanensis is a bacterium species from the genus of Streptomyces which has been isolated from silt from the Tailan River in China.

== See also ==
- List of Streptomyces species
