= Streptomyces graminifolii =

Scientific classification
- Domain: Bacteria
- Kingdom: Bacillati
- Phylum: Actinomycetota
- Class: Actinomycetia
- Order: Streptomycetales
- Family: Streptomycetaceae
- Genus: Streptomyces
- Species: S. graminifolii

Binomial name
- Streptomyces graminifolii Lee and Whang 2014

Type strain
- JL-22

Species of bacterium

Streptomyces graminifolii is a bacterium species from the genus of Streptomyces which has been isolated from the plant Sasa borealis.

== See also ==
- List of Streptomyces species
