= Streptomyces monashensis =

Scientific classification
- Domain: Bacteria
- Kingdom: Bacillati
- Phylum: Actinomycetota
- Class: Actinomycetia
- Order: Streptomycetales
- Family: Streptomycetaceae
- Genus: Streptomyces
- Species: S. monashensis

Binomial name
- Streptomyces monashensis Law et al. 2019

Type strain
- MUSC 1J

Species of bacterium

Streptomyces monashensis is a bacterium species from the genus of Streptomyces which has been isolated from mangrove soil from Sarawak.

== See also ==
- List of Streptomyces species
