= Streptomyces paludis =

Scientific classification
- Domain: Bacteria
- Kingdom: Bacillati
- Phylum: Actinomycetota
- Class: Actinomycetia
- Order: Streptomycetales
- Family: Streptomycetaceae
- Genus: Streptomyces
- Species: S. paludis

Binomial name
- Streptomyces paludis Zhao et al. 2020

Type strain
- GSSD-12

Species of bacterium

Streptomyces paludis is a Gram-positive bacterium species from the genus of Streptomyces which has been isolated from alpine wetland soil.

== See also ==
- List of Streptomyces species
