= Streptomyces olivomycini =

Scientific classification
- Domain: Bacteria
- Kingdom: Bacillati
- Phylum: Actinomycetota
- Class: Actinomycetes
- Order: Streptomycetales
- Family: Streptomycetaceae
- Genus: Streptomyces
- Species: S. olivomycini

Binomial name
- Streptomyces olivomycini Witt and Stackebrandt 1991

Synonyms
- Streptoverticillium olivomycini

Species of bacterium

Streptomyces olivomycini is a bacterium species from the genus of Streptomyces.

== See also ==
- List of Streptomyces species
