= Streptomyces alkaliterrae =

Scientific classification
- Domain: Bacteria
- Kingdom: Bacillati
- Phylum: Actinomycetota
- Class: Actinomycetes
- Order: Streptomycetales
- Family: Streptomycetaceae
- Genus: Streptomyces
- Species: S. alkaliterrae

Binomial name
- Streptomyces alkaliterrae Swiecimska et al. 2020

Species of bacterium

Streptomyces alkaliterrae is a bacterium species from the genus Streptomyces which has been isolated from alkaline soil.

== See also ==
- List of Streptomyces species
