= Streptomyces canalis =

Scientific classification
- Domain: Bacteria
- Kingdom: Bacillati
- Phylum: Actinomycetota
- Class: Actinomycetia
- Order: Streptomycetales
- Family: Streptomycetaceae
- Genus: Streptomyces
- Species: S. canalis

Binomial name
- Streptomyces canalis Xie et al. 2016

Species of bacterium

Streptomyces canalis is a bacterium species from the genus of Streptomyces which has been isolated from an alkali-removing canal in Xinjiang in China.

== See also ==
- List of Streptomyces species
