= Streptomyces thermocarboxydus =

Scientific classification
- Domain: Bacteria
- Kingdom: Bacillati
- Phylum: Actinomycetota
- Class: Actinomycetes
- Order: Streptomycetales
- Family: Streptomycetaceae
- Genus: Streptomyces
- Species: S. thermocarboxydus

Binomial name
- Streptomyces thermocarboxydus Kim et al. 1998

Species of bacterium

Streptomyces thermocarboxydus is a streptomycete bacterium species. It is moderately thermophilic and carboxydotrophic, with type strain AT37.
