= Streptomyces phaeolivaceus =

Scientific classification
- Domain: Bacteria
- Kingdom: Bacillati
- Phylum: Actinomycetota
- Class: Actinomycetia
- Order: Streptomycetales
- Family: Streptomycetaceae
- Genus: Streptomyces
- Species: S. phaeolivaceus

Binomial name
- Streptomyces phaeolivaceus Mo et al. 2020

Species of bacterium

Streptomyces phaeolivaceus is a bacterium species from the genus of Streptomyces.

== See also ==
- List of Streptomyces species
