= Streptomyces cavernae =

Scientific classification
- Domain: Bacteria
- Kingdom: Bacillati
- Phylum: Actinomycetota
- Class: Actinomycetia
- Order: Streptomycetales
- Family: Streptomycetaceae
- Genus: Streptomyces
- Species: S. cavernae

Binomial name
- Streptomyces cavernae Fang et al. 2020

Type strain
- SYSU K10008

Species of bacterium

Streptomyces cavernae is a bacterium species from the genus of Streptomyces.

== See also ==
- List of Streptomyces species
