= Streptomyces speleomycini =

Scientific classification
- Domain: Bacteria
- Kingdom: Bacillati
- Phylum: Actinomycetota
- Class: Actinomycetes
- Order: Streptomycetales
- Family: Streptomycetaceae
- Genus: Streptomyces
- Species: S. speleomycini

Binomial name
- Streptomyces speleomycini Preobrazhenskaya and Szabó 1986

Species of bacterium

Streptomyces speleomycini is a bacterium species from the genus of Streptomyces.

== See also ==
- List of Streptomyces species
