= Streptomyces roseifaciens =

Scientific classification
- Domain: Bacteria
- Kingdom: Bacillati
- Phylum: Actinomycetota
- Class: Actinomycetia
- Order: Streptomycetales
- Family: Streptomycetaceae
- Genus: Streptomyces
- Species: S. roseifaciens

Binomial name
- Streptomyces roseifaciens van der Aart et al. 2019

Synonyms
- Streptomyces roseofaciens

Species of bacterium

Streptomyces roseifaciens is a bacterium species from the genus Streptomyces.
