= Streptomyces lohii =

Scientific classification
- Domain: Bacteria
- Kingdom: Bacillati
- Phylum: Actinomycetota
- Class: Actinomycetia
- Order: Streptomycetales
- Family: Streptomycetaceae
- Genus: Streptomyces
- Species: S. lohii

Binomial name
- Streptomyces lohii None 2015

Species of bacterium

Streptomyces lohii is a bacterium species from the genus of Streptomyces.

== See also ==
- List of Streptomyces species
