= List of potato diseases =

Listicle of diseases and disorders in potatoes

This is a list of diseases and disorders found in potatoes.

== Bacterial diseases ==
Bacterial Diseases
Bacterial wilt = brown rot	Ralstonia solanacearum = Pseudomonas solanacearum
Blackleg and bacterial soft rot	Pectobacterium carotovorum subsp. atrosepticum = Erwinia carotovora subsp. atroseptica P. c. subsp. carotovorum = E. c. subsp. carotovora P. chrysanthemi = E. chrysanthemi Dickeya solani
Pink eye	Pseudomonas fluorescens
Ring rot	Clavibacter michiganensis subsp. sepedonicus = Corynebacterium sepedonicum
Common scab	Streptomyces scabiei = S. scabies S. acidiscabies S. turgidiscabies
Zebra chip = Psyllid yellows?	Candidatus Liberibacter solanacearum

== Fungal diseases ==
Fungal diseases
Black dot	Colletotrichum coccodes = Colletotrichum atramentarium
Brown spot and Black pit	Alternaria alternata = Alternaria tenuis
Cercospora leaf blotch	Mycovellosiella concors = Cercospora concors C. solani C. solani-tuberosi
Charcoal rot	Macrophomina phaseolina = Sclerotium bataticola]
Choanephora blight	Choanephora cucurbitarum
Common rust	Puccinia pittieriana
Deforming rust	Aecidium cantensis
Early blight	Alternaria solani
Fusarium dry rot	Fusarium spp. Gibberella pulicaris = F. solani Other spp. include: F. avenaceum F. oxysporum F. culmorum Less common spp. include: F. acuminatum F. equiseti F. crookwellense
Fusarium wilt	Fusarium spp. F. avenaceum F. oxysporum F. solani f. sp. eumartii
Gangrene	Phoma solanicola f. foveata Ph. foveata = Ph. exigua var. foveata = Ph. e. f. sp. foveata Ph. e. var. exigua
Gray mold	Botrytis cinerea Botryotinia fuckeliana [teleomorph]
Phoma leaf spot	Ph. andigena var. andina
Powdery mildew	Erysiphe cichoracearum
Rhizoctonia canker and black scurf	Rhizoctonia solani
Rosellinia black rot	Rosellinia sp. Dematophora sp. [anamorph]
Septoria leaf spot	S. lycopersici var. malagutii
Silver scurf	Helminthosporium solani
Skin spot	Polyscytalum pustulans
Stem rot (southern blight)	Athelia rolfsii
Thecaphora smut	Angiosorus solani = Thecaphora solani
Ulocladium blight	Ulocladium atrum
Verticillium wilt	Verticillium albo-atrum V. dahliae
Wart	Synchytrium endobioticum
White mold (=	Sclerotinia sclerotiorum

== Protistan diseases ==
Protistan diseases
Late blight (oomycete)	Phytophthora infestans
Leak (oomycete)	Pythium spp. Pythium ultimum var. ultimum = Pythium debaryanum Pythium aphanidermatum Pythium deliense
Pink rot (oomycete)	Phytophthora spp. Phytophthora cryptogea Phytophthora drechsleri Phytophthora erythroseptica Phytophthora megasperma Phytophthora nicotianae var. parasitica
Powdery scab (Rhizaria)	Spongospora subterranea f.sp. subterranea

== Viral and viroid diseases ==
Viral and viroid diseases
Alfalfa mosaic virus	genus Alfamovirus, Alfalfa mosaic virus (AMV)
Andean potato latent virus	genus Tymovirus, Andean potato latent virus (APLV)
Andean potato mottle virus	genus Comovirus, Andean potato mottle virus (APMV)
Arracacha virus B - Oca strain	genus Nepovirus, Arracacha virus B Oca strain (AVB-O)
Beet curly top virus	genus Curtovirus, Beet curly top virus (BCTV)
Cucumber mosaic virus	genus Cucumovirus, Cucumber mosaic virus (CMV)
Eggplant mottle dwarf virus	genus Rhabdovirus, Eggplant mottle dwarf virus (EMDV)
Potato aucuba mosaic virus	genus Potexvirus, Potato aucuba mosaic virus (PAMV)
Potato black ringspot virus	genus Nepovirus, Potato black ringspot virus (PBRSV)
Potato deforming mosaic virus	genus Geminiviridae Potato deforming mosaic virus subgroup III, (PDMV)
Potato latent virus	genus Carlavirus, Potato latent virus (PLV)
Potato leafroll virus	genus Luteovirus, Potato leafroll virus (PLRV)
Potato mop-top virus (spraing of tubers)	genus Furovirus, Potato mop-top virus (PMTV)
Potato rugose mosaic	genus Potyvirus, Potato virus Y (PVY, strains O, N and C)
Potato stem mottle (spraing of tubers)	genus Tobravirus, Tobacco rattle virus (TRV)
Potato spindle tuber	Potato spindle tuber viroid (PSTVd)
Potato yellow dwarf virus	genus Nucleorhabdovirus, Potato yellow dwarf virus (PYDV)
Potato yellow mosaic virus	genus Geminiviridae, Potato yellow mosaic virus (PYMV); subgroup III
Potato yellow vein virus	Potato yellow vein virus (PYVV)
Potato yellowing virus	genus Alfamovirus, Potato yellowing virus (PYV)
Potato virus A	genus Potyvirus, Potato virus A (PVA)
Potato virus M	genus Carlavirus, Potato virus M (PVM)
Potato virus S	genus Carlavirus, Potato virus S (PVS)
Potato virus H	genus Carlavirus, Potato virus H (PVH)
Potato virus T	genus Trichovirus, Potato virus T
Potato virus U	genus Nepovirus, Potato virus U (PVU)
Potato virus V	genus Potyvirus, Potato virus V (PVV)
Potato virus X	genus Potexvirus, Potato virus X (PVX)
Potato virus Y	genus Potyvirus, Potato virus Y (PVY)
Solanum apical leaf curling virus	Geminiviridae, Solanum apical leaf curling virus (SALCV) subgroup III
Sowbane mosaic virus	genus Sobemovirus, Sowbane mosaic virus (SoMV)
Tobacco mosaic virus	genus Tobamovirus, Tobacco mosaic virus (TMV)
Tobacco necrosis virus	genus Necrovirus, Tobacco necrosis virus (TNV)
Tobacco rattle virus	genus Tobravirus, Tobacco rattle virus (TRV)
Tobacco streak virus	genus Ilarvirus, Tobacco streak virus (TSV)
Tomato black ring virus	genus Nepovirus, Tomato black ring virus (ToBRV)
Tomato mosaic virus	genus Tobamovirus, Tomato mosaic virus (ToMV)
Tomato spotted wilt virus	genus Tospovirus, Tomato spotted wilt virus (TSWV)
Tomato yellow mosaic virus	genus Geminiviridae, Tomato yellow mosaic virus (ToYMV) subgroup III
Wild potato mosaic virus	genus Potyvirus, Wild potato mosaic virus (WPMV)

== Nematode parasitic ==
Nematode parasitic
Potato cyst nematode	Globodera rostochiensis Globodera pallida
Lesion nematode	Pratylenchus spp. Pratylenchus brachyurus Pratylenchus penetrans Other species include: Pratylenchus scribneri Pratylenchus neglectus Pratylenchus thornei Pratylenchus crenatus Pratylenchus andinus Pratylenchus vulnus Pratylenchus coffeae
Potato rot nematode	Ditylenchus destructor
Root knot nematode	Meloidogyne spp. Meloidogyne hapla Meloidogyne incognita Meloidogyne javanica Meloidogyne chitwoodi
Sting nematode	Belonolaimus longicaudatus
Stubby-root nematode	Paratrichodorus spp. Trichodorus spp.

== Phytoplasmal diseases ==
Phytoplasmal diseases
Aster yellows	Aster yellows group of phytoplasmas
Witches'-broom	Witches’ broom phytoplasma
BLTVA	The beet leafhopper-transmitted virescence agent

== Miscellaneous diseases and disorders ==
Miscellaneous diseases and disorders
Aerial tubers	Phytoplasma infection or anything that constricts the stem, including but not limited to Rhizoctonia canker, heat necrosis, chemical injury, mechanical injury, wind injury
Air pollution injury	Photochemical oxidants (primarily ozone), sulfur oxides
Black heart	Oxygen deficiency of internal tuber tissue
Blackspot bruise	Bruising, pressure contact
Elephant hide	Roughening of tuber skin due to physiological or environmental causes
Hollow heart	Excessively rapid tuber enlargement
Internal brown spot = heat necrosis	Oxygen deficiency of tuber accompanying high soil temperature
Jelly end rot	Carbohydrate translocation due to second growth
Physiological leaf roll	Response to adverse environment
Psyllid yellows	Toxic saliva of the potato (tomato) psyllid, Paratrioza cockerelli
Shatter bruise	Mechanical damage to tuber
Skinning	Mechanical damage to tuber
Stem-end browning	Exact cause(s) unknown, chemical injury, viruses or other pathogens.
