= Potato production in Algeria =

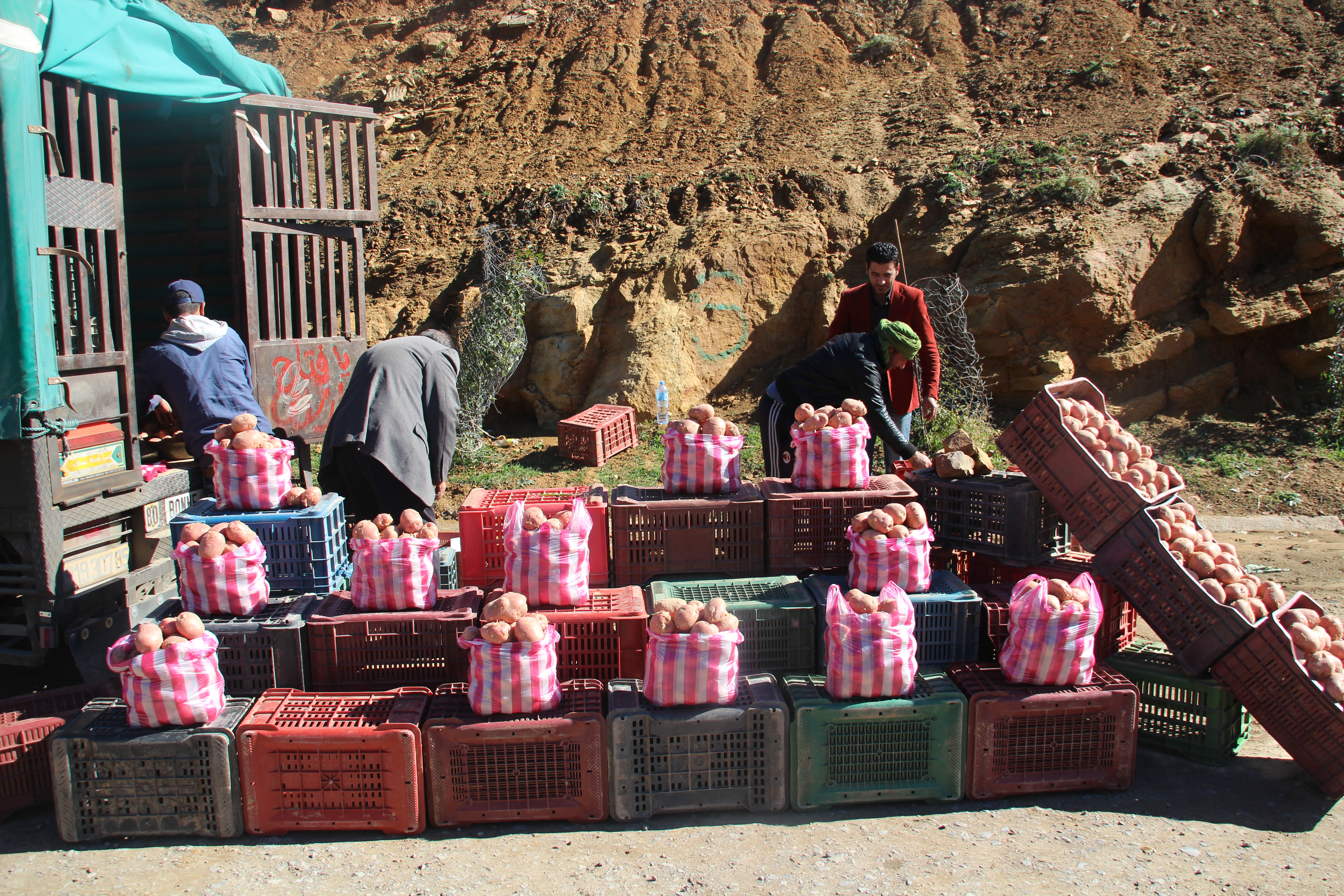
A potato seller in Batna, Algeria

The cultivation of potatoes is a major part of the agricultural industry of Algeria. The country was the 17th-largest producer of potatoes in the world in 2018. Production is centred on two regions: the Mediterranean coast and the desert around El Oued. Growing conditions in the coast are broadly conventional in earth furrows while at El Oued centre pivot irrigation predominates, with the potatoes grown in sand. Only an insignificant minority of the crop is factory-processed.

== History ==
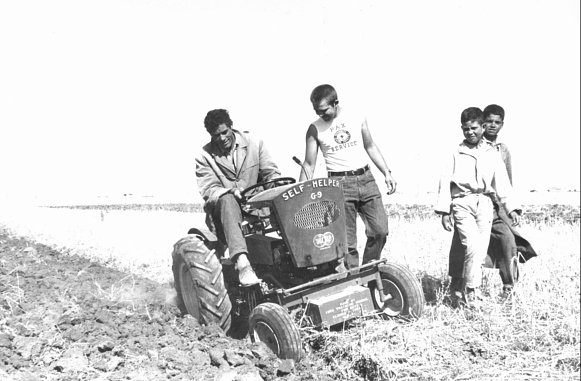
Ploughing a field in Algeria, 1965

Potatoes have been grown in Algeria (then a French colony) since at least the late 19th century, when problems with the crop being affected by the potato tuber moth, Phthorimaea operculella, were reported. Potatoes had become a major crop by 1951 and they were exported to France. In July 1951 growers in Algeria blamed high taxes and railway freight charges for making the crop uneconomic to grow and held a three-day stoppage to attempt to pressure the French government into taking action. Exports elsewhere, such as to the United Kingdom, were hampered by a lack of harbour facilities. By the 1970s, following Algerian independence, potatoes were grown on large scale on government farms in the Mascara Province. In the 1990s the government farms were broken up among private companies and individuals, resulting in an expansion in production.

== Production ==
Algeria is a significant producer of potatoes which are the second most popular staple food in the country, after bread. In 2018 Algeria produced 4,653,322 tonnes (4,579,830 long tons) of potatoes making it the 17th greatest producer in the world and the 2nd largest in Africa (after Egypt). Production is concentrated in two regions: the coastal region around Mostaganem, Aïn Defla, Boumerdes and Bouira and the desert region centred on El Oued Province.

The warm climate means that potatoes can be grown for 9 months of the year, allowing for three seasons of production. The Premiere (first) season starts January–March and harvests in May–August; the Arrière (last) season starts in August–September and harvests in December while the Primeur (early crop) is little used and only accounts for 5% of production. In general production on the coast is focused on the Premiere season while the desert region concentrates on the Arrière season. There is a gap in potato supply to market from September to December due to the gap between harvesting seasons.

Seed potatoes can only be imported in January so the Arrière season relies on locally grown seed potatoes or those that have been stored. Seed potato imports are mainly from the Netherlands and largely from two companies: Agrico and ZPC. The Algerian government has attempted to support the production of local seed potatoes to reduce reliance on foreign imports and has taken measures to regulate the growing conditions of seed stock to ensure quality.

Potato is the main crop requiring irrigation in Algeria and large volumes of water are used for this: agricultural irrigation accounts for 70-80% of all water use in Algeria. Much of the water used for agriculture is obtained by abstraction from wells as a charge is made for water taken from government reservoirs. Abstraction has led to a noticeable drop in ground water levels. Fertilisers are commonly used but purchases are restricted by the government as it can be made into explosives. There is a low level of mechanisation in the potato-growing sector and much harvesting is done by hand. This is a low status occupation and as a result there are often shortages of labour. Potato farmers are often members of the two main agricultural cooperatives: the Coopérative Agricole de Services des Approvisionnements (CASAB) and the Cooperative d’Agricole de Guemar.

=== Coastal region ===
Potatoes in the coastal region are typically grown in fields of 3–40 hectares (7.4–98.8 acres) in size. The crop can grown in rotation with cereals or water melon but for most farmers that grow potato it forms the main crop. The main variety grown in the region is Spunta (accounting for 40% of all production) but Condor, Désirée, Fabula and Ultra are also grown.

The soil of the region is heavy and preparation of the ground by tractor ploughing is required before sowing; small farms typically sow by hand but on large farms it is done mechanically. Coastal farmers also report that the heavy soil makes mechanical harvesting impossible and most harvesting is done by hand. Because labour is so cheap most irrigation is also done manually, by moving hose fed sprinklers around the fields. The soil of the region is short of organic material and, because organic fertiliser is in short supply there is a heavy reliance on chemical fertilisers. Fertiliser is typically applied two times each season.

=== El Oued region ===
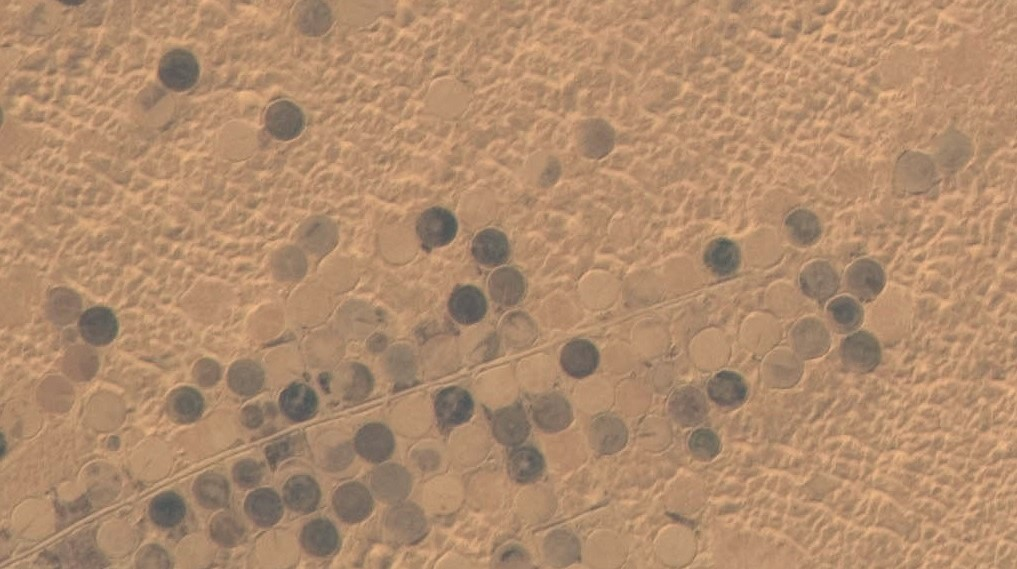
El Oued crop pivots photographed from space

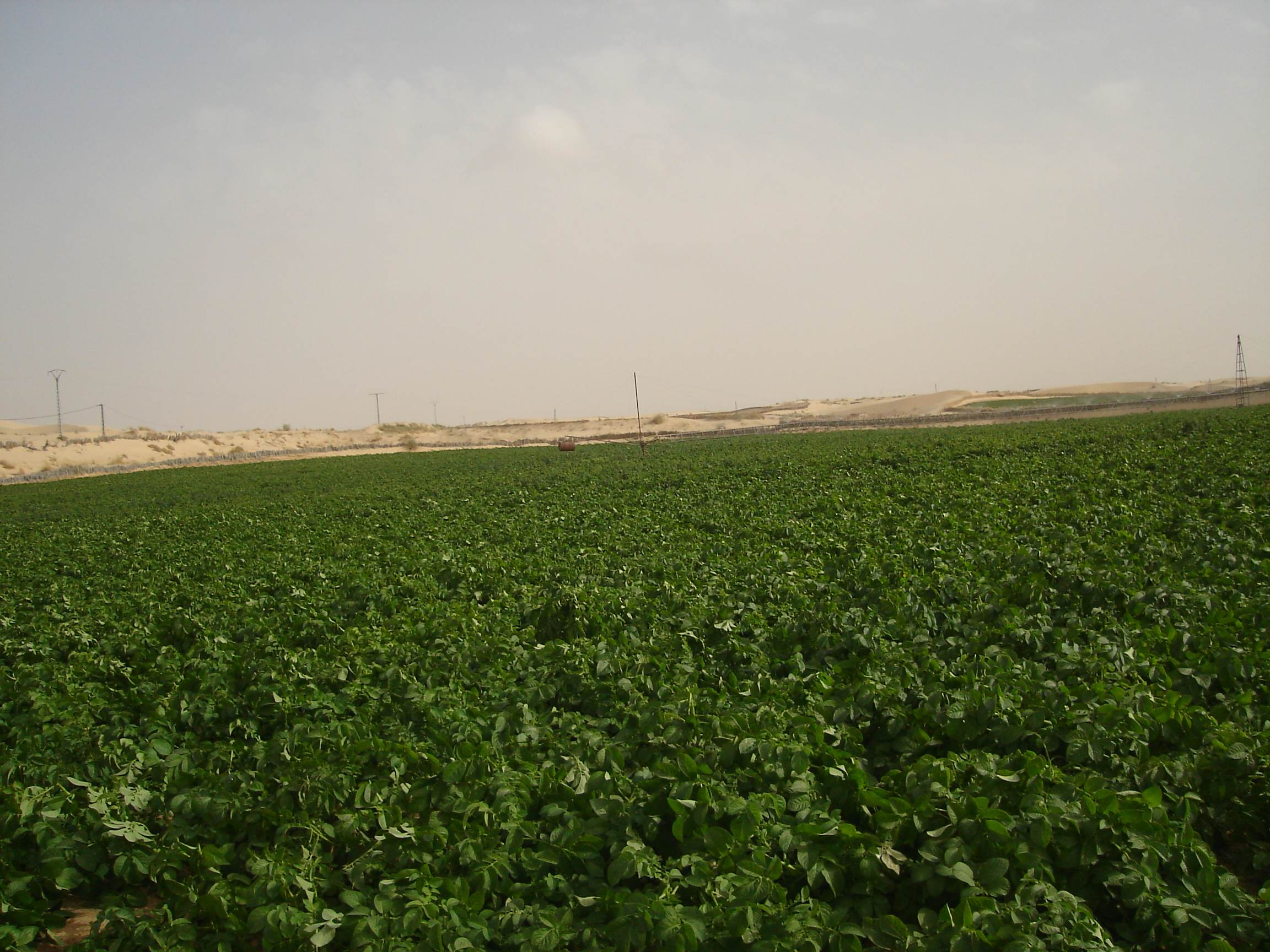
A centre pivot irrigation potato field at El Oued

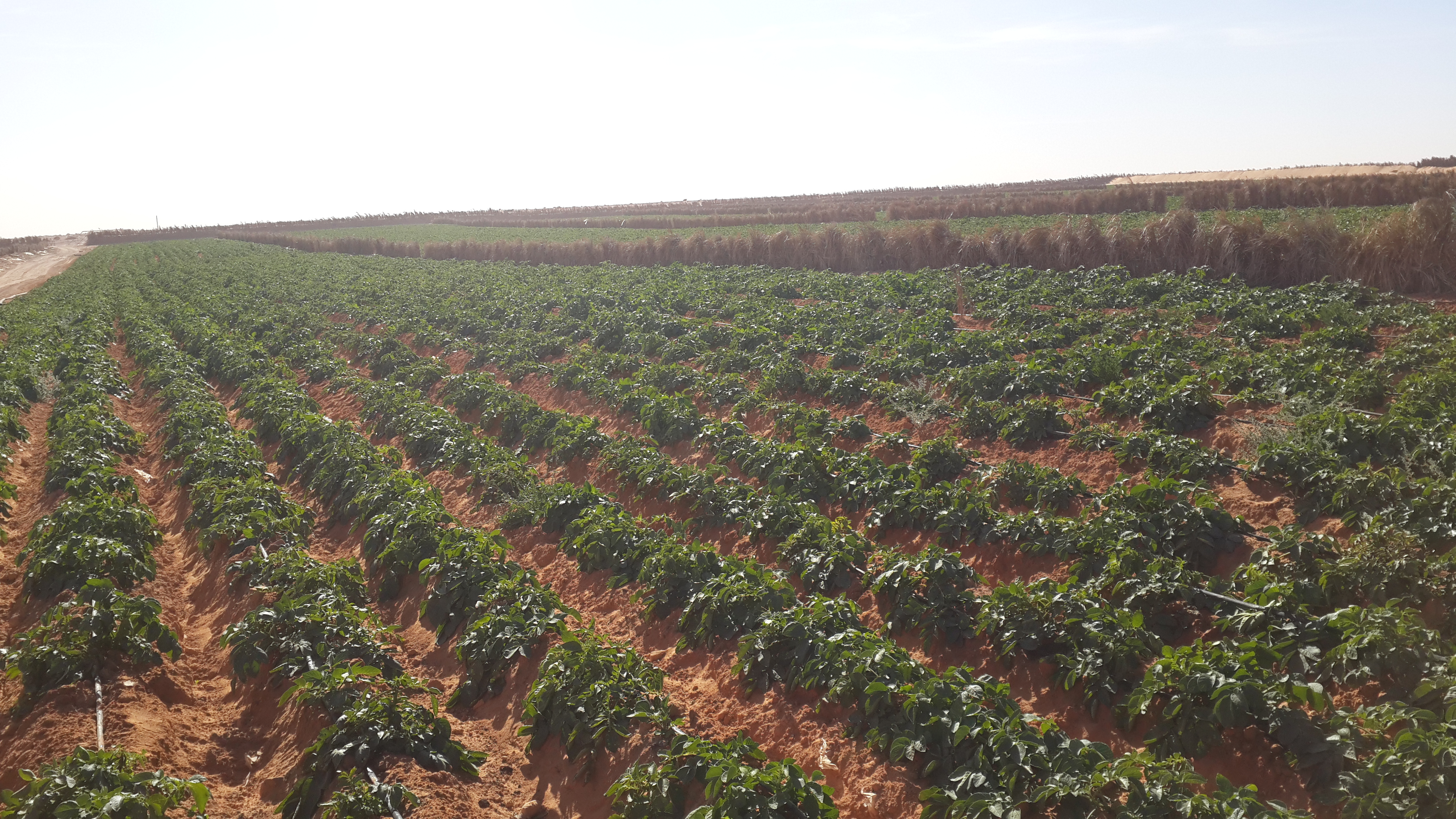
A rectangular, drip-irrigated potato field at El Oued

El Oued is an oasis town in the Sahara desert, close to the Tunisian border. The Algerian government provides desert land here free of charge to those that can afford to level the sand dunes and turn the land to agriculture. Because of the desert conditions artificial irrigation is essential and a wind break must be constructed to protect the crops from being buried by blown sand. The wind breaks are typically 2 metres (6.6 ft) high sand dunes reinforced with a fence of braided palm leaves on top.

The area was traditionally used for growing date palm but potato production began in 1986 and by 2017 more than 30,000 hectares (74,000 acres) were under cultivation by 47,000 farmers. The region now accounts for 40% of all potatoes grown in Algeria, though tomato, melon, tobacco and grain are also grown at El Oued. The main variety grown is Spunta and most farmers plant to the Arrière season, though in recent years some have switched to the Premiere season.

The farms are typically set up as centre pivot irrigation fields of around 0.9 hectares (2.2 acres) in size. Farms have up to 70 pivots but the majority of farmers maintain 5-10. The pivot irrigation systems are locally made from aluminium and iron. They complete a full rotation in around 2.5–3 hours and supply water to the crops as a high pressure mist. A single well can supply 2-3 pivots and irrigation is applied for 6–8 hours a day for Premiere season crops and 18 hours a day for Arrière season potatoes. Most irrigation is carried out during the night; some farmers irrigate for 24 hours a day but this is rare due to the higher cost of electricity in the day. The abstraction of water is gradually depleting the aquifers at El Oued.

Most agricultural work in El Oued is carried out by hand as the ground is loose sand and labour (almost entirely male) is cheap. Before planting manure is typically spread on the pivot and throughout the season NPK fertilizer is usually applied three times. The potatoes are planted in furrows by hand with 15-20 men taking around 4 hours to plant each pivot. Harvesting is also done by hand as no machine on the market is capable of harvesting from sand, potatoes usually being grown in earth. Sometimes the potatoes are left in the sand for 1–3 months due to a lack of storage facilities.

Around 80% of farmers leave the pivot bare for the following season instead of applying crop rotation, but where rotation is practised garlic or onion is typically grown. Every 2–3 years the sand in the pivot is dug out and replaced to remove diseases and pests (such as nematodes). Yields achieved at El Oued are typically 40 tonnes (39 long tons) per pivot in the Premiere season and 30 tonnes (30 long tons) in the Arrière season, though the price is higher.

== Pests and diseases ==
A number of pests and diseases affect potato production in Algeria. The potato cyst nematode is widely distributed in Algeria in a number of different varieties originating from Europe and South America. The potyviruses Potato leafroll virus, Potato virus A, Potato virus S, Potato virus X and Potato virus Y are all present in Algeria though the Y is by far the most common. Weeds can be an issue and herbicides are commonly applied against these, though some have become resistant.

The Phthorimaea operculella (potato tuber moth) and aphids also cause issues. Large potato farms typically apply insecticide 2-3 time per season to protect against these pests, though smaller farms cannot afford to do this. Since the 2010s early blight caused by the fungus Alternaria protenta has been reported, particularly in the north-west of the country where it affected 80% of the 2016 crop. The fungi Phytophthora, Rhizoctonia and, sometimes, Fusarium can also cause issues and in the coastal region crops are usually treated with fungicides every 7–8 days. The bacterium Pectobacterium carotovorum which causes bacterial soft rot is present in Western Algeria and other bacterial diseases known are blackleg and Ralstonia.

== Use ==
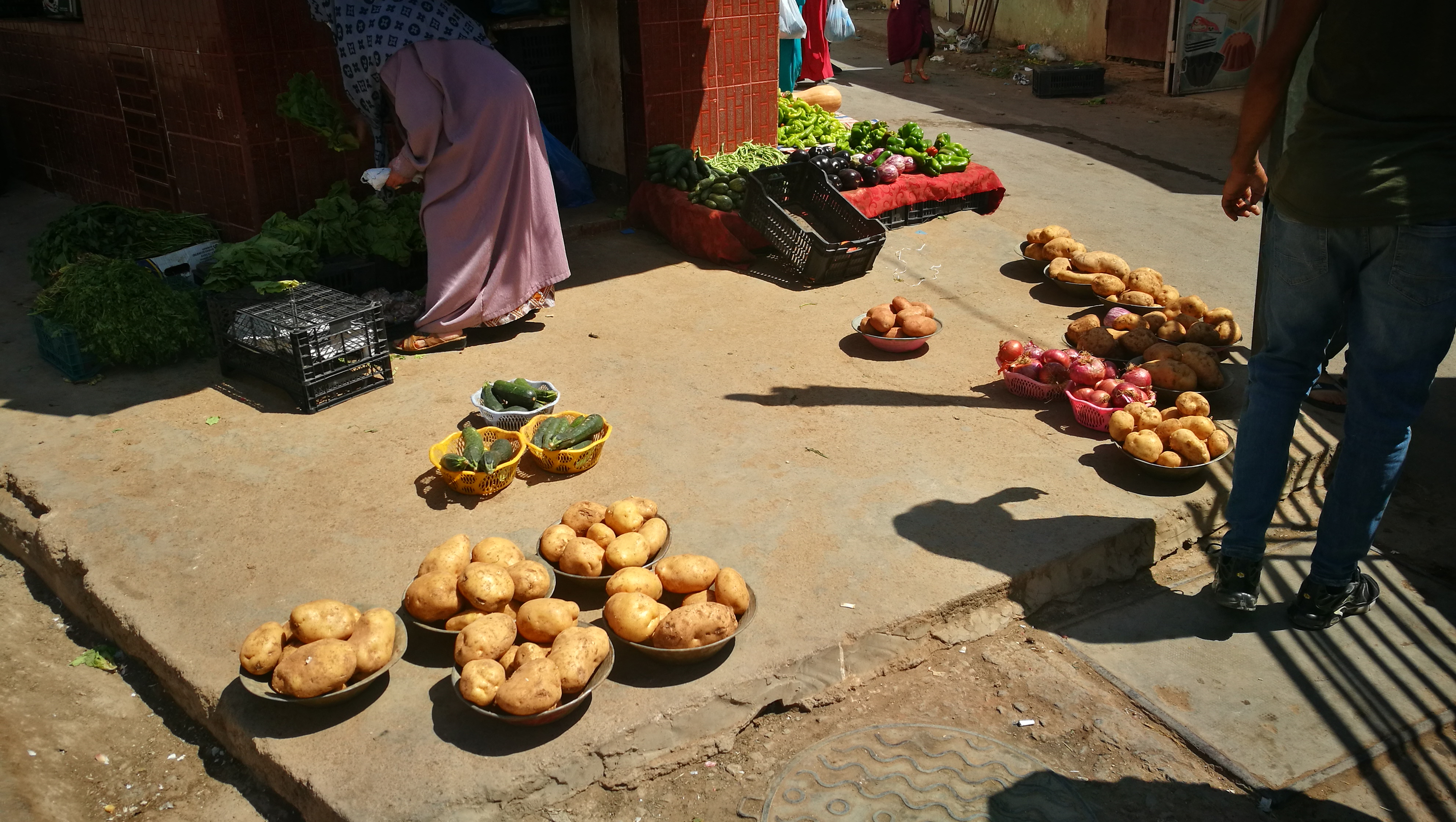
Potatoes for sale in Mascara, Algeria

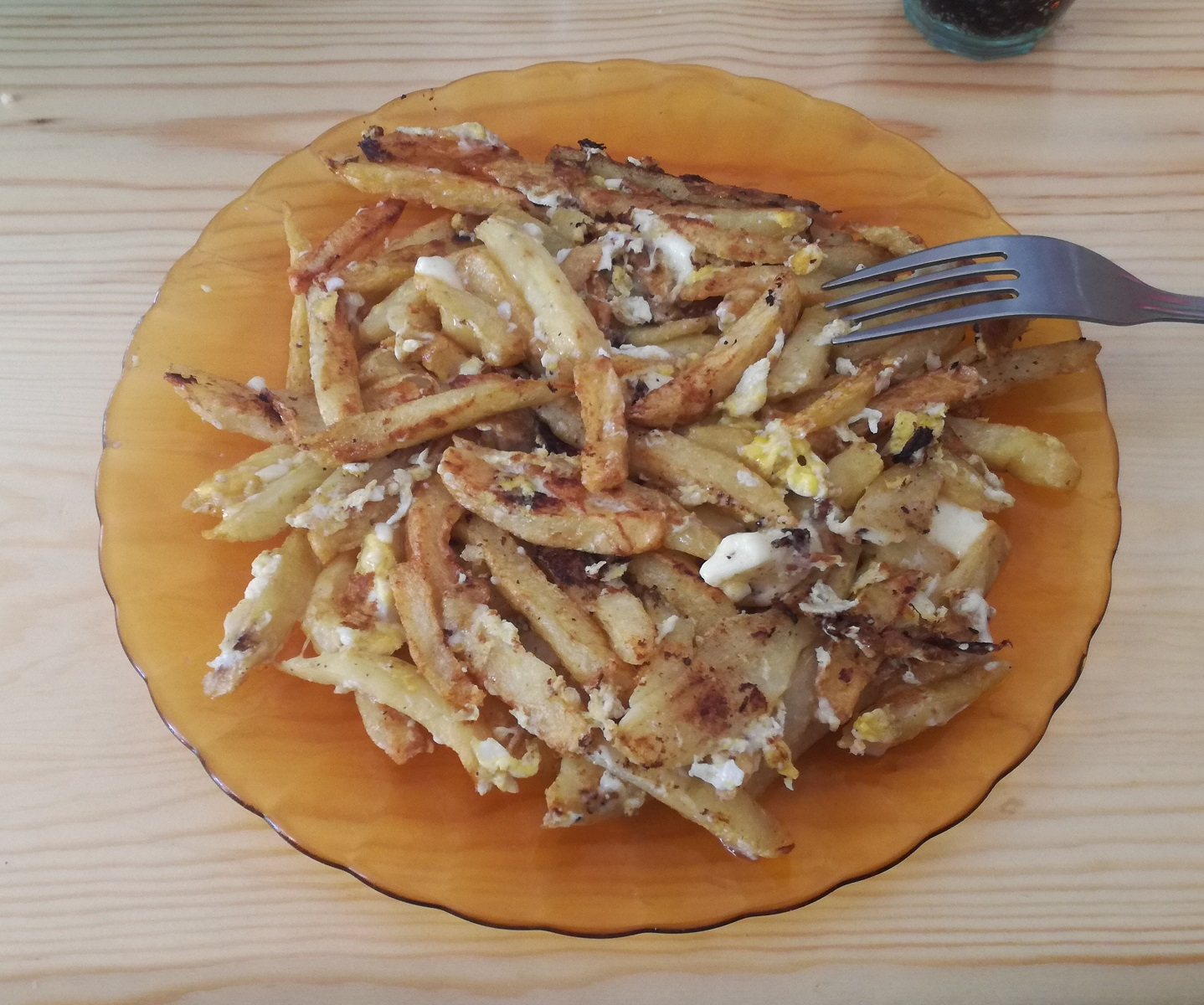
Algerian French fries with egg and cheese

The potatoes are sold directly by the farmers at wholesale markets or else to middlemen who sell them to other markets or to shops. The Algerian Ministry of Agriculture provides a subsidy (Le Système de régulation des produits agricoles de large consommation, SYRPALAC) to growers to store their potatoes, under government control, with the aim of providing a supply in times of shortage. Storage space is currently limited but more facilities are under construction. Potatoes are commonly eaten as chips (French fries) which are widely available as street food. The vast majority of these are cut and prepared by hand as there are no Algerian factories producing chips. Some factories do operate to manufacture crisps (potato chips) but less than 1% of Algerian potato production is processed in a factory.
