= Viral diseases of potato =

Group of diseases affecting potato plants

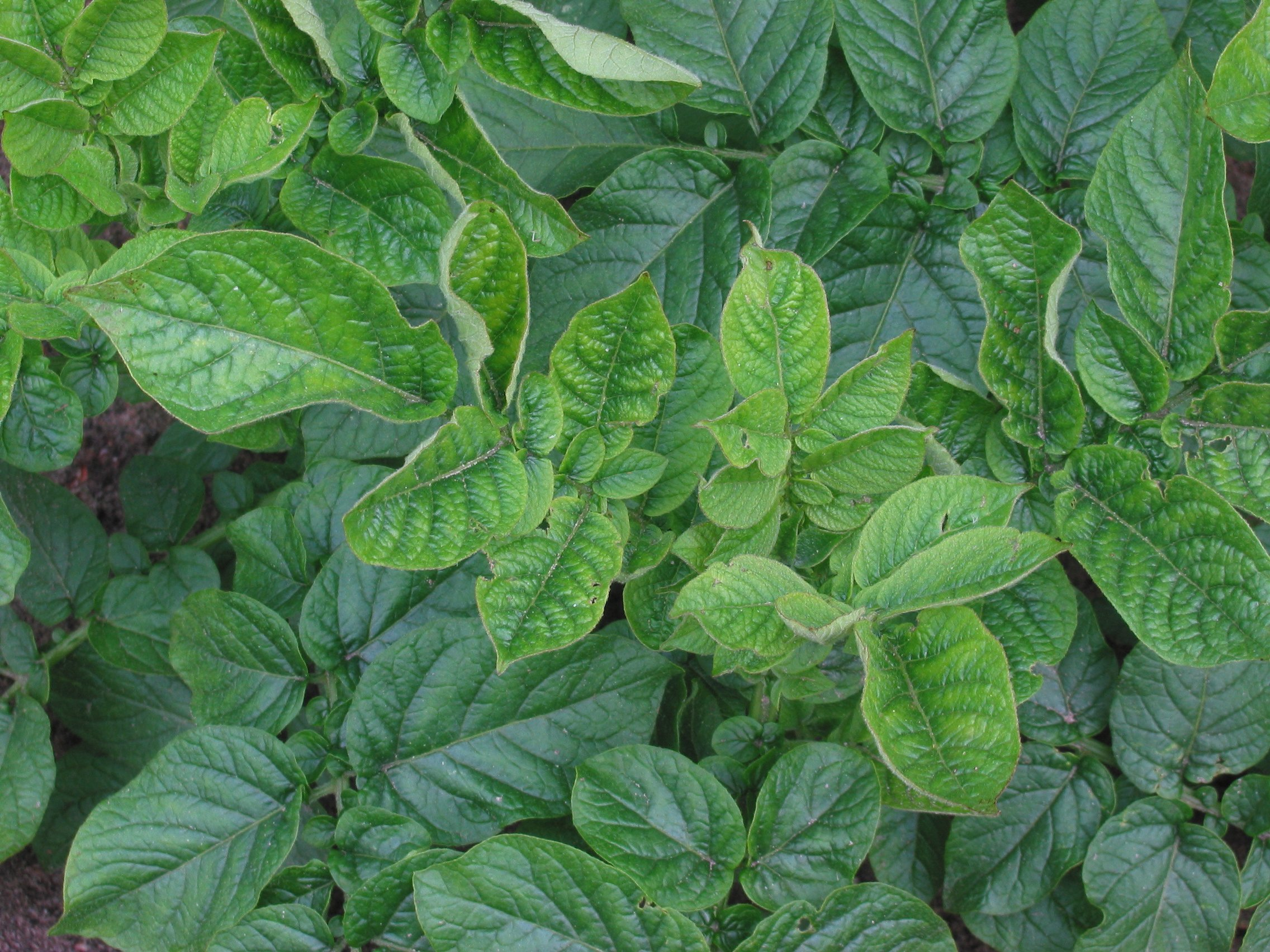
Appearance of a potato plant affected by a virus.

Viral diseases of potato are a group of diseases caused by different types of Viruses that affect potato crops worldwide and, although they do not affect human or animal health since they are viruses that only infect vegetables, they are a source of great economic losses annually. About 28 viruses have been reported infecting potato crops. However, potato virus X (PVX), potato virus Y (PVY), and potato leafroll virus (PLRV) are the most important viruses worldwide. Some others are of economic importance only in some regions. Such is the case of potato virus M (PVM) in some Asian and European countries.

An additional problem is the co-infection of two or more viruses on the same plants. In fact, the joint occurrence of PVX and PVY, or either or both of them with PLRV or Potato virus A (PVA), produces much more severe symptoms than separate infection of each. The magnitude of economic losses associated with this synergistic effect depends on the types of viruses that are interacting, their respective races, their interaction with the host potato cultivar, the viral vectors involved, and the environment.

Diseases caused by viruses are one of the main limiting factors of potato cultivation worldwide, not only because of the immediate damage they can cause, but also because their effect is cumulative over time. Since potato is an asexually propagated species, the viruses present in a given plant are passed on to the next clonal generation through the tuber pieces used for multiplication. In the new generation, new viruses of the same or other species may be added to the existing ones, increasing the virus load of these plants. This accumulation of viruses is mainly responsible for the so-called gradual degeneration of potato varieties, the consequences of which are a gradual decrease in the vigor and yield of the crop as well as an increase in quality losses due to a reduction in the possible shelf life of the tubers after harvest.

Most potato viruses can be diagnosed by the presence of characteristic symptoms, such as mosaic patterns on leaves, stunting of plants, and deformations of leaves and tubers. However, these symptoms do not always manifest themselves due to interactions between the virus(es) involved, the potato variety and the environment (soil fertility, climate or the age at which the plant is infected, among many other variables). For this reason, in recent years, serological and molecular detection techniques have been used to diagnose and characterize the viruses affecting the crop to take the most appropriate control measures.

The following is a description of several of the viral diseases of potato crops, their symptoms and management possibilities.

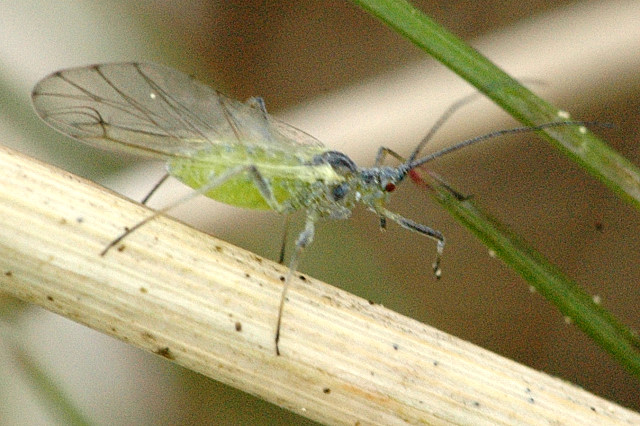
Myzus persicae, an aphid that can transmit viruses in potato crops.

== Main viruses ==
=== Potato leafroll virus (PLRV) ===
Potato leafroll virus (PLRV), also known as "leafroll" or "yellow dwarfism", is a phloem-limited Luteovirus, which is transmitted by aphids, the green peach aphid (Myzus persicae) being one of the most important vectors. This virus needs 20 to 30 minutes to be acquired and 24 to 48 hours to be transmitted by aphids, since it needs to move inside the insect's digestive tract and come out again through the salivary glands. Symptoms of PLRV in potato include a characteristic erect growth habit and the classic "inward" rolling of the leaf blades that gives the virus its name. In addition, chlorosis (i.e., yellowing) or reddening of leaves and necrotic spots along the leaf veins due to phloem cell death may be visualized. The consistency or texture of the leaves also changes, as they become more leathery. Reduced plant height (a symptom called "dwarfism") and net necrosis in tubers complete the repertoire of symptoms shown by potato plants affected by PLRV.

Because the acquisition, transmission and dissemination of PLRV requires a few days, insecticide applications to eliminate insect vectors can be effective as a control measure. The use of virus-free seed tubers is of fundamental importance to achieve healthy crops. During cultivation, removal of plants showing symptoms helps prevent the spread of PLRV. Also, early harvesting of tubers can help prevent infection later in the season. The virus is not spread or transmitted mechanically.

=== Mosaics ===
In plant pathology, "mosaic" is a symptom, characteristic of many viruses, in which diseased leaves show undefined dark green sectors alternating with lighter colored sectors, ranging from light green to yellow. Potato leaf mosaic symptoms can be caused by different viruses individually or in combination. Some of them are potato virus X (PVX), potato virus S (PVS) and potato virus M (PVM), as well as PVY and PVA.

Depending on the virus variant and the potato cultivar considered, PVX can decrease tuber yield by more than 10%, making it one of the most important potato viruses after PLRV. It is transmitted by infected tubers and by contact; it is not transmitted by aphids. The characteristic symptom of PVX is mild leaf mosaic (i.e., leaf coloration variations are not accentuated) and it is often latent (i.e., the plant is infected but does not show symptoms). The more virulent variants of potato virus X|PVX virus can cause more severe symptoms, such as leaf curling and necrosis of certain areas of the leaves, as well as mosaic. On the other hand, some potato cultivars are hypersensitive to certain variants of the virus and react to infection with apical necrosis, i.e. death of the plant apex.

PVS is a fairly widespread virus and generally causes mild symptoms. Plants affected by PVS do not show significant yield reduction. It is transmitted by infected tubers, by contact and, in certain variants, also by aphids. PVS infection is usually latent, although some cultivars show a soft mosaic or fainter color bands on the veins when infected with this virus. Cultivars more susceptible to PVS react with severe browning (leaves become redder in color), chlorotic spots that later become necrotic, and even leaf drop (a symptom called defoliation).

PVM is a less widely distributed virus than those mentioned above and little is known about its effects on yield. It is perpetuated by infected tubers and is transmitted by contact and aphids. The virus remains dormant in some cultivars, but in the most susceptible cultivars it causes mild to severe mosaic and leaf deformations. Under certain environmental conditions, symptoms may be more severe, as plants may develop necrosis on petioles and leaf veins.

PVX, PVS, and PVM are controlled by clonal selection during the multiplication of seed tubers, i.e. by observation, uprooting and discarding of those plants that show symptoms of virosis during their cultivation. This discarding is effective only when symptoms are evident; it is almost useless in those cases in which the infection is latent. There are cultivars with genetic resistance to PVX.

=== Andean Potato Mottle Virus and Andean Potato Latent Virus ===
Andean potato mottle virus (APMV) and Andean potato latent virus (APLV) are two common viral diseases in the potato-growing areas of the Andean plateau of Peru, Bolivia and Argentina. Both are transmitted by contact and by insect vectors. Unlike the previous viruses, the vectors in these two cases are not aphids but beetles. APMV usually produces a mild to severe mottling (irregular arrangement of dark and light areas on leaves). Cultivars more sensitive to this virus may react to infection with apex necrosis, leaf deformations, dwarfing and/or delayed emergence. APLV is usually dormant but often causes chlorosis, or soft mosaics and leaf roughness. APLV is transmitted by the "potato pulp beetle" (Epitrix sp.), while APMV is transmitted by the "green leaf beetle" (Diabrotica sp.). Both viruses are also transmitted by mechanical contact between plants. The relative impact of both viruses on potato yields is unknown, although it is speculated that the effect of APMV may be more severe on susceptible cultivars.

The most effective control of both viruses is by clonal selection during seed tuber propagation and by uprooting and discarding diseased plants.

=== Potato mop-top virus ===
Potato mop-top virus (PMTV), also known as potato stem dwarfism virus, is prevalent in growing regions with cold and humid climates, where it favors the spread of the fungal vector, Spongospora subterranea. Economic losses due to this virus can be very high; cases of up to 25% yield reduction have been reported. Moreover, such losses can be accompanied by reductions in tuber quality, making the tubers unmarketable. Tubers can become infected after planting, directly from the surrounding soil where the fungus vector lives.

The primary symptoms consist of the formation of brown or necrotic, ring-shaped spots on the tuber surface. These spots extend into the tuber as necrotic arcs. Towards the center of these necrotic rings there is usually a rot caused by the fungal vector. Symptoms on the aerial part of the plants are secondary, subsequent to the subterranean infection and can be of three types. Stem dwarfing ("mop-top", origin of the virus name), bright yellow spots (called "aucuba" spots) especially on the lower leaves and pale V-shaped spots on the upper leaves. Occasionally, only some of the stems of a plant are infected while the remaining stems remain healthy and symptomless.

After infection and appearance of symptoms in the aerial part of the plant, secondary symptoms may appear in the tubers, which consist of deformations, deep cracks in the flesh, fine cracks on the surface, and brown ring-shaped spots at the apex of the stolons. The virus survives in the soil within the Spongospora fungus and spreads to other areas within the vector spores.

Regarding the control of this disease, treatment of infected soil with fungicides can prevent infection of a healthy crop by eradicating the virus vector. Discarding diseased plants is an effective control measure in highly susceptible cultivars.

=== Aucuba leaf ===
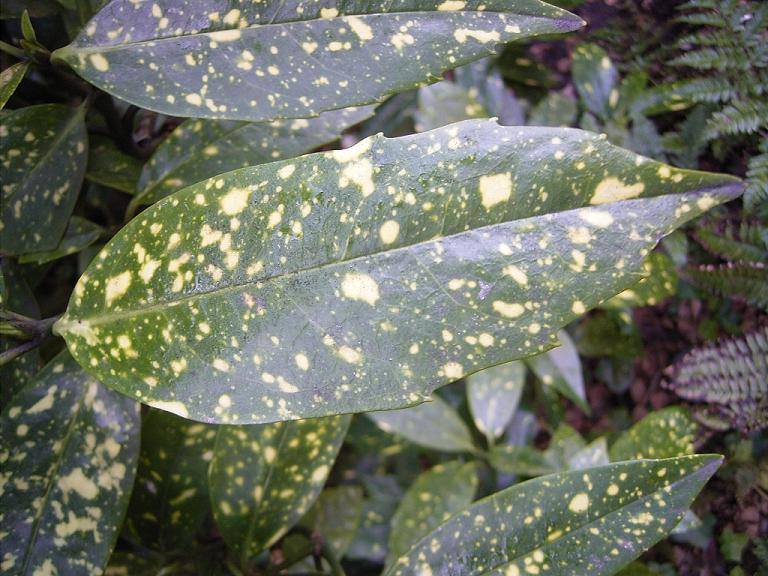
Surface view of an Aucuba japonica leaf. The type, color and distribution of the yellow spots on this leaf perfectly describe the symptoms of various potato viruses, hence collectively these are known as "aucuba leaf".

Different viruses cause the same symptom on the leaves of affected potato plants, which is called "aucuba leaf". This symptom consists in the presence of bright yellow spots of different sizes, which may appear with yellowing around the nerves. In some cases the leaflets turn completely yellow. This symptom is called "aucuba leaf" or simply "aucuba" because of its similarity to the normal leaves of the species Aucuba japonica. The consequences of these viruses are a decrease in yield and, in some cases, the quality of the tubers can be drastically affected by the presence of spots on the tubers that can become necrotic.

The viruses that usually produce these symptoms in potato are "alfalfa mosaic virus" (AMV), potato aucuba mosaic virus (PAMV), tobacco ringspot (TRSV), potato black ringspot (PBRSV) and tomato ringspot (TBRV). The importance of these diseases, which generally occur under cool temperature conditions, depends on the causal virus and the potato cultivar affected.

Control consists of discarding plants with symptoms during seed tuber production and by applying chemicals to kill the virus vector, which differs from case to case. Thus, the vectors are aphids in the case of AMV and PAMV, and nematodes in the case of TFISV and TBRV.

=== Yellowing of potato veins ===
This virosis is quite frequent in some South American countries. Apparently, the causal agent is a virus, not yet characterized, transmitted by the whitefly Trialeurodes vaporariorum. Symptoms become evident immediately after infection, and consist of a bright yellowing of the tertiary leaf veins. As the disease progresses, the secondary veins and leaf lamina turn yellow, sometimes without affecting the primary veins, which remain green. Affected plants have not been reported to show other symptoms such as dwarfing or weakness. However, the yield of affected plants may be reduced by up to 50%.

Insecticide applications to control the vector are not an effective method because they may even lead to an increase in disease incidence as populations of whitefly predatory insects are also affected. The most useful control method is to reduce the sources of infection by eliminating infected potato plants in and around the field, as well as Solanum nigrum weeds and other Solanum species related to tomato, which can be reservoirs of the virus. The successive cultivation of beans with potatoes should not be practiced because, under these conditions, vector populations increase. Planting seed potato tubers from disease-free areas helps to prevent the spread of the disease.

== Control methods ==
The control of potato virus diseases is based on preventive methods, such as the production of healthy (i.e. virus-free) seed and genetically controlled resistance or tolerance. However, the effectiveness of both methods depends on the existence of sensitive detection or diagnostic methods. These methods must also be simple and inexpensive so that they can be applied routinely over large areas of the crop. Serological methods such as ELISA and nucleic acid hybridization or PCR (polymerase chain reaction) techniques offer all these characteristics and are currently widely used during clonal selection for seed tuber production.

The production of healthy seed tubers is the most widely applied control method in potato breeding. With current diagnostic and micropropagation technology it is possible to start a program with completely healthy material obtained by tissue culture and its subsequent multiplication through successive generations avoiding or reducing reinfection.

Genetic resistance incorporated into cultivars allows the farmer to keep cultivars free or with low virus incidence for a greater number of vegetative multiplications. This process requires the search for effective resistance genes and their incorporation into commercially outstanding genotypes. It has been possible to use extreme resistance genes for PVY and PVX control by traditional breeding methods. In addition, it has been possible to identify a resistance gene to a race of PVX in an accession of Solanum sucrense. The case of PLRV is more complex due to the polygenic nature of the tolerance. However, genes for each of the tolerance factors have been identified in the world potato germplasm collection.

== Degeneration of potato cultivars ==
The use of seed tubers from virus-infected plants in successive cropping seasons was common in the past and is still common in developing countries. This management leads to cultivar degeneration that can result in yield decreases of more than 80%. On the other hand, the solution to this problem implies an increase in crop production costs because the farmer cannot use the tubers he has produced himself as seed and must look for a clean (virus-free) seed source, which usually represents a significant amount of the total cost. European farmers observed from the beginning of the 20th century that seed tubers from certain regions produced more than those from their own region. Thus began the commercial production of clean seed tubers in specific regions, an activity highly perfected and technified in many countries of the world. By the 18th century, long before what we now call viruses were known, potato degeneration was attributed to its repeated asexual propagation. Because of this belief, it was thought that sexual reproduction was necessary to rejuvenate and restore the yield potential of cultivars. The cause of aging was not correct, but the method of controlling viruses by breeding new cultivars through crosses worked well because many potato viruses, such as PVX, PVY, and PLRV, are not transmitted by seed of sexual origin (called botanical seed). Subsequently, however, these new cultivars also eventually degenerated, requiring the generation of new cultivars on an ongoing basis. In some regions of the world, in fact, tuber pieces are not used in commercial potato production, but seed of sexual origin is used instead. This strategy was first used in China in 1959.

Therefore, the most economical and effective alternatives to control potato degeneration are exactly the same as those necessary to control viruses in the crop: to obtain, on the one hand, seed tubers free of viruses and other pathogens through micropropagation or in vitro cultivation of potato varieties and, on the other hand, to develop new, more resistant cultivars through genetic improvement for virus resistance. The use of virus-resistant potato cultivars also reduces production costs since the farmer can produce his own seed for several generations.

== In vitro cultivation and production of virus-free seed tubers ==
One of the most technologically demanding crops for seed production is potato. As a perennial, it is exposed to attack by numerous pathogenic organisms such as fungi, bacteria and Viruses over a long period of time. In addition, and unlike other major crops, potatoes are reproduced vegetatively, as clones, which guarantees a stable, unalterable multiplication of the original genotype. However, tubers taken from diseased plants (particularly in the case of viruses) transmit the disease to the plants they generate. To avoid this, the tuber used as seed has to be produced under conditions of strict disease control, which increases the cost of propagation material and thus limits its availability or increases farmers' production costs.

Micropropagation offers an economical solution to the problem of the presence of pathogens in seed potatoes. The starting material consists of potato plants free of any viruses. Stem pieces with a bud are taken from these plants and grown in vitro. The buds produce new stems and new buds, which can initiate successive growing cycles. Such a strategy ensures exponential multiplication of the number of initial propagation units. Once the desired quantity is reached, the plants obtained are transferred to seedbeds with soil in greenhouses. Adequate control of environmental conditions and diagnosis by sophisticated techniques (ELISA or PCR) ensure that these plants are virus-free. Each one of them will finish its cycle producing several small tubers that will be grown in the field in the following season. The first tubers obtained from the small in vitro plants are called genetic seed, pre-basic or "microtubers".

The pre-basic seed is subsequently multiplied in the fields of cooperating farmers, obtaining registered seed, which is then sown again to produce the seed that, if it meets all the requirements, will be certified by a government service. As an example, the regulations of the National Seed Institute of Uruguay can also be consulted.

== Genetics and breeding for virus resistance ==
In the common gene pool of cultivated potato and its wild congeners are found a number of genes for immunity, resistance, hypersensitivity and tolerance to viruses whose effective use in crop breeding allows the development of new cultivars with increased levels of genetic resistance to these pathogens, or their vectors. Examples of such virus resistance mechanisms and their genetic basis are given below:

- Immunity

A cultivar is said to be immune to a given pathogen when, despite predisposing environmental conditions, infection does not occur. It normally covers all or a broad spectrum of virus variants and its effectiveness is not determined by temperature or other environmental variables. It is usually inherited as a single dominant (so-called monogenic) gene. It is the highest and most stable level of resistance that can be achieved. An example of immunity is provided by the Rxadg gene originally detected in clone "CPC 1673" of the subspecies andigena, which is immune to the Ro-1 and Ro-4 pathotypes of Globodera rostochiensis. The International Potato Center also has several clones of the andigene subspecies with immunity to PVX, which is supposed to be governed by the same Rxadg gene. Such is the case of clones "V-2 (CIP 375395.1)" and "LT-8 (CIP 379706.27)" and the Peruvian cultivars "Muru" and "Yana". In fact, the best option to improve for PVY resistance, for example, is the use of immunity. Immunity to PVY in S. stoloniferum was detected in 1944 and was later determined to be governed by a single dominant gene (Rysto). In S. hougasii the Ryhou gene also controls PVY immunity.

- Hypersensitivity

A cultivar is said to be hypersensitive or to show hypersensitivity reaction when, after infection, it restricts the virus to small, very localized areas, which immediately become necrotic. The virus, surrounded by dead tissue, is isolated and cannot continue infecting the remaining organs of the plant. In potato virus pathosystems, this type of reaction can be observed only under greenhouse conditions, under certain conditions of temperature and humidity. In fact, under field conditions, the hypersensitivity reaction is hardly noticeable and is easily confused with the immunity reaction, which is why this type of mechanism is also known as "field immunity". Several genes have been reported that govern non-specific hypersensitivity, i.e., encompassing the entire spectrum of variants of a given virus, following mechanical inoculation. Hypersensitivity to a particular and defined variant of a virus is generally inherited as a single dominant gene. In some pathosystems the hypersensitivity gene needs to be accompanied by recessive genes or polygenes for resistance to be effective.

An example of a hypersensitivity mechanism has been reported for clone "USDA 41956" and its derivatives, which have a dominant gene (called Rx) that can produce local necrotic lesions after infection with PVX. This gene would have originated in the Chilean cultivar "Villaroela" (belonging to the subspecies tuberosum) from which it later passed to the clone "USDA 41956".

- Relative resistance

A cultivar has relative resistance to a virus disease when, although infection occurs, only a small percentage of plants develop disease symptoms. In these cases, the reduction in yields depends on the percentage of infected plants and the effect of the infection on plant physiology. One or more resistance mechanisms against the virus may be involved, such as resistance to infection, resistance to multiplication, resistance to virus dissemination within the plant. Relative resistance also includes indirect mechanisms of resistance to the virus because the plant exhibits resistance to infection by the vector. These indirect mechanisms are called antibiosis and antixenosis. Antibiosis is the physiological mechanisms of the plant that affect the biology of the vector, such as its reproduction rate or its survival, development and movement. Antixenosis, on the other hand, is the non-preference or rejection of vectors by certain hosts due to the presence of volatile toxins or repellents produced by those plants.

Relative resistance is polygenic. Each of the physiological mechanisms that compose it may be governed by one or several genes. Relative resistance is quite general for all variants of the pathogen present in a given region. However, it is unstable because its effectiveness depends on the interaction with various environmental factors, especially temperature, vector, inoculum pressure, and the presence of other pathogens.

There are several examples of relative resistance mechanisms in potato. Thus, the wild potato species Solanum polyadenium, Solanum tarijense and Solanum berthaultii present "trichomes" or glandular hairs on leaves and stems, which discharge an exudate when mechanically damaged by aphids. In contact with atmospheric oxygen, the light-colored, water-soluble exudate contained in the glands changes to an insoluble black material that impedes the aphid's movement until it is completely immobilized. The aphid eventually dies, which leads to a reduction in its population size and its spread. This antibiosis mechanism reduces the dissemination of all viruses that require aphids as vectors. In clones "V-3" and "B-71.240.2" and cultivars "Bzura", "Tomasa", "Condemayta", "Pentland" and "Serrana", all resistant to PLRV, a low PLRV infection associated with an antixenosis mechanism that reduces insect colonization has been observed in these genotypes. The relative resistance of current potato cultivars can be traced in many cases to Solanum demissum hybrids with cultivated potato clones. Resistance to PLRV is also found in other wild species, such as Solanum acaule.

- Tolerance

A cultivar is said to be tolerant when all plants can be infected and show exactly the same symptoms as susceptible genotypes but do not show significant yield reductions. This mechanism, while useful in terms of reducing economic losses, is not appropriate for controlling viruses in the medium term, as tolerant cultivars are a major source of inoculum for other cultivars.

== Transgenesis and resistance to viruses ==
Since the first transgenic tobacco and petunia plants were obtained in 1983, a large number of papers have been published detailing the transfer of foreign genes to a growing number of plant species. Genetic engineering makes it possible to incorporate into plants new traits of agricultural interest that may come from other varieties of the same species, from other species or from phylogenetically distant organisms, such as bacteria or viruses.

Broadly speaking, there are two ways of genetically engineering plants to confer resistance to viruses: triggering resistance through the expression of genomic sequences derived from the target virus itself (called pathogen-derived resistance) or triggering resistance through the expression of non-viral genes that possess antiviral activity.

Using both approaches, several groups of researchers around the world have achieved transgenic potato plants that exhibit resistance to viruses. Thus, for example, plants transgenic for the PVX virus capsid are protected against inoculation with virus or viral RNA.

It was postulated that the capsid protein binds to the origin of assembly located at the 5' end of the viral RNA, thereby suppressing viral replicase translation. It is also possible that it inhibits cell-to-cell movement of PVX, as the capsid protein is an essential cofactor of systemic virus translocation. Phytolacca americana antiviral proteins form one of the major groups of proteins used as natural inhibitors of viral replication. Ph. americana proteins inactivate ribosomes (they belong to the RIP or ribosome inactivating protein family) and their exogenous application protects plants from viral infections. It was shown that expression of this protein in transgenic potato plants protected them against a variety of viruses, whether they were inoculated mechanically or by aphid vectors. The study of this resistance showed that the Ph. americana protein inhibits an initial step of the infection. These proteins are potentially toxic to the host plant. Transgenic potato plants with resistance to PVY, PVX and PLRV have been obtained by different mechanisms and are currently being evaluated and tested in different countries.

== Bibliography ==
- Salazar, L.F. (1997). Identificación y control de enfermedades virales y fitoplasmas de la papa (PDF) (in Spanish). 25–26 August 1997. Metepec, State of Mexico.: Simposium Internacional de la Papa. Archived from the original (PDF) on 2011-05-31.
- Centro Internacional de la papa (CIP) (1999). Principales Enfermedades, Nematodos a Insectos de la Papa (PDF) (in Spanish). Archived from the original (PDF) on 2011-05-31.
- Bertschinger, L.; Scheidegger, U.C.; Muñoz, J.; Hidalgo, A. (1995). Efecto de diferentes virus sobre el rendimiento potencial de la papa y su interacción con el estado de brotamiento de tubérculos-semilla en la costa del Perú (in Spanish). 7/8:36-54 36. Revista Latinoamericana de la Papa.
- Bertschinger, L.; Scheidegger, U. C.; Luther, K.; Pinillos, O.; Hidalgo, A. (1990). La incidencia de virus de papa en cultivares nativos y mejorados en la Sierra Peruana (in Spanish). 3:62–79. Revista Latinoamericana de la Papa.
- Santos Rojas, J. (1985). Efecto del Virus del Enrollamiento de la Hoja de la papa (PLRV) sobre el rendimiento total de cuatro variedades de papa en el sur de Chile (in Spanish). 55: 38. Simiente.
- Sheidegger, U. C.; Bertschinger, L.; Luther, K.; Pinillos, O.; Muñoz, J.; Hidalgo, A. (1922). Efecto de diferentes virus sobre el rendimiento potencial de la papa en la Sierra Central del Perú (in Spanish). 4. Revista Latinoamericana de la Papa.
- Wright, N. S. (1974). Combined effects of potato virus X and S on yield of Netted Gem and White Rose potatoes. Am. Potato J. 47: 475–478.
