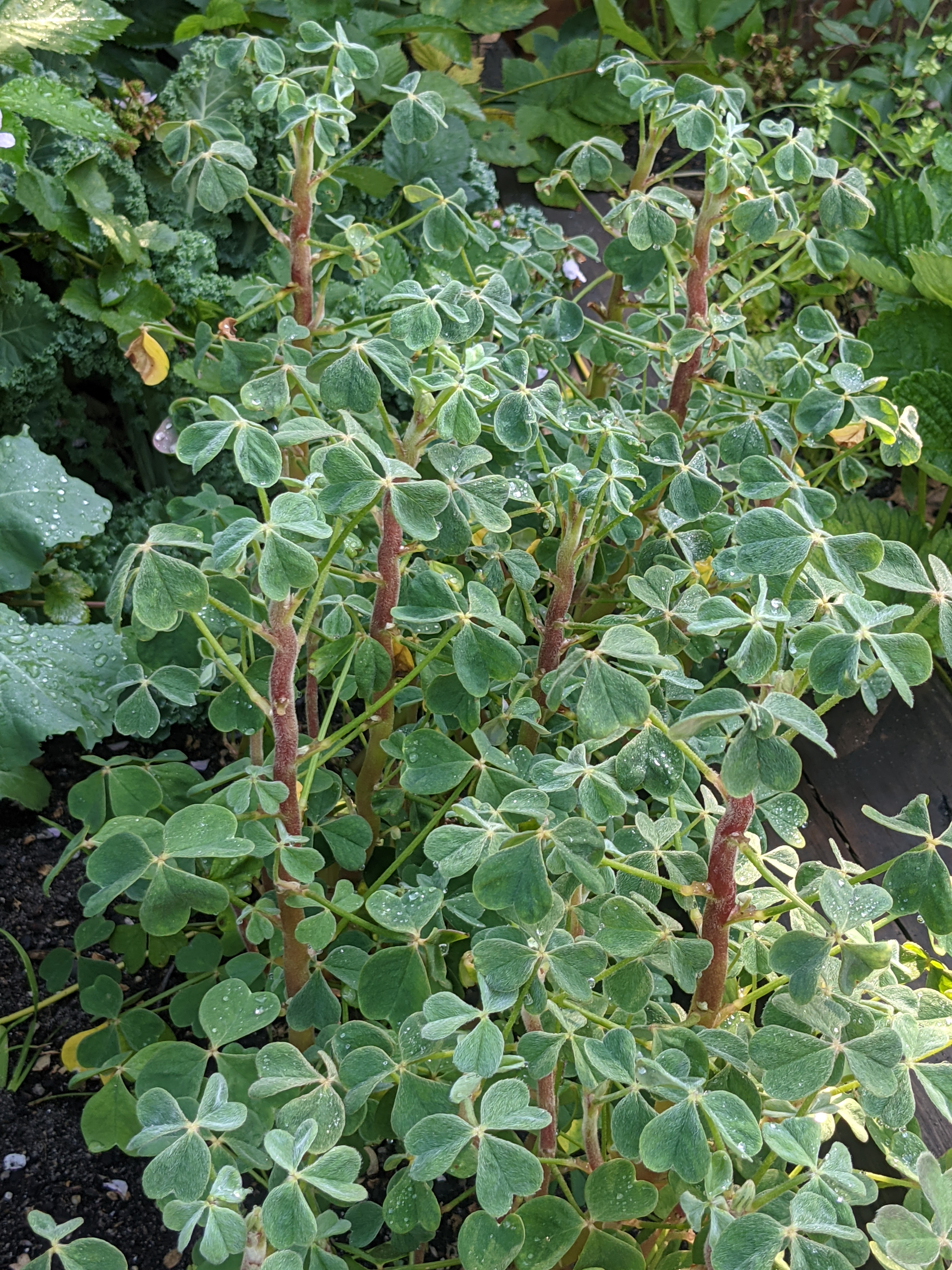
- Aboveground plant
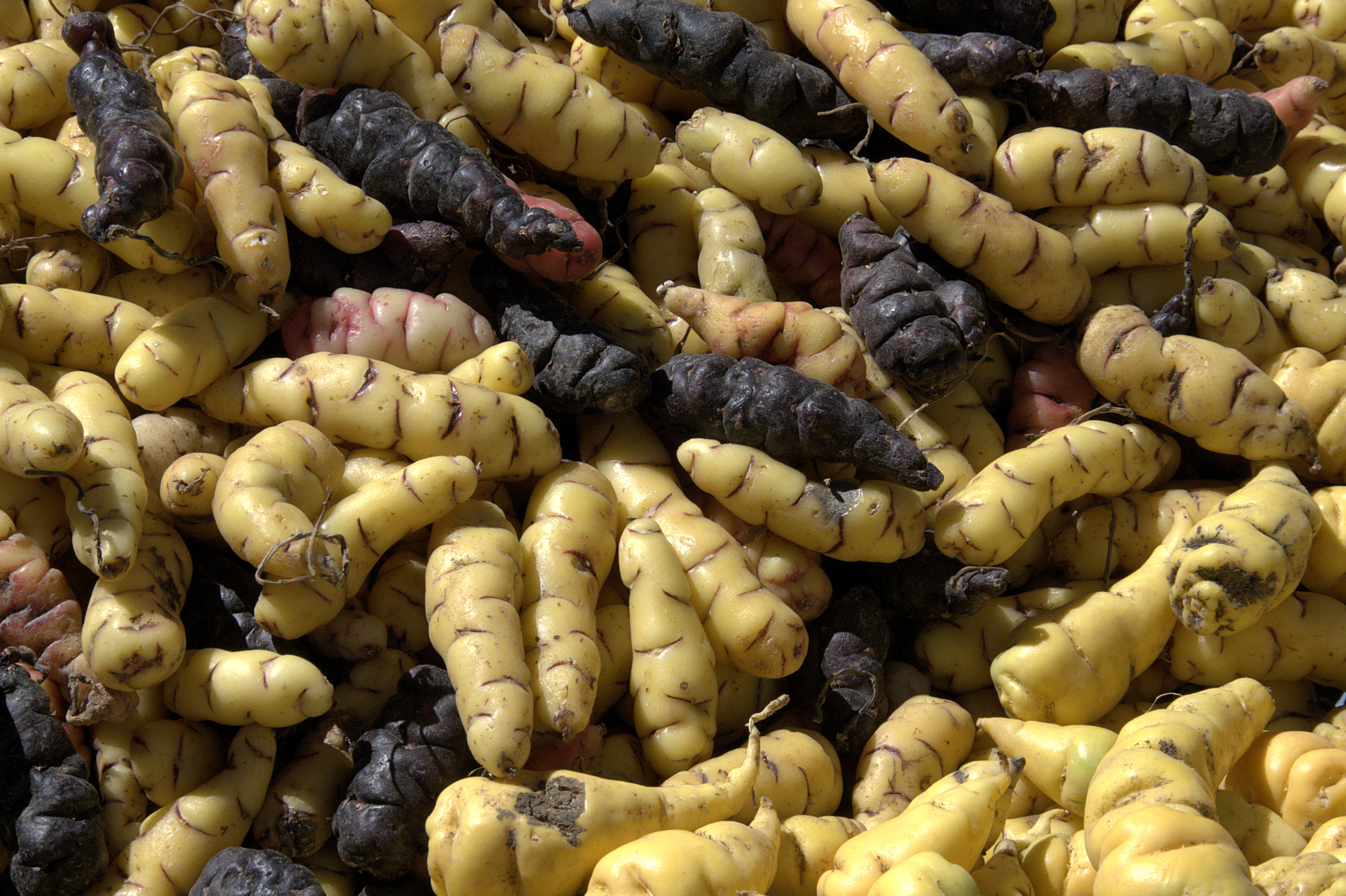
- Yellow and purple O. tuberosa tubers

Scientific classification
- Kingdom: Plantae
- Clade: Embryophytes
- Clade: Tracheophytes
- Clade: Spermatophytes
- Clade: Angiosperms
- Clade: Eudicots
- Clade: Rosids
- Order: Oxalidales
- Family: Oxalidaceae
- Genus: Oxalis
- Species: O. tuberosa

Binomial name
- Oxalis tuberosa Molina

Synonyms
- Acetosella tuberosa (Molina) Kuntze; Xanthoxalis tuberosa (Molina) Holub

= Oxalis tuberosa =

Species of plant

Oxalis tuberosa is a perennial herbaceous plant that overwinters as underground stem tubers. These tubers are known as uqa in Quechua, oca in Spanish, yams in New Zealand and several other alternative names. The plant was cultivated, apparently from its wild relatives, in the central and southern Andes for its tubers, which are used as a root vegetable. Resembling the potato, it was introduced to Europe and New Zealand around the 19th century.

== Description ==
Oca morphotypes are distinguished by foliar, floral, fruit, stem, and tuber characteristics, as described in the International Plant Genetic Resources Institute's document on oca descriptors. The morphological diversity of oca tubers, in particular, is astounding. Tubers range from 2.5 to 15 centimetres (1 to 6 inches) in length and 2.5 cm in width; the skin and flesh color may be white, cream, yellow, orange, pink, red, and/or purple and distributed in range of patterns.

== Distribution and habitat ==
The plant is not known in the wild, but populations of wild Oxalis species that bear smaller tubers are known from four areas of the central Andean region.

Oca is planted in the Andean region from Venezuela to Argentina, from 2,800 to 4,100 metres (9,200 to 13,500 feet) above sea level. Its highest abundance and most extraordinary diversity are in central Peru and northern Bolivia, the probable area of its domestication.

== Conservation efforts ==
Several ongoing ex situ and in situ conservation projects currently focus on the preservation of O. tuberosa diversity. The International Potato Center (CIP) in Peru has several hundred accessions of oca collected from regions in Bolivia, Argentina, and Peru to help ensure and maintain diversity. There are further efforts to collect accession of oca in regions where habitat destruction and pests threaten the diversity of wild oca accessions.

== Cultivation ==
Grown primarily by Quechua and Aymara farmers, oca has been a staple of rural Andean diets for centuries. Of all Andean root and tuber crops, it is currently second only to potato in area planted within the Central Andean region. Oca is essential to local food security because of its role in crop rotations and its high nutritional content.

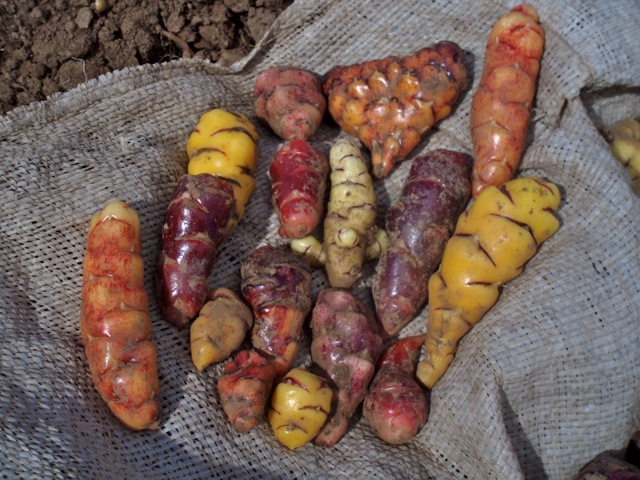
Modest display of O. tuberosa diversity on one farm in Peru

Andean farmers, including the indigenous Quechua and Aymara people, cultivate numerous varieties of oca. Oca diversity may be described with respect to morphological characters, local cultivar names, or molecular markers.

It was introduced to Europe in 1830 as a competitor to the potato, and to New Zealand as early as 1860. In New Zealand, oca has become a popular table vegetable and is called yams (although not a true yam). It is available in various colors, including yellow, orange, pink, apricot, and traditional red.

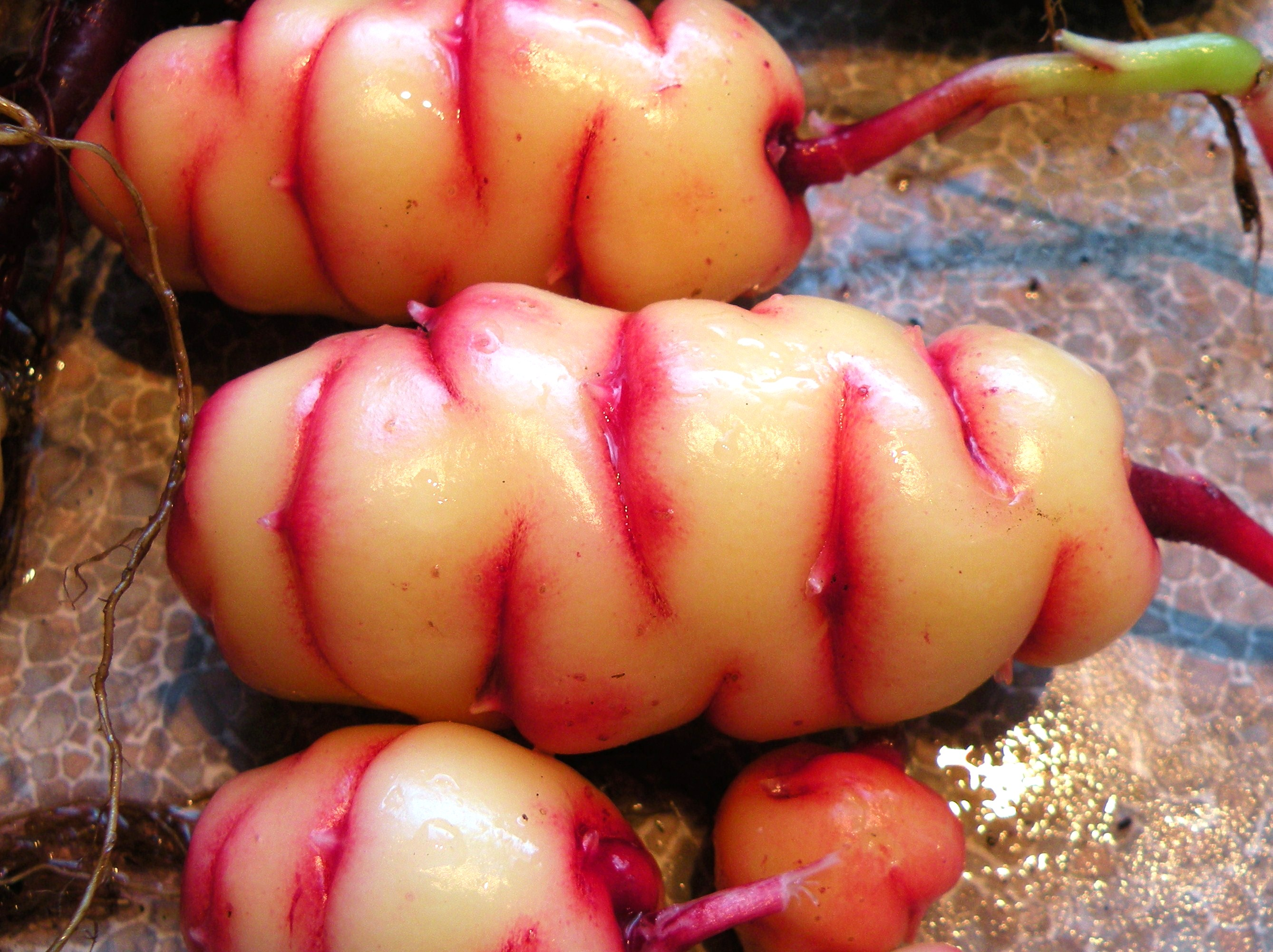
'Apricot' O. tuberosa tubers

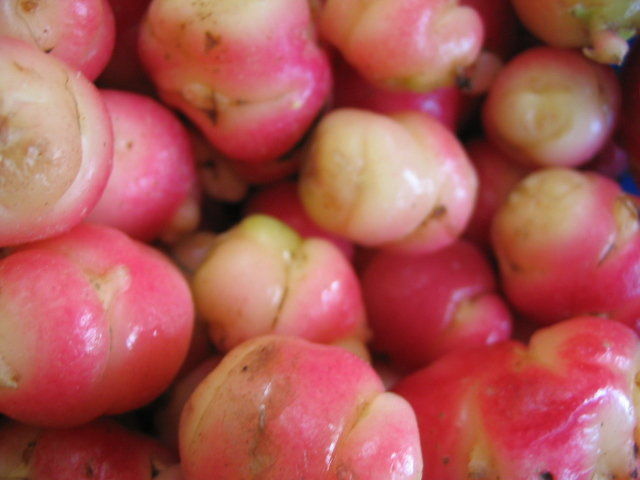
Pink O. tuberosa tubers

Oca is one of the important staple crops of the Andean highlands due to its easy propagation and tolerance for poor soil, high altitude, and harsh climates.

=== Climate requirements ===
Oca needs a long growing season and is day length dependent, forming tubers when the day length shortens in autumn (around March in the Andes). Additionally, oca requires climates with average temperatures of approximately 10 to 12 °C (ranging between 4 and 17 °C) and average precipitation of 700 to 885 millimetres (27 1/2 to 35 in) per year.

Oca requires short days to form tubers. Outside the tropics, it will not begin to form tubers until approximately the autumn equinox. The plant will die before producing tubers if frosts occur too soon after the autumn equinox. The presence of oxalates also limit its yield. Scientists work with specific breeding, selection, and virus-cleaning programs to enable maximal output.

=== Soil requirements ===
Oca grows with very low production inputs, generally on plots of marginal soil quality, and tolerates acidities between about pH 5.3 and 7.8. In traditional Andean cropping systems, it is often planted after potato and therefore benefits from persisting nutrients applied to, or leftover from, the potato crop.

=== Propagation ===
Oca is usually propagated vegetatively by planting whole tubers.

Propagation by seed is possible but is rarely used in practice. Sexual propagation is complicated by several factors. First, like many other species in the genus Oxalis, oca flowers exhibit tristylous heterostyly and are consequently subject to auto-incompatibility. Furthermore, on the rare occasion that oca plants do produce fruit, their loculicidal capsules dehisce spontaneously, making it difficult to harvest seed. Oca flowers are pollinated by insects (e.g., genera Apis, Megachile, and Bombus).

=== Cropping factors ===
Oca tuber seeds are planted in the Andes in August or September and harvested from April to June. The first flowers bloom around three to four months after planting, and the tubers also begin to form. Between planting and harvesting, the oca crop requires little tending, except for a couple of weedings and hillings.

Oca is a component of traditional crop rotations and is usually planted in a field directly after the potato harvest. A standard sequence in this rotation system may be one year of potato, one year of oca, one year of oats or faba beans, and two to four years fallow. Within this system, q’allpa is a Quechua term that signifies soil previously cultivated and prepared for the planting of a new crop.

The cultural practice is similar to potatoes. Planting is done in rows or hills 80–100 cm apart, with plants spaced 40–60 cm apart in the rows. Monoculture predominates, but interplanting with several other tuber species, including mashua and olluco, in one field is common in Andean production. Often, this intercropping consists of several different varieties of each species. Such mixed fields may later be sorted into tuber types during harvest or before cooking.

=== Pests and diseases ===
Pests and diseases limit the production of oca. Crops in the Andes are often infected with viruses, causing chronic yield depression. Adequate techniques to remove viruses have to be applied before the varieties can be used outside the Andean region. Cultivation is also constrained by the Andean potato weevil (Premnotrypes spp), ulluco weevil (Cylydrorhinus spp), and oca weevil, the identification of which remains uncertain (possibly Adioristidius, Mycrotrypes, or Premnotrypes). These weevils often destroy entire crops. Further notable pests are nematodes.

=== Yields ===
Yields vary with the cultural method. Annals from Andean countries report about 7–10 tonnes per hectare of O. tuberosa production. However, with adequate inputs and virus-free propagation material, oca production can range from 35 to 55 tonnes per hectare.

=== Local cultivar names ===
Oca-growing communities often name varieties based primarily on tuber morphology and secondarily on flavor. For example, common names may include ushpa negra (black ash) or puka panti (red Cosmos peucedanifolius). Great inconsistency of nomenclature has been reported within and among communities.

=== Molecular markers ===
Numerous studies have additionally described oca diversity through molecular approaches to study protein and genetic variation. Molecular markers, such as allozymes and inter-simple sequence repeats, show oca diversity to be low relative to other crops, probably because of its vegetative mode of propagation. While genetic differentiation corresponds well with folk classification, cluster analyses indicate that folk cultivars are not perfect clones, but rather genetically heterogeneous groupings.

== Edibility ==
Oca is cultivated primarily for its edible stem tuber, but the leaves and young shoots can also be eaten as a green vegetable. Mature stems can be used similarly to rhubarb. Andean communities have various methods to process and prepare tubers, and in Mexico oca is eaten raw with salt, lemon, and hot pepper. The flavor is often slightly tangy, but there is a considerable degree of flavor difference between varieties, and some are not acidic. Texture ranges from crunchy (like a carrot) when raw or undercooked, to starchy or mealy when fully cooked.

In Aotearoa New Zealand, they are first boiled 3-4 minutes, to remove the oxalates, until the skins are less pink. Then baked on a sheet pan in a tablespoon of vegetable oil at 200-220C for 20 minutes or until the skins are lightly browned.

=== Use categories ===
Oca is fairly high in oxalates, concentrated in the skin. Significant variation in oxalate concentration exists among varieties, and this variation distinguishes two oca use-categories recognized by Andean farmers.

One use category, sour oca, contains cultivars with high oxalic acid levels. Farmers process these tubers to form a usable storage product called khaya in Quechua. Tubers are first soaked in water for approximately one month to prepare khaya. Then they are left outside during hot, sunny days and cold, freezing nights until they become completely dehydrated. This process is similar to the preparation of chuñu from bitter potatoes. Cultivars in this use category are referred to in Quechua and Aymara as khaya (name of the dried, processed product) or p'usqu (sour/fermented), and in Aymara as luk’i.

The other use category, sweet oca, contains cultivars with lower oxalic acid levels. The traditional Andean preparation methods for this use category are also geared towards reducing the oxalate level of the harvested vegetable, but without dehydration. This is done by exposure to sunlight, which decreases the organic acid content and increases the oca's sweet taste. The concentration of oxalates is also reduced in the dehydrated product called khaya (similar to chuño).

Nutritional value
nutrient per 100 g	fresh	dried
Energy	255 kJ (61 kcal)	1,360 kJ (330 kcal)
Water (g)	84.1	15.3
Protein (g)	1.0	4.3
Carbohydrates (g)	13.3	75.4
Ash (g)	1.0	3.9
Calcium (mg)	2	52
Phosphorus (mg)	36	171
Iron (mg)	1.6	9.9
Retinol (μg)	1	0
Riboflavin (mg)	0.13	0.08
Niacin (mg)	0.43	0.85
Vitamin C (mg)	38.4	2.4

Once exposed to sunlight, oca can be boiled, baked, or fried. In the Andes it is used in stews and soups, served like potatoes, or can be served as a sweet. Cultivars in this category are referred to in Quechua as wayk'u (boiling), misk'i (sweet/delicious) and in Aymara as q'ini.

Sour oca and sweet oca form distinct genetic clusters based on AFLP data. This suggests the possibility of distinct evolutionary histories for each use-category.

=== Nutrition ===
Oca is a source of carbohydrates, dietary minerals, and protein. Cultivars vary substantially in nutritional content.

== Alternative names ==
- Apilla in Bolivia
- Apiña in Bolivia and Peru
- Batata-baroa or mandioquinha (literally, 'little mandioca') in Brazil, a name shared with the unrelated arracacha
- Cuiba or quiba in Venezuela
- Hibia or cubio in Colombia
- Macachin or miquichi in Venezuela
- Papa extranjera in Mexico
- Huasisai, qua or ibi in Peru,
- Truffette acide in France
- Yam in New Zealand, where the Dioscorea vegetables known elsewhere as yams are uncommon

== See also ==
- New World crops
- Tropaeolum tuberosum
- Ullucus
- Yacón
