= Wild potato =

Wild potato may refer to:

- Several species belonging to the genus Solanum section Petota, such as Solanum jamesii, Solanum berthaultii, etc.
- Thladiantha dubia (not related to potato)
- Hedysarum alpinum, a species of flowering plant in the legume family called wild potato by the Iñupiat.
