= Potato black ringspot virus =

Virus classification
- (unranked): Virus
- Realm: Riboviria
- Kingdom: Orthornavirae
- Phylum: Pisuviricota
- Class: Pisoniviricetes
- Order: Picornavirales
- Family: Secoviridae
- Genus: Nepovirus
- Species: Nepovirus solani

Synonyms
- potato calico strain of tobacco ringspot virus Andean potato calico strain of tobacco ringspot virus

Species of virus

Potato black ringspot virus (PBRSV) is a plant pathogenic virus of the family Secoviridae.

== See also ==
- Viral diseases of potato
