= Potato virus M =

Virus classification
- (unranked): Virus
- Realm: Riboviria
- Kingdom: Orthornavirae
- Phylum: Kitrinoviricota
- Class: Alsuviricetes
- Order: Tymovirales
- Family: Betaflexiviridae
- Genus: Carlavirus
- Species: Carlavirus misolani

Synonyms
- Kartoffel-K-Virus; Kartoffel-Rollmosaik-Virus; Potato paracrinkle virus; Potato virus E

Species of plant virus

Potato virus M (PVM) is a plant pathogenic virus in the family Betaflexiviridae. PVM can infect plants in the family Solanaceae, and it's an economically important pathogen of potato and pepino worldwide.

== Hosts and symptoms ==
PVM was first isolated from potatoes in 1923, in the United States. It was also identified from other New World plants, such as pepino, tomato and tobacco.

PVM is naturally transmitted by aphids in a non-persistent manner, however poor cultural practices can cause up to 50% crop loss by mechanical means and infected seed tubers.

PVM is detected in mixed infections of potatoes along with other viruses, but it can also cause damage in single infections. In single infections of potato, PVM causes mild leaf symptoms, such as mottling, mosaic, crinkling and rolling of leaves, and necrosis, shoot and plant stunting. In comparison to healthy tubers, PVM lowers the yield of starch by 0.96%, affects the size of starch granules, and increases amylose, ash and phosphate content in the affected tuber.

PVM is less damaging in other hosts. In the common bean it causes necrotic spots and lesions. In tomato plants, it can cause the leaves to turn yellow. In the amaranth its symptoms are chlorotic rings and necrotic spots. In quinoa it can cause chlorotic lesions.

== Properties ==
PVM capsid is a rod-shaped or slightly curved filament with dimensions of 650 x 12 nm.

PVM possesses a +ssRNA genome that is 8.5 kb in length. The RNA strand has a 5' cap and a 3' poly-A tail in order to resemble mature eukaryotic RNA.

The RNA genome encodes six open reading frames (ORFs) that produce several viral proteins. ORF 1 encodes a replicase that has three domains: methyltransferase, helicase and RNA-dependent RNA polymerase. ORF 2, 3 and 4 overlap one another and are collectively referred to as the triple gene block. These proteins are involved in membrane binding, cell-to-cell movement of virions and RNA silencing. ORF 5 encodes the coat protein, and ORF 6 encodes a protein capable of binding with RNA and DNA and suppress RNA silencing.

== See also ==
- Viral diseases of potato
