= Potato aucuba mosaic virus =

Virus classification
- (unranked): Virus
- Realm: Riboviria
- Kingdom: Orthornavirae
- Phylum: Kitrinoviricota
- Class: Alsuviricetes
- Order: Tymovirales
- Family: Alphaflexiviridae
- Genus: Potexvirus
- Species: Potexvirus marmoraucuba

Synonyms
- Potato G virus; Potato virus F; Tuber blotch virus

Species of virus

Potato aucuba mosaic virus (PAMV) is a plant pathogenic virus of the family Alphaflexiviridae.

== See also ==
- Viral diseases of potato
