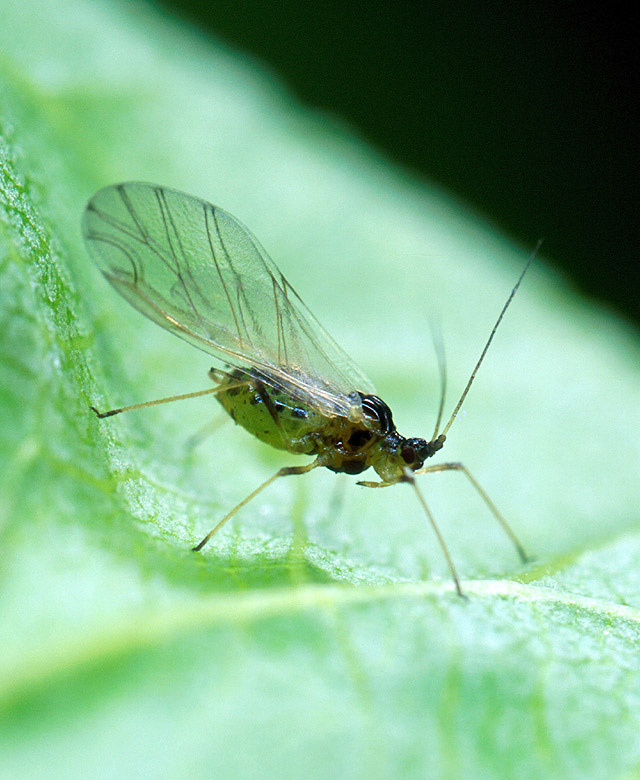

Scientific classification
- Kingdom: Animalia
- Phylum: Arthropoda
- Clade: Pancrustacea
- Class: Insecta
- Order: Hemiptera
- Suborder: Sternorrhyncha
- Family: Aphididae
- Genus: Myzus
- Species: M. persicae

Binomial name
- Myzus persicae (Sulzer, 1776)

= Myzus persicae =

Aphid of peach, potato, other crops

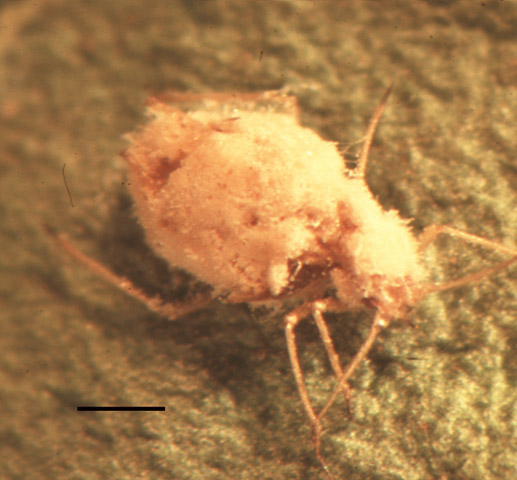
Green peach aphid that has been killed by the fungus Pandora neoaphidis Scale bar = 0.3 mm.

Myzus persicae, known as the green peach aphid, greenfly, or the peach-potato aphid, is a small green aphid belonging to the order Hemiptera. It is the most significant aphid pest of peach trees, causing decreased growth, shrivelling of the leaves and the death of various tissues. It also acts as a vector for the transport of plant viruses such as cucumber mosaic virus (CMV), potato virus Y (PVY) and tobacco etch virus (TEV). Potato virus Y and potato leafroll virus can be passed to members of the nightshade/potato family (Solanaceae), and various mosaic viruses to many other food crops.

Originally described by Swiss entomologist Johann Heinrich Sulzer in 1776, its specific name is derived from the Latin genitive persicae, "of the peach". The syntype specimen of this species is located in the Illinois Natural History Survey Insect Collection.

== Life cycle ==
Life cycle of the green peach aphid varies depending on temperature. A fully completed generation takes approximately 10 to 12 days with over 20 annual generations reported in mild climates. Aphids overwinter on Prunus plants and once plants break their dormancy, the eggs hatch and nymphs feed on the flowers, young foliage and stems of the plant. After several generations, winged individuals deposit nymphs on summer hosts. In cold climates, adults will return to Prunus plants in the autumn, where mating occurs and eggs are then deposited. All generations except the autumn generation culminating in egg production are parthenogenetic (non-sexual). Females give birth to offspring 6–17 days after birth, with an average age of 10.8 days at first birth. Length of reproduction varies but averages 14.8 days. Average length of life is approximately 23 days, without the presence of predators. The worst damage on plants is in the early summertime for the aphid breeding peak, because winged dispersants from Prunus spp. where the egg of overwintering aphid stage deposit nymphs on summer hosts migrating to tobacco, potatoes and cruciferous vegetables to be harmful continuously after a few generations.

== Distribution ==
The green peach aphid is found worldwide but is likely of Asian origin, much like its primary host plant, Prunus persica. This species does not prefer areas of extreme temperature or humidity. These particular aphids can be transported great distances by wind and storms. However, previous studies suggest that long-distance migration is uncommon in M. persicae, thus the spread of diverse genotypes over distance geographic regions is likely a result of anthropogenic influence.

These insects are not only a pest towards field crops, but tend to invade greenhouses as well. Thus, when young plants are infested by these aphids in greenhouses and are then transported to other locations, they are widely distributed. This explains their great distribution lengths, as well as their ability of high survival in areas with inclement weather and their ability to be readily transported on plant material.

This species has been introduced into 16 countries or islands (see global distribution figure). It is found in terrestrial habitats, and as mentioned previously, its native range is likely of Asia-Temperate origin. Its European Nature Information System (EUNIS) habitat is classified as lines of trees, small anthropogenic woodlands, recently felled woodland, early-stage woodland and coppice.

== Description ==
=== Morphology ===
Eggs of this species measure about 0.6 millimetres (0.024 in) long and 0.3 millimetres (0.012 in) wide, and are elliptical in shape. The eggs are initially yellow or green but turn black. The nymphs are initially green, but soon turn yellowish and resemble the viviparous adults. Nymphs that give rise to winged females may be pinkish.

Adult winged aphids have a black head and thorax, and a yellowish green abdomen with a large dark dorsal patch. They measure approximately 1.8 to 2.1 millimetres (0.071 to 0.083 in) in length. The wingless adult aphids are yellowish or greenish in colour, with the possibility of medial and lateral green strips being present. Their cornicles match their body colour, are moderately long and unevenly swollen along their length. The appendages are pale. The adult green peach aphid can be yellowish-green, red, or brown in colour because of morphological differences influenced primarily by the host plants, nutrition, and temperature.

Distinguishing morphological traits from this group include their convergent inner faces of the antennal tubercles in dorsal view, and the slightly clavate siphunculi which are dark-tipped and approximately as long as the terminal process of the antenna.

=== Reproduction ===
The green peach aphid normally reproduces through cyclical parthenogenesis, where there are several generations of apomictic parthenogenesis followed by a single sexual generation. Mating takes place on the primary host, where eggs are laid and undergo diapause over winter, and when spring comes, the parthenogenetic females hatch in spring and their descendants disperse to secondary host plants where they produce numerous parthenogenetic (asexual) generations. This species accepts secondary host plants across 40 different families, many of which are important crops economically. Due to decreasing day lengths and temperature in autumn, sexual morphs of this species are formed. Some genotypes have lost the ability to sexually reproduce and thus reproduce through parthenogenesis on secondary hosts throughout the year. These types are known as obligate parthenogens.

=== Habitat ===
Host plants of this species during overwintering include tree hosts from the genus Prunus, particularly peach, peach hybrids and apricot and plum trees. During the summer, aphids abandon woody tree hosts for herbaceous hosts which include vegetable crops in the following families: Solanaceae, Chenopodiaceae, Compositae, Brassicaceae, and Cucurbitaceae. Crops differ in their susceptibility to green peach aphid, but it is actively growing plants, or the youngest plant tissue, that most often harbors large aphid populations. Once the aphids have established colonies, some redistribution may occur throughout the progress of the infestation, and before overcrowding obscures preferences.

=== Predation ===
Natural enemies of the green peach aphid include lady beetles, soldier beetles, hoverflies, acalyptrate flies, gall midges, flower bugs, leaf bugs, damsel bugs, stink bugs, lacewings, parasitic wasps, mites, fungal pathogens as well as other aphids. Many of the natural enemies of the green peach aphid are limited to them due to their certain chosen habitat or by unsuitability of other aphid species as food. Most enemies of the peach green aphid are general predators that move freely in nearby habitats. Many of their enemies are influenced by the host plant, crop cultural practices and environmental conditions.

=== Food habits ===
Some groups of aphids feed predominantly in the parenchymal tissue of plants while most aphid species feed on the phloem sap. The green peach aphid ingests sugary fluids via a membrane. While feeding on a plant long term, Myzus persicae can uptake chloroplast DNA, even though the chloroplasts themselves are uninjured. Process of exudation from M. persicae stylets is exhibited to ingest phloem sap on plants with assisted pressure within the plants. On artificial diets, this species is also able to ingest food from a source with negligible pressure and can even produce honeydew on certain artificial diets.

=== Genetics ===
The green peach aphid has 2n=12 chromosomes normally, but there is a form of a chromosomal translation seen worldwide that is relatively common. M. persicae is a highly variable species; strains, races and biotypes have been distinguished by morphology, color, biology, host-plant preference, ability to transmit viruses and insecticide resistance.

This species is a great model for the study of chromosome arrangements since numerous variations regarding both chromosome number and structure have been reported. For instance, several populations of M. persicae were heterozygous for a translocation between autosomes 1 and 3. This rearrangement is involved in the resistance to organophosphate and to carbamate insecticides. Hybridization can occur in these species in regions where the two forms have both a sexual phase on peach which may suggest why certain aphids have the same genes for insecticide resistance.

There have been identifications of M. persicae populations with 13 chromosomes in various countries and diverse fragmentations of the autosome (A) 3, suggesting that different naturally occurring rearrangements of the same chromosomes may be present in the aphid karyotype.

The tobacco specialist subspecies, M. persicae nicotianae, known as the tobacco aphid, is a great example of speciation events that occur in the green peach aphid's evolutionary history. For instance, this subspecies has preserved its genomic integrity throughout time across a wide geographical scale by maintaining its primarily asexual life cycle.

==== Genome accessibility and importance ====
In GenBank, several genomes from Myzus persicae has been assembled. It is found to have approximately 17,000 genes, with a total of approximate 350 million base pairs. RNAi (RNA interference) can impede pest reproduction which is why the understanding of this species genome is important. With this understanding, future methods of pest control can be conducted and controlled for.

=== Conservation status ===
Under IUCN, and CITES no information is present on their conservation status. Given that they are an invasive pest distributed worldwide, they are not a species of concern in terms of endangerment.

== Pest impact ==
The presence of the green peach aphid can be detrimental to the quality of the crops. In superfluous numbers, it causes water stress, wilt, and reduces the growth rate of the plant. Prolonged aphid infestation can cause an appreciable reduction in the yield of root crops and foliage crops.

The green peach aphid transmits several destructive viruses in pepper including pepper potyviruses and cucumber mosaic viruses, which causes plants to turn yellow and the leaves to curl downward and inward from the edges. It also is capable of transmitting the Potato leafroll virus (PLRV), which can lead to yield reductions of 40-70%.

The green peach aphid can colonize over 100 plant species from 40 diverse families. This is in contrast to other aphid species that tend to specialize on a limited number of hosts, or consist of several host-adapted biotypes that specialize on a subset of the total host range. Through aphids sucking the phloem sap from plants, these plants can lose the nutrients and inhibit their growth and development. Its excreta (honeydew) accumulates on the leaves of crops, encouraging mold growth and affecting their growth and quality. This aphid is also a major vector for the transport of plant viruses and is known to be capable of transmitting over 100 different plant viruses, thus being the world's most versatile aphid viral vector.

== Pest control ==
=== Physical and mechanical control ===
One useful control measure is to take advantage of the negative taxis the green peach aphid has; hanging silver-grey film or using silver grey film nets to cover field crops can inhibit their landing and settlement. Adults can be trapped by taking advantage of their preference for sweet or sour materials. Thus, a 20:2:1 solution of water, vinegar, and brown sugar can be used to trap and kill them.

=== Farming practices ===
Farmers usually fight against the green peach aphid through efficacious cultural practices. Adjusting the planting layout; adjusting the sowing time and harvest time; deep plowing and winter turning over; appropriate use of crop fertilizers and timely drainage and irrigation can all be used to minimize the impact.

=== Chemical control ===
It is commonly believed that cypermethrin, abamectin, chlorpyrifos, methylamine and imidacloprid could be the first chemical agents for aphid control in the field. Although imidacloprid is a good insecticide for the control of pests who have piercing-sucking mouthparts, frequent reuse may lead to the severe resistance of pests.

The application of plant secondary substances also plays a pivotal role in population control since people are increasingly putting a premium on environmental protection and sustainable agriculture.

Insect growth regulators like diflubenzuron, chlorbenzuron, and botanical pesticides like nicotine and azadirachtin also manage the orchard-pest ecology, reducing the number of the green peach aphids and the damage they cause. Similarly, the application of artificial insect pheromone or pest induction signal compounds in the field to control pests and attract natural enemies has obtained effective results: E-β-farnesene (EβF), the aphid alarm pheromone, can interfere with aphid location and feeding, and also attract a variety of aphids' natural enemies to control the aphid population.

== Economic importance ==
Green peach aphids will transmit viruses to crops that they do not colonize, in which insecticides have little to no effect on virus transmission. Aphids are difficult to kill with contact insecticides because they are often under the leaves, or in sheltered areas of plants. Since they are able to colonize on a diverse amount of host plants and reproduce relatively fast, they are able to infect and damage a large amount of crop species while being highly insecticide resistant. This largely affects the production and selling of crops globally, having high economic concerns if this species is not controlled for.
