= Solanum apical leaf curling virus =

Solanum apical leaf curl virus

Virus classification
- (unranked): Virus
- Realm: Monodnaviria
- Kingdom: Shotokuvirae
- Phylum: Cressdnaviricota
- Class: Repensiviricetes
- Order: Geplafuvirales
- Family: Geminiviridae
- Genus: Begomovirus
- Virus: Solanum apical leaf curl virus

Synonyms
- Solanum apical leaf curling virus

Proposed species of plant pathogenic virus of the family Geminiviridae

Solanum apical leaf curl virus (SALCV) is a proposed species of plant pathogenic virus of the family Geminiviridae.
