= Aecidium cantensis =

Scientific classification
- Domain: Eukaryota
- Kingdom: Fungi
- Division: Basidiomycota
- Class: Pucciniomycetes
- Order: Pucciniales
- Family: incertae sedis
- Genus: Aecidium
- Species: A. cantense

Binomial name
- Aecidium cantense Arthur [as 'cantensis'] (1929)

Species of fungus

Aecidium cantense is a species of fungus in the Pucciniales order. It is a plant pathogen known from Peru. It grows and shows symptoms of yellowish-orangish pustules during mid-to-late stages of growth on potatoes (Solanum tuberosum).
