= Hendrik Marius Quanjer =

Dutch phytopathologist (1879–1961)

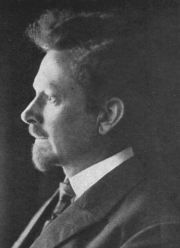

Hendrik Marius Quanjer (23 April 1879 – 1 March 1961) was a Dutch plant pathologist. He served as a professor of plant pathology at Wageningen and was among the first to introduce virology as an aspect of study in what was earlier focused on bacterial and fungal agents.

Quanjer was born at Enkhuizen to pharmacist Thomas Louis and Sophie Sara Wilhelmina Manikus. After school he went to the University of Amsterdam and studied medicine (1896-1904) and pharmacy. He qualified as a pharmacist but did not take up the profession. He became an assistant to J. Ritzema Bos in Amsterdam and began to study fungal diseases of plants. His dissertation on the diseases of cabbage led to a PhD (1906) from the University of Amsterdam. In 1906, the Institute for Phytopathology was started in Wageningen under Ritzema Bos and Quanjer moved as an assistant. He worked in Leiden University from 1910, lecturing in pharmacography but he resigned from the post. In 1918, Quanjer became a professor of plant pathology and mycology at Wageningen when it became a university. Quanjer examined the physiological processes involved in plant disease. He was able to detect viral leaf curl diseases in potato in 1916 and introduced virology as a part of plant pathology. Quanjer served as rector magnificus in 1937 and retired in 1948.

Quanjer married Willemke Hermanus Steltman in 1906 and they had two daughters. He was also interested in art and painting from an early age having even wanted to become a painter. He later worked on portraits and floral works.
