= Andean potato mottle virus =

Andea potato mottle virus

Virus classification
- (unranked): Virus
- Realm: Riboviria
- Kingdom: Orthornavirae
- Phylum: Pisuviricota
- Class: Pisoniviricetes
- Order: Picornavirales
- Family: Secoviridae
- Genus: Comovirus
- Species: Comovirus andesense

Synonyms
- Potato Andean mottle virus

Species of virus

Andean potato mottle virus (APMoV) is a plant pathogenic virus of the genus Comovirus.

== See also ==
- Viral diseases of potato
