= Solanum berthaultii =

Scientific classification
- Kingdom: Plantae
- Clade: Tracheophytes
- Clade: Angiosperms
- Clade: Eudicots
- Clade: Asterids
- Order: Solanales
- Family: Solanaceae
- Genus: Solanum
- Species: S. berthaultii

Binomial name
- Solanum berthaultii Hawkes

Synonyms
- List: Solanum berthaultii f. zudanense (Cárdenas) Correll; Solanum flavoviridens Ochoa; Solanum litusinum Ochoa; Solanum tarijense Hawkes; Solanum tarijense var. pojoense (Cárdenas) Correll; Solanum trigalense Cárdenas; Solanum vallegrandense Cárdenas; Solanum vallegrandense var. pojoense Cárdenas; Solanum zudanense Cárdenas

Species of flowering plant

Solanum berthaultii (syn. Solanum tarijense) is a species of wild potato in the family Solanaceae, native to Bolivia and northwestern Argentina. It is being extensively studied for its resistance to Phytophthora infestans, the late potato blight, and for other traits to improve the domestic potato Solanum tuberosum.
