= Potato virus A =

Virus classification
- (unranked): Virus
- Realm: Riboviria
- Kingdom: Orthornavirae
- Phylum: Pisuviricota
- Class: Stelpaviricetes
- Order: Patatavirales
- Family: Potyviridae
- Genus: Potyvirus
- Species: Potyvirus atuberosi

Synonyms
- Potato mild mosaic virus Solanum virus 3

Species of virus

Potato virus A (PVA) is a plant pathogenic virus of the family Potyviridae.

== See also ==
- Viral diseases of potato
