= Andean potato latent virus =

Virus classification
- (unranked): Virus
- Realm: Riboviria
- Kingdom: Orthornavirae
- Phylum: Kitrinoviricota
- Class: Alsuviricetes
- Order: Tymovirales
- Family: Tymoviridae
- Genus: Tymovirus
- Species: Tymovirus latandigenum

Synonyms
- Potato Andean latent virus

Species of virus

Andean potato latent virus (APLV) is a plant pathogenic virus of the family Tymoviridae.

== See also ==
- Viral diseases of potato
