= Potato virus X =

Virus classification
- (unranked): Virus
- Realm: Riboviria
- Kingdom: Orthornavirae
- Phylum: Kitrinoviricota
- Class: Alsuviricetes
- Order: Tymovirales
- Family: Alphaflexiviridae
- Genus: Potexvirus
- Species: Potexvirus ecspotati

Synonyms
- Potato mild mosaic virus

Species of virus

Potato virus X (PVX) is a plant pathogenic virus of the family Alphaflexiviridae and the order Tymovirales.

PVX is found mainly in potatoes and is only transmitted mechanically. There are no insect or fungal vectors for this virus. This virus causes mild or no symptoms in most potato varieties, but when Potato virus Y is present, synergy between these two viruses causes severe symptoms in potatoes. The virion has helical symmetry and a deeply grooved, highly hydrated surface and is made of a single-stranded positive-sense RNA genome of approximately 6.4 kb. This is wrapped in approximately 1300 units of a single coat protein (CP) type, with 8.9 CP units per helix turn. The genome is capped at the 5′-end and poly-adenylated at the 3′-terminus. It contains five open reading frames (ORFs) encoding five proteins: the RNA-dependent RNA Polymerase (RdRP), the movement proteins encoded by three overlapping ORFs that form the Triple Gene Block module (TGBp1, TGBp2, and TGBp3), and the CP (coat protein).

Virus indexing and limited generation production of potato, which starts from disease-free tissue culture plantlets, has nearly eliminated this virus from many countries' potato supply.

== Hosts ==
Solanum tuberosum, Lycopersicon esculentum and Nicotiana tabacum.

== Use in research ==
Chapman et al. 1992 introduced the use of transgenic PVX as a plant transformation vector. It has since been used by Kumagai et al. 1995 in the discovery of what is now known as virus-induced gene silencing, by Thomas et al. 2001 to improve Kumagai's process, by De Kock et al. 2004 to investigate Nicotiana's Cf proteins and Cf genes and their production of host resistance responsive to pathogen extracellular protein 2 (ECP2) (and by others to investigate various other host–pathogen interactions in S. tuberosum, L. esculentum and N. tabacum) and by Tameling et al. 2007 to investigate plant nucleotide binding leucine-rich repeats (NB-LRRs).

== See also ==
- Viral diseases of potato
