= Potato virus S =

Virus classification
- (unranked): Virus
- Realm: Riboviria
- Kingdom: Orthornavirae
- Phylum: Kitrinoviricota
- Class: Alsuviricetes
- Order: Tymovirales
- Family: Betaflexiviridae
- Genus: Carlavirus
- Species: Carlavirus sigmasolani

Synonyms
- Pepino latent virus

Species of virus

Potato virus S (PVS) is a plant pathogenic virus. It was first reported in Netherlands. PVS causes mild or no symptoms in most potato varieties. It is common in potatoes in many regions and does not cause significant yield losses. Field-grown potatoes are not routinely screened for this virus because it is not considered economically important. However, PVS often present in mixed infections with other potato viruses, which may accentuate symptom severity.

== Genome and Phylogeny ==
The single-stranded, positive-sense RNA genome of PVS is approximately 8.5 kb in length and enclosed in its filamentous particle. This genome consists of a 5′ cap structure and an open reading frame (ORF) encoding an RNA-dependent RNA polymerase (RdRp), the triple gene-block proteins (TGBp1-3) involved in virus cell-to-cell movement, a NABP (cysteine-rich nucleic-acid-binding protein), and 34 kDa coat protein (CP). Phylogenetic analysis using non-recombinant sequences of the (i) 95 CP; and (ii) 130 complete ORF, RdRp, and TGB sequences from GenBank, found that the global isolates were positioned within three main phylogroups: PVSI, PVSII or PVSIII.

== See also ==
- Viral diseases of potato
