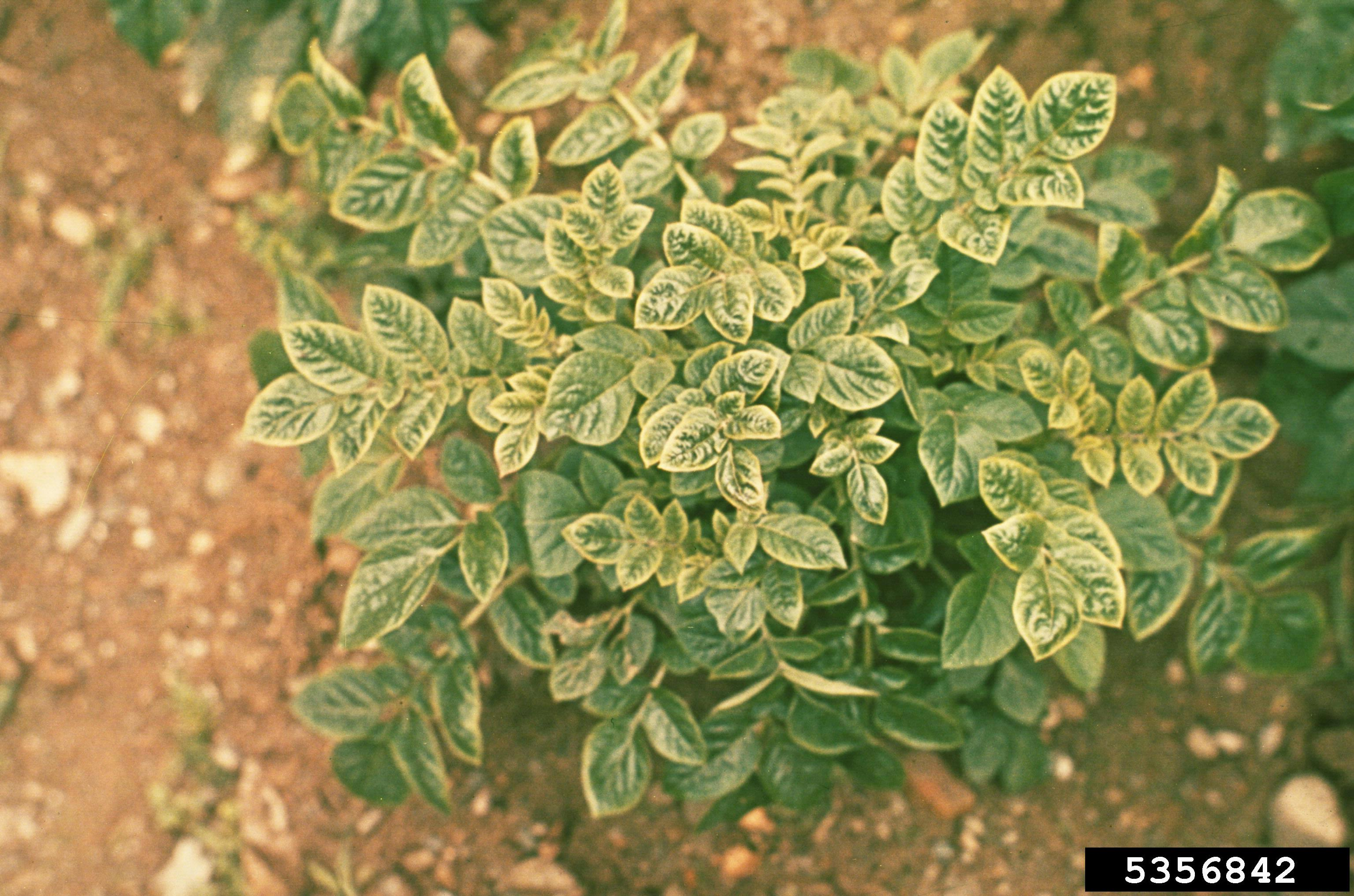
- A potato plant infected with Potato leafroll virus

Virus classification
- (unranked): Virus
- Realm: Riboviria
- Kingdom: Orthornavirae
- Phylum: Pisuviricota
- Class: Pisoniviricetes
- Order: Sobelivirales
- Family: Solemoviridae
- Genus: Polerovirus
- Species: Polerovirus PLRV

= Potato leafroll virus =

Species of virus

Potato leafroll virus (PLRV) is a member of the genus Polerovirus and family Solemoviridae. The phloem limited positive sense RNA virus infects potatoes and other members of the family Solanaceae. PLRV was first described by Hendrik Marius Quanjer et al. in 1916. PLRV is transmitted by aphids, primarily the green peach aphid, Myzus persicae. PLRV is one of the most important potato viruses worldwide but particularly devastating in countries with limited resources and management. It can be responsible for individual plant yield losses of over 50%. One estimate suggests that PLRV is responsible for an annual global yield loss of 20 million tons. Symptoms include chlorosis, necrosis and leaf curling.

== Hosts and symptoms ==
PLRV infects members of the family Solanaceae. The most economically important host is the potato, Solanum tuberosum spp. In potato, symptoms of primary infection, infection in the growing season, occurs in the youngest leaves. Leaf margins become necrotic, turning brown and purplish and curl inwards towards the center of the leaf. Secondary infection, which starts from infected potato culls, produces more severe symptoms. Leaf rolling is more apparent and the entire leaf can become chlorotic and sometimes also has a purple discoloration. Necrosis of the phloem tissue particularly in the haulm is observed after onset of symptoms. Plants infected with PLRV experience stunted growth and produce smaller tubers. Infected tubers retain normal shape but experience necrosis of the vascular tissue. Necrosis of the tuber may not be apparent at harvest and can develop in storage. This usually appears as small brown spots scattered throughout the tissue. Net necrosis of potato is the result of infection by potato leaf roll virus (PLRV). This symptom is caused by the selective death and damage to cells in the vascular tissues of the tuber. The fact that only specific cells within the tuber are affected by this problem while others remain normal causes the characteristic net symptom. Infection by the virus may directly cause the damage to and death of the vascular tissues or the presence of the virus may make these sensitive tissues more susceptible to damage from other stresses. There is a strong resemblance between PLRV net necrosis and another tuber defect known as stem end discoloration (SED). Unlike PLRV, SED is believed to be a physiological disorder.

The virus itself is an extremely small, nearly spherical particle with a diameter of 25 nanometres. It can be spread by several aphid species that colonize potato, with the green peach aphid being the most efficient. The insect vector is absolutely essential to spread because mechanical transmission, like that which occurs when the leaves of an infected plant rub on a healthy one, does not occur with PLRV. The infection process is actually quite complicated with this virus. First the aphid must acquire the virus by feeding on a PLRV infected plant. Then the virus must circulate from the gut of the aphid, through the circulatory system until it finally gets into the salivary glands, from which it can be excreted when the aphid feeds on healthy plants. Only after this has happened can the aphid spread the virus. This sequence of events may require 24 hr. or more to occur. Unfortunately, once an aphid becomes infected, it remains so for the rest of its life. Spread of the virus between plants within a field and between fields can be done by the winged forms of the aphid but most spread within a field, especially from infected plants to nearby, healthy ones, is accomplished by the wingless forms.

Seed certification programs allow only a very small level of PLRV in certified seed. In Idaho, for instance, during the second field inspection the allowable amount of PLRV is only 0.05% for G4 seed, 0.01% for G3 and G2 and none at all allowed in nuclear and G1. Very small percentages of PLRV in seed potatoes do not normally pose any risk for the commercial producer. However, even very small percentages of virus can be a problem if green peach aphids appear very early and in abundance. In years that are very favorable for insects, like the 1996 season was, the aphid population can become so large that even a very low percentage of PLRV infected seed could result in sufficient spread to cause a problem, because as the aphid population increases, so does the probability that they will encounter an infected plant. Control of aphids with insecticide application is the only means of managing this problem in production years that are highly favorable for aphids.

Seed borne infection generally results in small, stunted, badly impaired plants which have reduced yield both in tuber numbers and in tuber size. Large tubers that show the typical net necrosis symptom may well be the result of current season infection.

PLRV infects other hosts including moonflower, Datura stramonium causing interveinal necrosis and hairy nightshade, Solanum villosum causing chlorosis, leafroll and leathery texture of leaves. Husk tomato, Physalis floridana symptoms include chlorosis, rolling of the leaves and stunting. PLRV infects many other plants in the family Solanacea and can also infect some non-solanaceous plants.

Because of the wide array of symptoms that occur in different hosts, diagnosis of PLRV must be done based on the infected species. In potatoes PLRV is diagnosed by stunting and leafroll. Diagnosis of other species mentioned previously is by the above-mentioned symptoms. PLRV can be detected on site using PLRV AgriStrip-magnetic. This lateral flow test uses microbeads coated with an anti-body specific to PLRV. Virus particles are separated from the plant tissue using a powerful magnet. The PLRV AgriStrip-magnetic can detect low titers that were previously thought to be too low for traditional lateral flow tests.

== Disease cycle ==
PLRV can be introduced to potatoes by planting infected seeds or by insect vectors. The green peach aphid (Myzus persicae) is the primary vector of PLRV. Aphids acquire the virus by feeding on infected plants. The infected phloem is taken up through the aphid stylet into the digestive system. The virus then crosses the membrane of the gut and enters the hemocoel where it then can cross the membrane into the salivary glands. This process takes several hours, after which time the aphid will continue to transmit the virus for its remaining life. This process is known as persistent transmission. In temperate regions, the green peach aphid is able to persist through the winter by laying eggs in woody species of the genus Prunus. Eggs hatch in early spring, and early instar aphids feed on tree phloem until summer, when they switch to more preferred herbaceous hosts, including agricultural crops. During this time the green peach aphid can transmit PLRV present in weeds of the family Solanaceae to potatoes and other crops. Potato plants infected with PLRV will produce infected tubers. If infected tubers are planted they will give rise to infected plants. Aphids can also spread PLRV to tubers in storage, especially after they sprout. Winged aphids can be carried several hundred kilometers by wind currents, allowing for widespread infection.

== Environment ==
Because PLRV is transmitted by aphid vectors it is more prevalent in environments that are conducive to aphid development. Warm humid conditions are preferred, but aphids can thrive in a number of climates as long as it is not too hot and dry, as their soft bodies make them prone to desiccation. In the tropics, aphids persist year round but the efficiency of PLRV transmission is reduced at temperatures above 26 degrees Celsius. The optimal temperatures for the green peach aphid are between 13 and 19 degrees Celsius.

== Importance ==
PLRV is an economically important disease due to the yield loss it can cause. Along with other aphid vectored viruses PLRV causes an annual potato loss in the U.S. of 100 million dollars. Plants that are infected with the virus produce only small to medium tubers that are not preferable in market. When plants are grown from infected tubers yield can be reduced 33-50%. Since potatoes are produced by planting the tubers produced the previous season, PLRV is especially problematic in seed potato production. Plantings from infected tubers will not yield acceptable market quality potatoes and can cause a significant loss. Thus any amount of infection is above the economic threshold. In the United States the potato industry is an important source of revenue, with the top producing states in 2009 being Idaho ($735,250,000), Washington ($627,995,000) and Wisconsin ($246,330,000).

== Management ==
Since PLRV is persistently transmitted it makes for easier means of control. Studies have shown a minimum of twelve hours is required for the virus to be transmissible by an aphid. Therefore, PLRV can be controlled effectively by reducing aphid populations. Systemic and foliar insecticides can be used to prevent aphid feeding. Since virus takes several hours to be transmitted by aphids systemic insecticides are utilized and the aphid dies before it can transmit the virus. Foliar pesticides are utilized when colonizing aphid populations get too high and are useful as a knockdown method, to rapidly reduce aphid populations. Imidacloprid, Methamidophos and Endosulfan are commonly used in aphid control. One study found that ethyl-methyl parathion pesticides are less effective at controlling the green peach aphid at lower temperatures. At 25 degrees Celsius aphid mortality was 95%. At 17 degrees Celsius mortality was 90%, at 10 degrees Celsius mortality was 80%, and at 7 degrees Celsius mortality was 67%. This suggests that some chemical controls are more effective at higher temperatures. Other management strategies include sanitation and seed certification. Cleaning any volunteer tubers from a field reduces any reservoirs that may persist. Seed certification programs test seed lots utilizing ELISA for the detection of multiple potato viruses. Seed lots can then be rated by the amount of infection. Highly infected seed lots are rejected and not used the next season.

== See also ==
- Viroid
- Potato spindle tuber viroid
- Viral diseases of potato
