= Tepovirus =

Virus classification
- (unranked): Virus
- Realm: Riboviria
- Kingdom: Orthornavirae
- Phylum: Kitrinoviricota
- Class: Alsuviricetes
- Order: Tymovirales
- Family: Betaflexiviridae
- Subfamily: Trivirinae
- Genus: Tepovirus

Genus of viruses

Tepovirus is a genus of viruses in the order Tymovirales, in the family Betaflexiviridae. Plants as well as some other root and tuber crops in the andes serve as natural hosts. There are five species in this genus.

== Taxonomy ==
The following species are assigned to the genus, listed by scientific name and followed by the exemplar virus of the species:

- Tepovirus tafagavis, Agave virus T
- Tepovirus tafavii, Cherry virus T
- Tepovirus tafpruni, Prunus virus 1
- Tepovirus tafsolani, Potato virus T
- Tepovirus tafzosterae, Zostera virus T

== Structure ==
Viruses in Tepovirus are non-enveloped, with flexuous and filamentous geometries. The diameter is around 12 nm. Genomes are linear, around 6.5kb in length. The genome codes for 3 proteins.

Genus	Structure	Symmetry	Capsid	Genomic arrangement	Genomic segmentation
Tepovirus	Filamentous		Non-enveloped	Linear	Monopartite

== Life cycle ==
Viral replication is cytoplasmic. Entry into the host cell is achieved by penetration into the host cell. Replication follows the positive stranded RNA virus replication model. Positive stranded RNA virus transcription is the method of transcription. Plants as well as some other root and tuber crops in the Andes serve as the natural host. Transmission routes are seed borne and pollen associated.

Genus	Host details	Tissue tropism	Entry details	Release details	Replication site	Assembly site	Transmission
Tepovirus	Pome fruits; citrus; pear	None	Viral movement; mechanical inoculation	Viral movement	Cytoplasm	Cytoplasm	Grafting; propagating material
