= List of potato cultivars =

Banana cultivar
- External image

This is a list of potato varieties or cultivars. Potato cultivars can have a range of colours due to the accumulation of anthocyanins in the tubers. These potatoes also have coloured skin, but many varieties with pink or red skin have white or yellow flesh, as do the vast majority of cultivated potatoes. The yellow colour, more or less marked, is due to the presence of carotenoids. Varieties with coloured flesh are common among native Andean potatoes, but relatively rare among modern varieties. They are rarely cultivated because their yield is usually lower than that of improved varieties and are sought after by some amateurs as a curiosity.

== List ==
Name	Image	Country of origin	Year of introduction	Notes
Adirondack Blue		United States	2003	
Adirondack Red		United States	2003	
Agata		Netherlands	1976	
Agria		Germany	1985	
Ajanhuiri		Bolivia		
Almond		Sweden		
Alpine Russet		United States	2009	
Alturas		United States	2002	
Amandine		France	1993	
Allians		Germany	2003	
Amarilla		Peru		
Amflora			1996	Cultivation was initially permitted in Europe, but was later prohibited in 2013.
Andean black				
Annabelle		Netherlands	2001	
Anuschka		Germany	2004	
Anya		Scotland	1996	
Arran Victory		Scotland	1918	
Atlantic		United States	1978	
Atlas				
Augusta		Germany		
Austrian Crescent				
Avalanche		United Kingdom	1989	
Baccara				
Bamberg		Germany	1819	
Bamberger		Germany	1819	
Banana		Canada	1990	
Bannock Russet		United States	1999	
Barbara		Germany	1982	
Belana		Germany	2000	
Bellarosa		Germany	2004	
Belle de Fontenay		France	1885	
Berlichingen		Germany	1927	
BF-15				
Bildtstar		Netherlands	1984	
Bintje		Netherlands	1904	
Bionta		Austria	1993	
Black Champion		Ireland		
Blaue Hindelbank				
Blaue St. Galler		Switzerland		
Blaue Uttenwill				
Blaue Viola				
Blaue Vogtländer				
Blazer Russet		United States	2005	
Bloomer		Ireland	1936	
Blue Bell		France	2008	
Blue Christie				
Blue Congo				Also known as 'Blue Swede' or 'Idaho blue', the Blue Congo was voted the German "potato of the year" in 2006.
Bojar		Czechoslovakia	1945	
Bonnotte		France		
Brambory				
British Queen		Scotland	1894	
Butte		United States	1977	
Cabritas		Chile	1889	
Camota				
Camel		Netherlands	2013	Red
Canela Russet		United States		
Cara		Ireland	1973	Maincrop, blight resistant
Carola		Germany	1979	
Champion		Scotland	1863	
Charlotte		France	1981	Salad, blight resistant
Chelina				
Chérie		France	1997	
Cheyenne		France	2011	
Chiloé				
Ciclame				
Cielo				
Clavela Blanca				
Colette		Germany	1995	
Corte		Andahuaylas, Peru		
Cream of the Crop				From South America. Purple skin, slight whitish scab, blue when cooked.
Cultra		Ireland	1986	
Cyrano		Netherlands	2003	Origin of 'Cyrano' is the result of a cross made in 1991 between 'Goldstar' and HO86E423 at HZPC, Metslawier, the Netherlands.
Dejima		Japan	1971	
Désirée		Netherlands	1962	
Doré		Netherlands	1939	
Dos Color				
Duke of York		United Kingdom	1891	
Dutch Cream				
Early Fortune		Newfoundland	1820s	Possibly developed by Ann Hulan
Edelgard				
Edzell Blue		Scotland		
Eigenheimer		Netherlands		
Electra				
Ennstaler Alpe				
Espirit				
Estima				
Ewelina				
Fenton				
Fianna				
Filea				
Fingerling				
Finka				
Flava				
French Fingerling				
Gala				
German Butterball				
Golden Wonder		Scotland	1906	
Goldrush				
Hansa				
Heideniere				
Hela				
Hermanns Blaue				
Hermes		Austria		
Highland Burgundy Red		Scotland	1930s	
Holtgaster Blaue				
Home Guard		Scotland	1942	
Huayro		Peru		
Imilla		Bolivia		
Industrie				
Innovator				
Irish Cobbler				
Irish Lumper				
Irish White		Ireland	1882	
Jam				
Jazzy				
Jeanie Deans				
Jelly				
Jersey Royal		Jersey	1880	
Jubel				
Juliette				
Kennebec		United States	1941	
Kerr's Pink		Scotland	1907	
Kestrel			1992	
Keuka Gold				
King Edward		United Kingdom	1902	
Kipfler		Germany		
Kitaakari		Japan	1987	
Kuhbauch				
Lady Balfour				
Lady Rosetta				
Langlade				
Laura		Austria	1998	
Lenape		United States	1967	
Lima				
Linda potato				Was voted German "potato of the year 2007".
Linzer Blaue				
Linzer Delikatess				
Linzer Rose				
Linzer Speise				
Linzer Stärke				
Marabel				
Marcy		United States	1990	
Marfona		Netherlands	1975	
Maris Peer		United Kingdom	1962	
Maris Piper		United Kingdom	1966	
Marquis				
Mayan Queen				
May Queen		Japan		
Megachip			1985	
Melody				
Miss Blush				
Mizen		Ireland	1978	
Monalisa				
Mozart potato				
Mahil potato				
Lil key potato				
Negra Andina		Peru		
Nadine				
Navan		Northern Ireland	1987	Bred from Maris Piper. Well suited for frying.
Nicola				It was voted German "potato of the year 2016".
Nishiyutaka		Japan	1978	
Norddeutsche Inseln				
Norgold Russet				
Oldenburger Blaue				
Opperdoezer Ronde		Netherlands		
Orchestra				
Ostbote				
Ozette				
Pachacoña		Chile		
Parel				
Pentland Crown		United Kingdom		
Peruanische Blaue				
Pike		United States	1996	
Pink Eye		Tasmania, Australia		
Pink Fir Apple		France		
Piruanita		Cusco, Peru		
Präsident Krüger				
Primura				
Princess				
Professor Wohltmann				
Puca Quitish				
Puikula				
Quarta				
Ranger Russet		United States	1991	
Ratte				
Record				
Red Britain				
Red Gold		Canada	1970s	
Red La Soda		United States	1948	
Red Norland		United States		
Red Pontiac		United States		
Reichskanzler				
Remarka				
Rooster		Ireland	1990	
Rosalind				
Rosenerdling				
Roseval				
Roslau				
Royal Blue				
Rua		New Zealand		
Runa		Bolivia		
Ruby Lou				
Russet Burbank			1902	
Russet Norkotah				
Russian blue		Russia		
Sapphire				
Sebago				
Sechswochenkartoffel				
Selma		Germany	1972	
Sharpes Express				
Shepody				
Shetland Black		Scotland		
Sieglinde		Germany	1938	Was voted as German "potato of the year 2010".
Sigma				
Silverton Russet				
Sirco				
Skerry Champion		Scotland	1922	
Snowden				
Solara				
Spunta				
Stobrawa		Poland		
Superior		United States	1962	
Svenungas Blaue				
Sylvana				Parentage: Fabula x Xantia
Tannenberg				
Tennaer				
Tiger Russet				
Toya		Japan	1992	
Tūtaekurī		New Zealand		
Tyson				Cross: Sylvana x Cyrano
UACH 0918				
UACH 0964				
UACH 0965				
Ulster Emblem		Ireland	1966	
Umatilla Russet		United States	1998	
Urberger				
Victoria				
Villetta Rose		United States	1994	
Vineta				
Viola				
Violette d'Auvergne				
Violine de Borée				
Vitelotte		France		
Vivaldi		Netherlands		
Warba		United States	1927	
Weißauge				
Yellow Finn				
Yukon Gold		Canada	1965	

== See also ==
- List of potato dishes
