= Prince Edward Island Potatoes =

Potatoes grown in Prince Edward Island

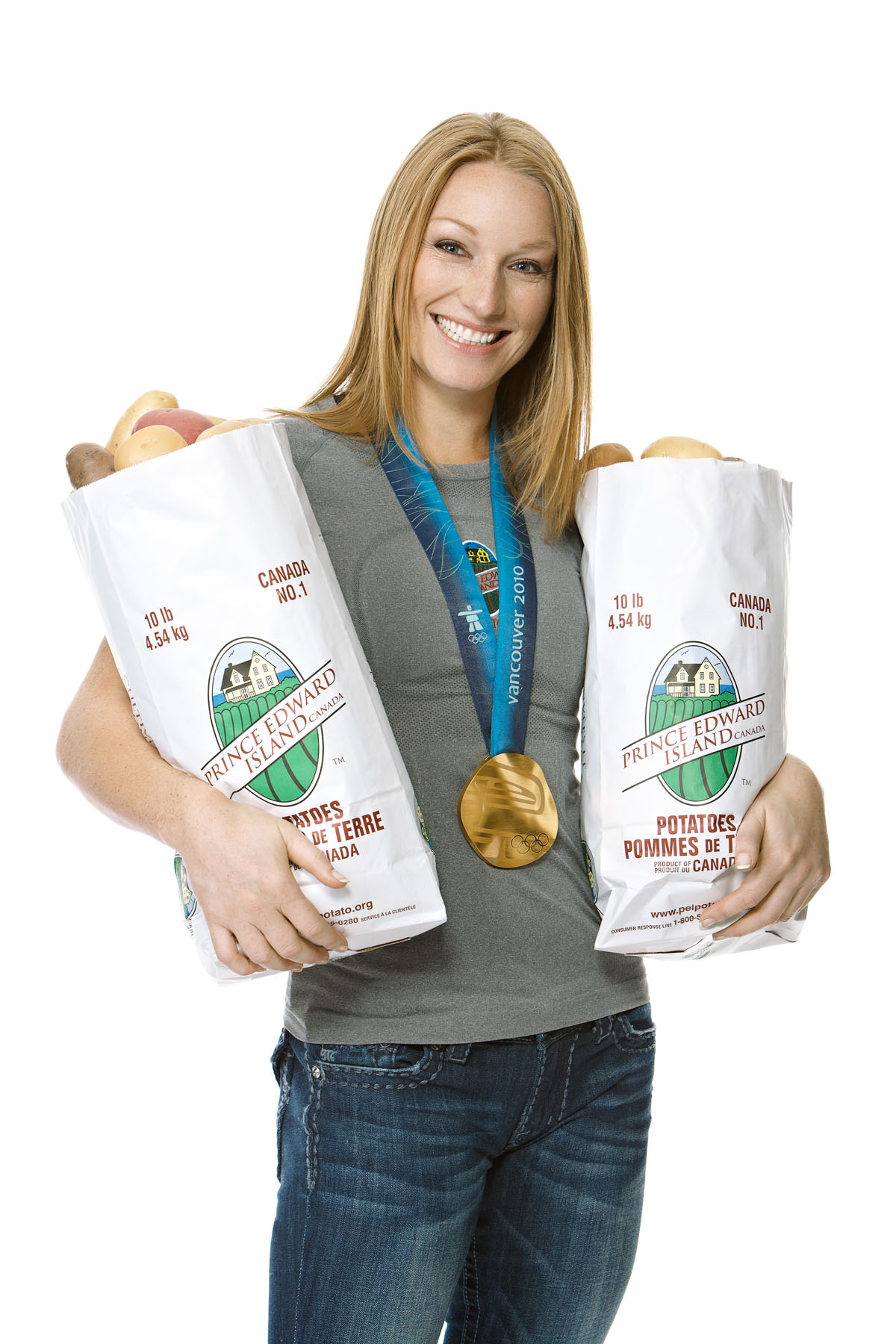
Heather Moyse, Brand Ambassador for Prince Edward Island Potatoes

Prince Edward Island Potatoes (also known as PEI Potatoes) refers to the brand and geographic identifier for potatoes grown and packaged in Prince Edward Island, a Maritime Province on the Atlantic coast of Canada.

In a similar fashion to potatoes grown in other parts of North America (such as Idaho), Prince Edward Island Potatoes are marketed and trademarked as being grown in the unique growing conditions and climate of Prince Edward Island. Prince Edward Island's growing conditions are characterized by warm summers, relatively cold winters, significant natural precipitation, and a unique red soil high in iron oxide. These conditions reduce the need for continuous irrigation and help to reduce the prevalence of production limiting diseases and pests while providing the right temperatures and soil conditions for profitable potato production.

== Industry structure ==
The marketing and distribution of potatoes grown in Prince Edward Island is regulated by the Prince Edward Island Potato Board, a producer-owned and operated association with a mandate to ensure the long-term profitability and sustainability of the industry. The Prince Edward Island Potato Board is registered as a producer-controlled board under the Natural Products Marketing Act of 1990 of the Province of Prince Edward Island. The Prince Edward Island Potato Board is responsible for assisting growers and dealers with finding markets for PEI Potatoes as well as helping to improve the industry as a whole through investment and education in food safety, environmental sustainability, research, farm policy, and farm practices.

== Economic impact ==
The potato industry is a major economic engine for the Province of Prince Edward Island. Prince Edward Island produces approximately 25% of the total potato crop grown in Canada each year. An economic impact study published in 2012 notes that the potato industry is worth over $1 Billion (CAN) to the PEI economy each year, contributing 10.8% of provincial GDP. The potato industry also directly or indirectly employs approximately 12% of the provincial workforce. Approximately 88,000 acres of potatoes were grown in Prince Edward Island in 2013.

== Markets for potatoes ==
Approximately 60% of potatoes grown in Prince Edward Island are processed into products such as French fries or potato chips. Major companies involved in contracting potatoes for processing in PEI include Cavendish Farms, McCain Foods, Frito-Lay, and Old Dutch potato chips.

Another 30% of Prince Edward Island Potatoes are destined for fresh markets (also known as tablestock). Fresh potatoes from PEI are marketed in all provinces of Canada, the Eastern Seaboard of the United States, as well as a number of export markets (notably countries and dependencies in the Caribbean. Prince Edward Island's proximity to large population centers in Eastern North America as well as its access to container shipment through Halifax, Nova Scotia and Saint John, New Brunswick assist in getting product to market in a cost-effective manner.

The final 10% of Prince Edward Island's potato harvest is grown for seed production, to produce the next year's potato crop. The majority of seed grown in PEI is utilized within the province, but seed potatoes have been exported to the United States and a number of other countries for many years. The Prince Edward Island Potato Board operates an Elite Seed Farm to multiple early generation seed for the benefit of Island potato growers.

== Potato production in Prince Edward Island ==
Potatoes are planted in Prince Edward Island starting in early May each year. "New potatoes" are harvested starting in June and continue to be harvested during the growing season, primarily for local production. The main harvest begins in late September and usually continues until early November. Fresh market potatoes are usually harvested first, with Russet varieties normally harvested later in the season. Among the most popular varieties grown in Prince Edward Island are Russet Burbank, Goldrush, Superior, Yukon Gold, Red Norland, and a number of proprietary varieties. Over 100 varieties of potatoes are grown in Prince Edward Island. Potatoes generally marketed as Russet, Round White, Yellow Fleshed, Red, or Specialty varieties.

In 2016, 36,017ha were seeded and 35,896ha harvested, with a yield of 32.50 tonnes per harvested hectare and receipts of $249 million.

== Cultural impacts ==
The Prince Edward Island community of O'Leary is home to the Canadian Potato Museum. In 1969, Stompin' Tom Connors released his song "Bud the Spud" about a truck driver who hauls potatoes from Prince Edward Island.
