= Stobrawa =

Stobrawa may refer to:

- Stobrawa (potato), a Polish potato variety
- Stobrawa Landscape Park, a protected area around the Stobrawa river in south-west Poland
- Stobrawa, Opole Voivodeship, a village in south-west Poland
