= Ozette potato =

Potato variety

Potato 'Ozette'
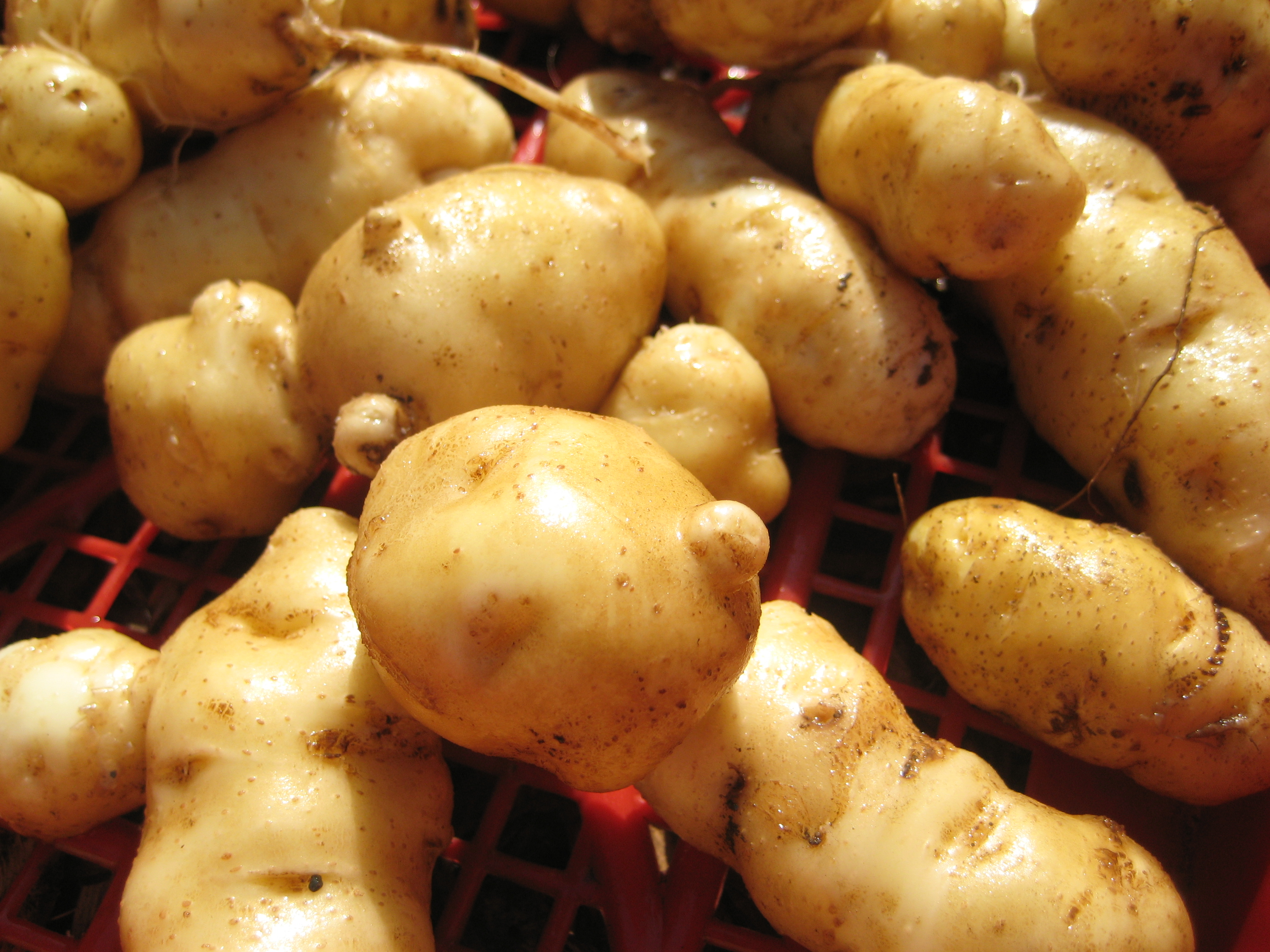
- 'Ozette' potato tubers
- Species: Solanum tuberosum
- Cultivar: 'Ozette'
- Origin: Washington, USA

The Ozette, also known locally as Makah Ozette or Anna Cheeka's Ozette is the oldest variety of potato grown in the Pacific Northwest region. This potato, of the petite heirloom fingerling type, was grown for over two centuries by the Makah tribe native to Washington and was "rediscovered" in the late 1980s.

The name Ozette is derived from the village of the same name, one of the five permanent pre-treaty villages of the Makah tribe.

== Description ==
The tubers of the Ozette grow to be between 3 and 7 inches in length with an irregular shape, elongated and slightly lumpy. Its form is covered in thin, tan colored skin speckled with brown freckling and deep set eyes. The flesh of the Ozette potato is creamy white and firm. When cooked, the Ozette develops a dense yet creamy texture and offers a rich, slightly sweet and earthy flavor with nuances of roasted chestnuts.

== History ==
Based on tribal accounts and historical evidence, the most likely origin of the potato into the Pacific Northwest was via an incursion of Spaniards in the region at the end of the 18th century. In 1792, a Spanish fort was built by Salvador Fidalgo in Nuñez Gaona, now Neah Bay, on the northwest coast of the Strait of Juan de Fuca. A garden was then planted which contained several New World crops including the potato and tomato, brought directly from South America by Spanish ships. It is believed that the Makah traded for or otherwise acquired the crop from the Spanish at this time, prior to the fort's abandonment the following spring.

In the 1860s, a schoolteacher who lived among Makah, James Swan, indicated that the potato was a staple of the tribe's diet alongside fish, seal, and whale oil.

The potato was not grown outside of Makah gardens until the 1980s, when it was marketed independently by a seed vendor in Idaho (Ronniger's Potato Farm) under the name of Ozette. In 1988, the potato of Macahs was introduced to the Potato Introduction Station Collection at Sturgeon Bay, Wisconsin as the Swedish Colony, its presumed origin having been attributed to a former Swedish establishment set on Ozette Lake. Since 1990, samples of this potato collected in collaboration with the Makah tribe have been preserved in tissue culture at the United States Department of Agriculture / Agricultural Research Service lab in Prosser.

In 2006, a partnership was formed to increase production and promote this potato variety. Partners include the Slow Food Association's Seattle chapter, the Makah Nation, local farmers, the Seattle Chefs Collaborative, and a USDA certified seed laboratory.

== Genetic Origin ==
The Ozette is a traditional variety whose precise genetic origin is unknown. However, a phylogenetic analysis conducted at Washington State University confirmed that it was imported directly from South America, while all other varieties grown in the United States are derived from imports from Europe.
