= Marcy potato =

White potato variety

Potato 'Marcy'
- Genus: Solanum
- Species: Solanum tuberosum
- Hybrid parentage: Atlantic variety x 'Q155-3' variety
- Cultivar: 'Marcy'
- Breeder: Cornell University, in 1990
- Origin: USA

Marcy is a late maturing white potato variety. It was originally bred in 1990 at Cornell University from a cross between the Atlantic variety and Q155-3 variety. It is mostly used for chipping, but can be used for baking and boiling. It has great storability and the chip color is good even after short to medium storage. Marcy has a high yielding crop.

== Botanical features ==
- Marcy plants are tall and semi-upright with no pigmentation in the stem and very prominent wings.
- The sprouts are red-violet with a spherical shape. The tip has a semi-open habit and is weakly pubescent with no pigment while the base is somewhat pubescent with moderate pigmentation.
- The leaves have an open silhouette and have a green color except on midribs and petioles, which are not pigmented.
- The primary leaflets are in four pairs, are large and elliptical with the base cordate and the tip acuminate. There are few secondary and tertiary leaflets. The terminal leaflets are medium-sized and have an ovate shape with the tip acuminate and the base cordate with no wavy margins.
- This plant produces no berries, but does produce many white flowers with yellow orange anthers from unpigmented buds.
- The tubers have a relatively large, slightly flattened oval shape with few predominantly apical and shallow eyes, with non-prominent eyebrows.
- The skin is highly netted and buff colored.
- Tubers have medium to high specific gravity.

== Agricultural features ==
- Marcy has good resistance to common scab and is moderately resistant to golden nematode.
- Marcy has few external defects, but is susceptible to internal heat necrosis and hollow heart (hollowed center of potato).
- Marcy is moderately susceptible to late blight and more susceptible to potato wart, PVY, and PVX.
