= Superior potato =

Variety of potato

Potato 'Superior'
- Genus: Solanum
- Species: S. tuberosum
- Hybrid parentage: B96-56 × M59.44
- Cultivar: 'Superior'
- Breeder: University of Wisconsin

Superior is a white-skinned, white-fleshed, mid-season potato variety. It was released by the University of Wisconsin potato breeding program in 1962, and is not under plant variety protection. It is a progeny of a cross between 'B96-56' and 'M59.44' and was first grown in 1951. 'B96-56' was also a parent of Kennebec. Like the potato variety Atlantic, Superior is widely grown for potato chip manufacturing right off the field and marketable yields are fairly high.

== Botanical features ==
- Self-fertile
- Tubers (potatoes) are oval to round with medium-depth eyes.
- Tuber skin is white and may become lightly russeted as it matures.
- Flesh is white and has a high specific gravity.
- The plants are medium height
- Reddish purple stems
- Terminal leaflets are short and ovate
- Primary leaflets are thick and arched
- Flowers have white tips
- Sprouts are dark purple

== Agricultural features ==
- High yields, it is used for potato chips, but grows best in cool climates.
- It has moderate resistance to common scab and Verticillium wilt
- It is generally free from defects such as growth cracks, greening, secondary growth, heat necrosis, hollow heart, and vascular discoloration in tubers, but is susceptible to potato virus Y, potato virus X, and late blight.
