= Villetta Rose potato =

Red potato variety

Potato 'Villetta Rose'
- Genus: Solanum
- Species: Solanum tuberosum
- Hybrid parentage: 'Dark Red Norland' x 'Nordonna'
- Cultivar: 'Villetta Rose'
- Breeder: Rhinelander Agricultural Research Station
- Origin: Madison, Wisconsin, USA in 1994

The Villetta Rose is a late maturing red potato variety. It was developed at the University of Wisconsin-Madison and is under plant variety protection. It originated from a cross between Dark Red Norland and Nordonna varieties. 'Villetta Rose' has a medium to long dormancy, stores well and maintains its red color in storage. It is grown for fresh sale and processing including canning.

== Botanical Features ==
- The 'Villetta Rose' plant has medium vigorous vines with a semi-upright growth habit.
- It has dark green leaves and red-purple flowers.
- Tubers are a medium size and have a uniform spherical shape with shallow eyes.

== Agricultural Features ==
- 'Villetta Rose' is resistant to bruising.
- It is moderately resistant to PVY, early blight, pink rot and soft rot.
- It is susceptible to common scab and medium-small tubers may develop skin netting.
