= Vivaldi potato =

Potato cultivar

Potato 'Vivaldi'
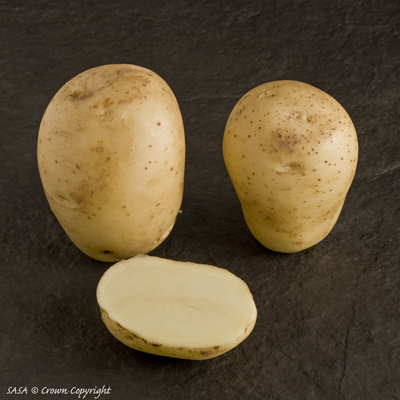
- Genus: Solanum
- Species: Solanum tuberosum
- Hybrid parentage: 'TZ 77 148' × 'Monalisa'
- Cultivar: 'Vivaldi'
- Origin: HZPC in the Netherlands

The Vivaldi potato is a cultivar of potato bred by HZPC, in the Netherlands, and then passed to 'Naturally Best', based in Lincolnshire, England, who promoted and distributed the potato in the UK.

The name was chosen as a reference to Antonio Vivaldi, since, as the potatoes are grown both in the UK and overseas, they are available during all "Four Seasons" of the year. The known parents of 'Vivaldi' are 'TZ 77 148' and 'Monalisa', which are not commonly grown in the UK.

'Vivaldi' is a Second Early variety producing oval tubers with yellow skin and pale yellow flesh and which are resistant to scab.

Botanical features of this variety include a tall plant with stems weakly pigmented and slightly swollen nodes. Terminal and primary leaflets are ovate, the flowers have orange anthers and a white corolla with a prominent star. The tubers have few shallow eyes with light yellow flesh and the sprouts are a red-violet.

The Vivaldi potato is field immune to potato wart, and highly resistant to potato viruses A and Y. It is moderately resistant to leaf roll, potato virus X, late blight on tuber, silver scurf, blackleg and black dot, and is moderately susceptible to late blight on leaves, common scab, powdery scab, rhizoctonia and skin spot. A general assessment is that Vivaldi's disease resistance is "on the low side". The variety has the advantage of producing a good crop of potatoes, with a longer than average harvest time.

It was the winner in the Fresh Produce category at the Q Food and Drink awards in 2006 and won gold at The Grocer Own Label Awards in 2011, where the judges said that there was no need to add butter to improve the taste. It was awarded the RHS Award of Garden Merit.

HZPC, who originally bred Vivaldi, cite its advantages as "very good taste, good yield, good cooking quality, suitable for different market segments, and uniform tuber size and shape".

The UK producers reported that laboratory studies "suggested" 'Vivaldi' to be lower in calories and carbohydrates than many other popular potato varieties. However, a later assessment found that Vivaldi potatoes were similar to other varieties in nutritional value, and no better for slimming, by simply comparing stated nutritional values for different varieties. The assessors found that Vivaldi had a slightly smoother texture than many other varieties, but not a buttery taste.
