= Mizen =

Mizen (not to be confused with mizzen) may refer to:

- Mizen Head, one of the extreme points of the island of Ireland
- Mizen potato, a potato variety
- Jimmy Mizen, a 16-year-old boy killed in May 2008 in London.
