= Laura potato =

Variety of potato

Laura
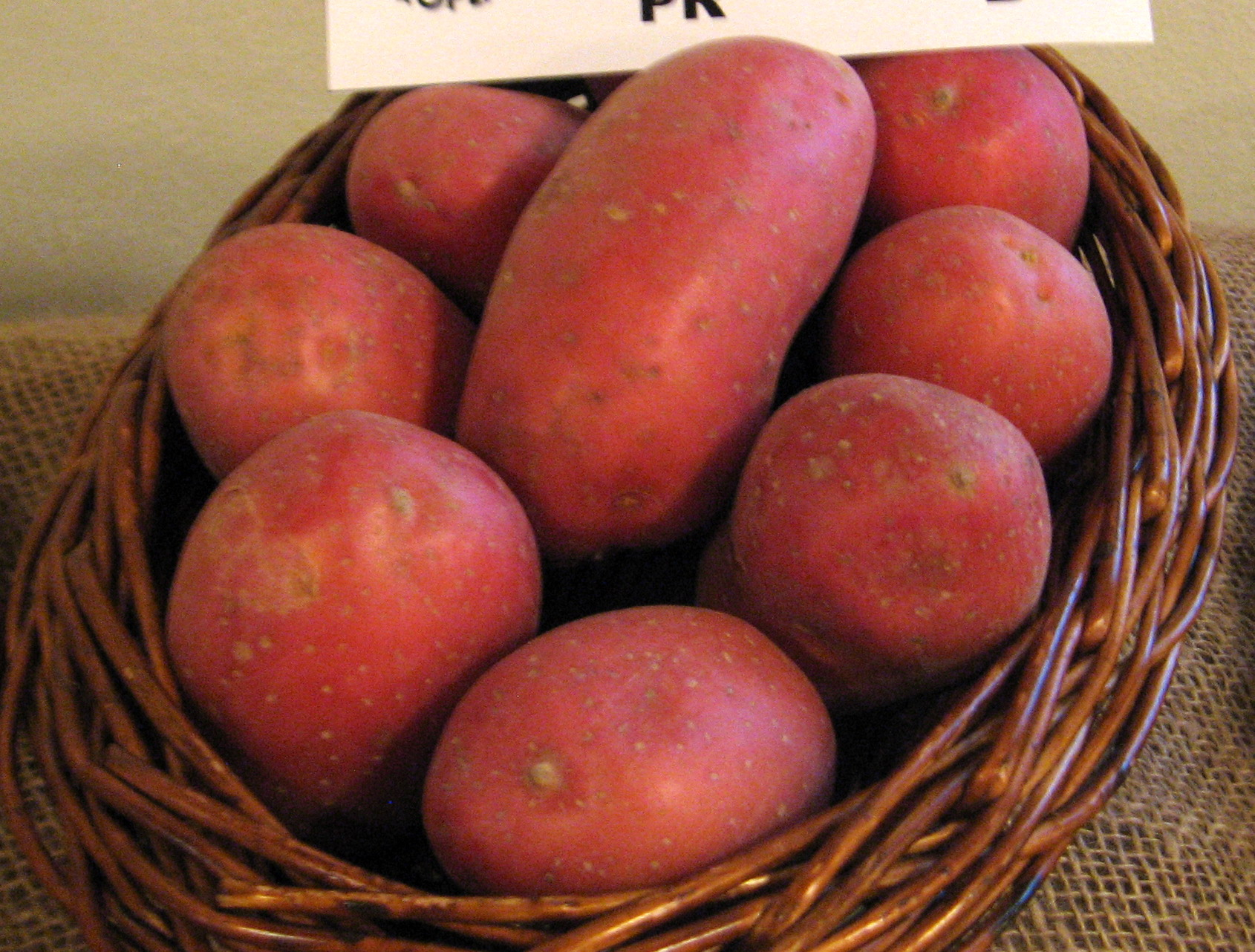
- Genus: Solanum
- Species: Solanum tuberosum
- Cultivar: 'Laura'

Laura is a mid-season-ripening, firm-fleshed, edible potato. The Laura potato is red-skinned with a rich potato-yellow flesh color and an oval shape. It was first recognised in 1998 in Austria. The depth of the eyes is between flat and very flat.

The potato is robustly resistant to damage and is highly resistant to scab, leafroll virus and potato viruses A and Y. However, it is susceptible to potato wart and cyst nematodes.

Some authorities advise against the use of any herbicide containing metribuzine at any stage.
