= Irish White potato =

Variety of potato

Irish White
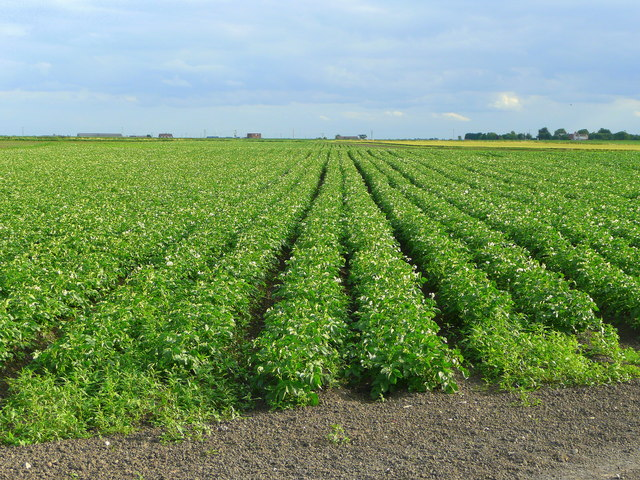
- Genus: Solanum
- Species: Solanum tuberosum
- Cultivar: 'Irish White'
- Origin: Ireland, 1882

Irish White is a variety of potato that was traditionally grown in counties Donegal and Antrim. It was raised by Robert Christie of Ballytaggart about 1882.

The tubers are long, irregular and white skinned with very deep eyes, similar to an 'Irish Lumper' in appearance.
