= Adirondack Red =

Variety of potato

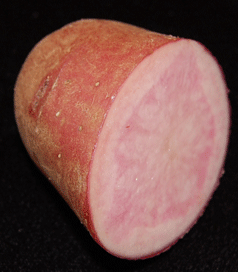
- Adirondack Red potato tuber
- Species: Solanum tuberosum
- Cultivar: 'Adirondack Red'
- Origin: United States, 2003

Adirondack Red is a potato variety with red flesh and skin, bred by Cornell University potato breeders Robert Plaisted, Ken Paddock and Walter De Jong, and released in 2004.

The Adirondack varieties are unusual because both the skin and the flesh are colored and have high levels of anti-oxidants. They are described as "Early- to mid-season, medium- to high-yielding variety. Dark green decumbent to spreading vines bear oblong to long, slightly flattened, purplish-red-skinned tubers with shallow eyes and pink to red flesh."

Adirondack Red was found to be susceptible to silver scurf disease, as well as the golden cyst nematode. It was also found to have moderate resistance to common scab.

== See also ==
- Adirondack Blue potato
