= Champion potato =

Variety of potato

Potato 'Champion'
- Genus: Solanum
- Species: Solanum tuberosum
- Cultivar: 'Champion'
- Breeder: John Nichol Ochterloney.
- Origin: Scotland, 1863

Champion is a potato variety bred by John Nicoll in Scotland and widely grown in Ireland during the latter half of the 19th century. The tuber is round, with white skin and yellow flesh. The texture is described as "floury".

== History ==
During the late 19th century, the Champion dominated the Irish potato industry, largely due to its resistance to the blight strain prominent during the 1879 epidemic. The variety grew from a planting of 220,934 acres (27 percent of the total Irish potato crop) in 1880 to a planting of 717,000 acres (80 percent of the crop) in 1894. After 1894, other varieties, including Kerr's Pink and Arran Banner, came to prominence, and the Champion declined in importance.
