= Yukon Gold potato =

Cultivar of potato

'Yukon Gold'
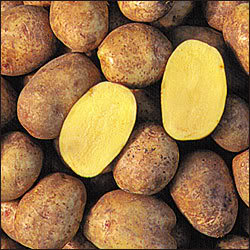
- The golden yellow flesh of the 'Yukon Gold' potato
- Genus: Solanum
- Species: Solanum tuberosum
- Hybrid parentage: 'Norgleam' × W5279-4
- Cultivar: 'Yukon Gold'
- Origin: Ontario, Canada

'Yukon Gold' is a large cultivar of potato most distinctly characterized by its thin, smooth, brown, eye-free skin and yellow-tinged flesh. This potato was developed in the 1960s by Garnet ("Gary") Johnston in Guelph, Ontario, Canada, with the help of Geoff Rowberry at the University of Guelph. The official cross bred strain was made in 1966 and 'Yukon Gold' was released into the market in 1980.

== Development and naming ==
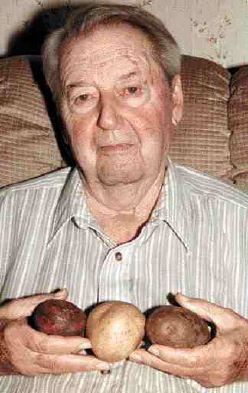
Gary Johnston, the principal creator of the 'Yukon Gold' potato

In the 1900s, many Dutch and Belgian immigrants began settling in the "Banana Belt" region of southern Ontario. Many of these immigrants began vegetable farming around the towns of Simcoe, Leamington, and Harrow along the shore of Lake Erie. In the 1950s, the vegetable growers of this region began petitioning for the breeding rights and licensing for a yellow-fleshed potato like ones they were used to growing in Europe. For Gary Johnston, this began the nearly 30-year development of the 'Yukon Gold' potato.

In 1953, Johnston was a lab technician in the potato development laboratory at the Ontario Agriculture College and he led a team that cross-bred two varieties to create the new type. In 1959, one of Johnston’s graduate students, a young man originally from Peru, told him of a small, rough, deep-yellow-fleshed potato (Solanum stenotomum goniocalyx, known as papa amarilla, Spanish for "yellow potato") that was grown by the many indigenous communities in the Peruvian Andes. In Lima, this cultivar is considered a delicacy for its bright colour and distinct flavour. After trying these Peruvian potatoes, Johnston set out to breed a potato with the same colour and flavor characteristics, but larger in size and with a smoother shape, similar to the potatoes being grown in that part of Southwestern Ontario. In 1966, the development team made their first cross between a W5289-4 (2× cross between 'Yema de huevo' and 2× Katahdin) and a 'Norgleam' potato native to North Dakota. After the 66th cross that year, a true-breeding seed was produced, and the G6666 was created.

The early name for the new cultivar was "Yukon", for the Yukon River involved in the Klondike Gold Rush in Northern Canada. Charlie Bishop, or Walter Shy according to some sources, suggested adding "Gold" to describe the colour and appearance. "It was a revolutionary concept ... He was a pioneer. He [Johnston] had the vision for yellow-fleshed potatoes", said Hielke De Jong, a potato breeder with Agriculture and Agri-Food Canada. Johnston also developed and brought 15 other potato varieties to market while at the Ontario Agriculture College lab, where he had been seconded by his employer, Agriculture Canada.

A University publication states that "Yukon Gold was the first Canadian-bred potato variety to be promoted, packaged and marketed with its name right on the pack".

In spite of the overwhelming success of this potato for some years, sales in Canada dropped 30% between 2004 and 2014 as other varieties became increasingly popular.

Yukon Gold potatoes are susceptible to seed decay, blackleg, early blight, late blight, early dying, PVY, soft rot, dry rot, leak, pink rot, silver scurf, and black scurf.

Leaf

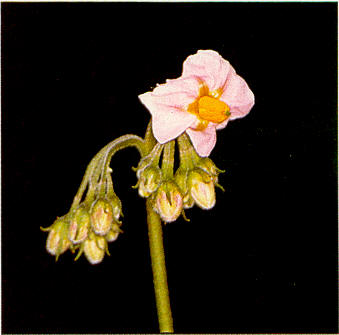
Flower

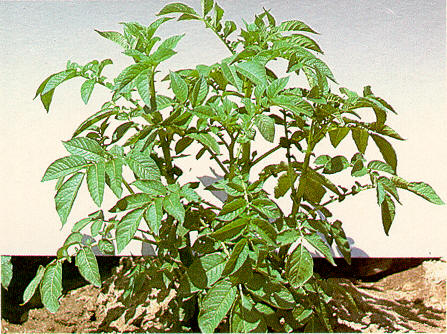
Plant

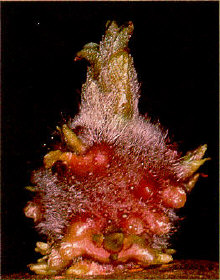
Sprout

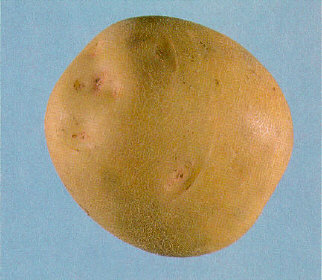
Skin

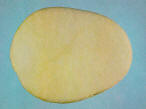
Flesh

== Storage ==
This cultivar is resistant to bruising. Sprouts are minimal as it has good dormancy. If tubers are stored correctly they do not lose significant moisture, when compared with other cultivars. It is important that the lenticels are not swollen and that the skin is not bruised as this can lead to major rot issues.

== See also ==
- Creamer potato
- List of Canadian inventions and discoveries
