= Red Gold potato =

Variety of potato

Potato 'Red Gold'
- Genus: Solanum
- Species: Solanum tuberosum
- Cultivar: 'Red Gold'
- Origin: Canada, 1970s

Red Gold or Golden Red Skins, potato is an early variety of North American potato. It has a red skin with yellow flesh inside. It is resistant to potato leafroll virus and potato virus Y and moderately resistant to common scab, but is susceptible to potato virus A and potato virus S.

Red Gold was bred in Canada in the 1970s and registered in 1987.

Red Gold has a mid season maturity, is medium sized with ovate primary and terminal leaflets. The flowers of this variety have golden yellow anthers and medium berry production. The Red Gold tubers are round to oval with medium eye depth and the sprouts are very pubescent with a pinkish-yellow apex.

== Medicinal uses ==
Red Gold potatoes are sometimes used as a home remedy to help with hemorrhoid relief. Hemorrhoid sufferers are instructed to cut the potato into a wedge and place it near the affected area.
