= Lenape potato =

Potato cultivar

Potato 'Lenape'
- Genus: Solanum
- Species: Solanum tuberosum
- Cultivar: 'Lenape'
- Breeder: Wilford Mills of Pennsylvania State University
- Origin: USA

Lenape (B5141-6) is a potato cultivar first released in 1967 and named after the Lenape Native American tribe, which had to be pulled from the market in 1970 after findings of its high glycoalkaloid content. It was bred by Wilford Mills of Pennsylvania State University in collaboration with the Wise Potato Chip Company. The Lenape potato was produced by crossing Delta Gold with a wild Peruvian potato (Solanum chacoense) known for its resistance to insects. It was selected for its high specific gravity (percentage dry matter) and low sugar content which made it ideal for producing potato chips but it was also immune to potato virus A and resistant to common strains of late blight. It is of medium-late maturity and produces round, white tubers with shallow eyes.

== Glycoalkaloid content ==
After the Lenape variety was released for commercial production, a potato breeder in Ontario ate some to see if they might be suitable as new potatoes but soon felt nauseated. When the same occurred next time he ate them, he sent a sample to be analysed by a vegetable biochemist, Dr. Ambrose Zitnak of the University of Guelph, who found they contained exceptionally high levels of glycoalkaloids (mainly solanine and chaconine), the natural toxins found in potatoes that help protect them from pests and disease. Lenape potatoes collected from around Canada were found to contain over 16–35 mg of glycoalkaloids per 100 g of fresh potato compared to 3–18 mg in other varieties. Samples grown at 39 locations around the US had an average of 29 mg per 100 g of potato but ranged from 16–65 mg compared to an average of 8 mg for five other varieties. Previously, high levels of glycoalkaloids in potatoes were associated with damage during harvest or potatoes that turned green due to exposure to light, rather than being genetically determined. The variety was removed from the market in 1970 and scientists recommended that future new potato varieties be tested for their glycoalkaloid content before widespread distribution.

=== Unintended risks ===
The variety has been cited as an example of how conventional plant breeding can produce varieties with high levels of toxins and this has been compared with the relatively lower risk of potential unintended health effects from genetically engineered crops (GM crops). In 1992 the Los Angeles Times reported that critics of GM crops cited it as an example of the problems they expected GM crops to create, despite the Lenape being a conventionally bred variety and not GM, while advocates noted that lessons learned from Lenape meant that regulations were in place to prevent a recurrence. In the case of the Lenape potato, the exceptionally high glycoalkaloid levels were likely due to the unintended introduction (through cross breeding) of new glycoalkaloid genes from the wild Peruvian parent. Genetic engineering avoids the risk of unintended introduction of new genes, as only selected genes that have been characterized in detail are introduced.

== Use in breeding ==
Lenape was kept for use in breeding and breeders selected for progeny containing high dry matter but rejected those with high glycoalkaloids. Lenape is a parent of chipping varieties including Atlantic, Trent, Belchip and Snowden and a grandparent of several others. A study published in 1998 found that Lenape had the highest dry matter content of chipping varieties released in the USA and concluded that the release of Lenape marked a "major advance in chipping quality" and was particularly responsible for a trend of increased dry matter content in newer varieties.
