= Pike potato =

Variety of potato

Potato 'Pike'
- Genus: Solanum
- Species: Solanum tuberosum
- Hybrid parentage: 'Allegany' x 'Atlantic potato'
- Cultivar: 'Pike'
- Origin: USA, 1996

Pike is a variety of potato bred by the Cornell and Pennsylvania Experimental Stations in March 1996. This clone originated from a cross made in 1981, between 'Allegany' and 'Atlantic potato' varieties. It is resistant to infection by golden nematode, common scab, golden necrosis, and foliage infection by Phytophthora. Pike is intended to be used agriculturally, specifically for use in potato chips.

== Botanical features ==
- Specific gravity comparable to 'Atlantic'
- Produce light-colored chips after 7 °C (45 °F) storage
- Full season variety
- Tubers are skin color with flaky surface
- Tuber shape is round
- Plants are medium height
- Leaves are medium green
- Three pairs per leaf for leaflets
- Anthers are orange, broad cone
