= Adirondack Blue =

Variety of potato

'Adirondack Blue'
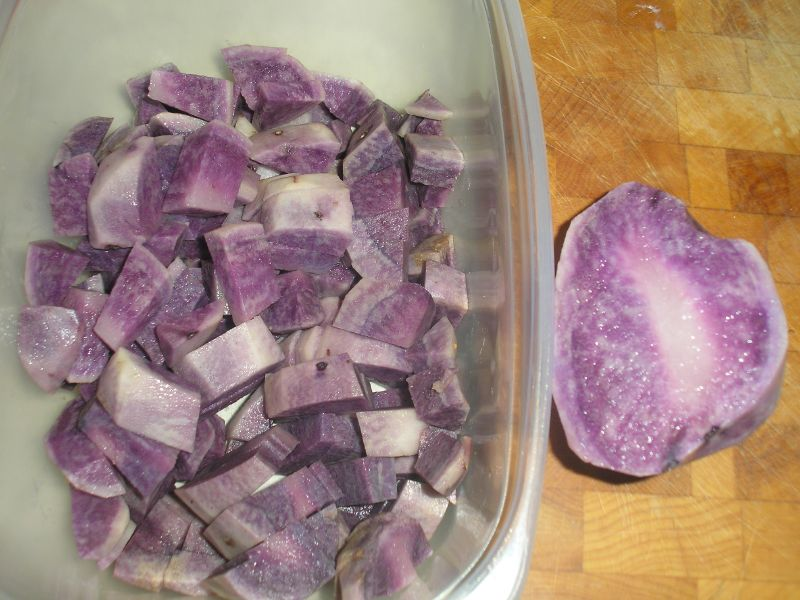
- Genus: Solanum
- Species: Solanum tuberosum
- Cultivar: 'Atom'
- Origin: Peru, 2003

The 'Adirondack Blue' is a potato variety with blue flesh and skin with a slight purple tint, released by Cornell University potato breeders Robert Plaisted, Ken Paddock, and Walter De Jong in 2003.

The 'Adirondack' varieties are purple and the skin may be slightly netted. Tuber dormancy is short. The tubers can be used for chips, but cannot be chipped from cold storage. Unlike most potato varieties developed at Cornell over the past few decades, it is susceptible to pink rot, leafhoppers, common potato viruses, Colorado potato beetle, Fusarium, and seed piece decay.

Penn State's alumni association is marketing potato chips in the school colors, using the 'Adirondack Blue'.

== See also ==
- 'Adirondack Red' potato
