= Red Pontiac =

Red potato variety

Potato 'Red Pontiac'
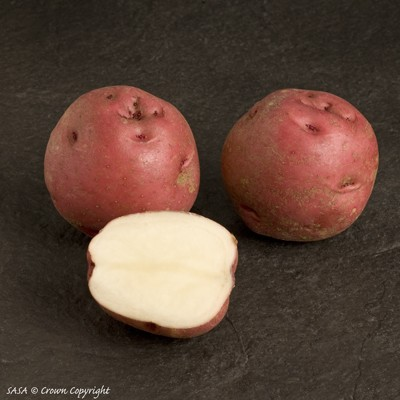
- Genus: Solanum
- Species: Solanum tuberosum
- Hybrid parentage: 'Pontiac' × unknown
- Cultivar: 'Red Pontiac'
- Origin: Florida, USA

The Red Pontiac (also known as Dakota Chief) is a red-skinned early main crop potato variety originally bred in the United States, and is sold in the United States, Canada, Australia, Marruecos, the Philippines, Venezuela and Uruguay. It arose as a color mutant of the original Pontiac variety in Florida by a J.W. Weston in 1945. It was registered by the USDA in 1983. The original Pontiac itself was a hybrid of varieties "Triumph" and "Katahdin" and released in the US in 1938 and Australia in 1940.

The plants are large and spreading with angled stems and large light purple flowers. The potatoes are deep-eyed and round with dark red skin and white waxy flesh, though can be knobbly if soil moisture is uneven. The skin colour can fade significantly, leaving only the eyes as red.

== Cooking ==
It can be used in recipes for baking, boiling, mashing, roasting or in salads, and can be cooked in a microwave oven. It is not so suitable for frying. Red potatoes may be cooked with the skin on, and should be scrubbed and rinsed before preparation.
