= Marfona =

Potato cultivar

Potato 'Marfona'
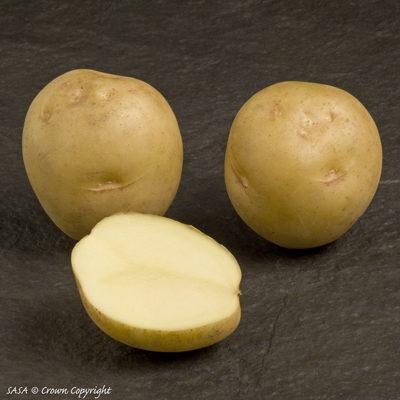
- Genus: Solanum
- Species: Solanum tuberosum
- Cultivar: 'Marfona'
- Origin: Netherlands, 1975

A Marfona is a potato cultivar with a moderately waxy texture. It originated in the Netherlands in 1975. It has a light brown or yellow skin and a yellow to cream flesh, and is a high yielding Second Early variety.

Due to the potato having a strong flavour it is very good for use as baking, boiling and mashing.
