= Red La Soda =

Potato cultivar

Potato 'Red La Soda'
- Genus: Solanum
- Species: Solanum tuberosum
- Hybrid parentage: 'La Soda' x unknown
- Cultivar: 'Red La Soda'
- Origin: Louisiana, USA

Red La Soda is a red, main season potato cultivar. It is a deep red mutant of the potato variety 'La Soda'. The non-mutant form was developed by the Louisiana potato breeding program in 1948 as a cross between 'Triumph' and 'Katahdin'. The mutant form was first observed in 1949 but was not released until 1953 by the United States Department of Agriculture, (USDA) and the Louisiana Agricultural Experiment Station.

== Botanical Features ==
- Plant is spreading and medium in size.
- Stems, leaves and petioles are all green and are lightly pubescent.
- Their large lavender flowers are limited in pollen.
- Tubers range from a round to oblong slightly flattened shape.
- Tuber skin is red and smooth but may fade in color over time. Skinning also may occur.
- Tuber flesh is white.
- Tubers have a low specific gravity

== Agricultural Features ==
- Red La Soda is susceptible to early and late blights, scab, corky ring spot and bacterial wilt.
- It is mostly grown for the fresh market, very good for boiling.
- It is primarily grown in the southeastern part of the United States and mainly harvested in the winter months.
