= Red Norland =

Red potato variety

Potato 'Red Norland'
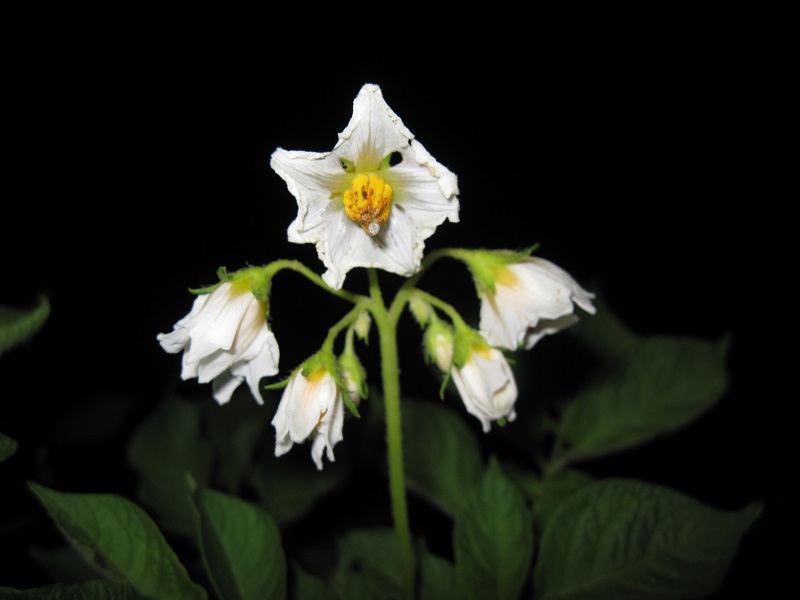
- Genus: Solanum
- Species: Solanum tuberosum
- Hybrid parentage: 'Norland' x unknown
- Cultivar: 'Red Norland'
- Origin: North Dakota, USA after 1957

Red Norland is a red, early-maturing potato. Smaller tubers (B and C size) are commonly sold as “baby reds” and this variety is often served boiled or in potato salads. The progenitor variety, 'Norland', was released by the North Dakota Agricultural College in 1957. Since the release of 'Norland', other darker red skinned variants were selected, most notably 'Red Norland' and 'Dark Red Norland'. None of these three varieties is under plant variety protection. The darker red strains are now widely grown, and 'Norland' is rarely grown. 'Norland' and its selections are widely adapted, but have relatively low to intermediate yields.

== Botanical Feature ==
- Medium large with medium thick prominently angled stems and determinate growth
- Dark red skin and white flesh
- Slightly closed, medium to large medium green leaves and green petioles
- Green, slightly swollen nodes have green inter-nodes and waved wings
- Ovate leaflets are acutely lobed and asymmetrical
- Purple flowers with medium to large sized yellow anthers
- Flowers have abundant pollen
- Tubers have an oblong, slightly flattened shape with a smooth texture and shallow eyes
- Tubers have low specific gravity and are good for boiling and salads, but not for processing into chips or fries or for baking

== Agricultural Feature ==
- Variety with Early Maturity and Moderate Resistance to Common Scab
- Tolerant to common scab
- Susceptible to Potato virus Y (PVY) – shows severe rugose symptoms
- Due to field resistance, PVY levels tend to stay low in Red Norland crops
- Susceptible to other common potato viruses – Potato virus X, Potato virus S, Potato leaf roll virus
- Susceptible to early blight, late blight, silver scurf, powdery scab, and air pollution injury
