= Melody potato =

Variety of potato

Solanum tuberosum 'Melody'
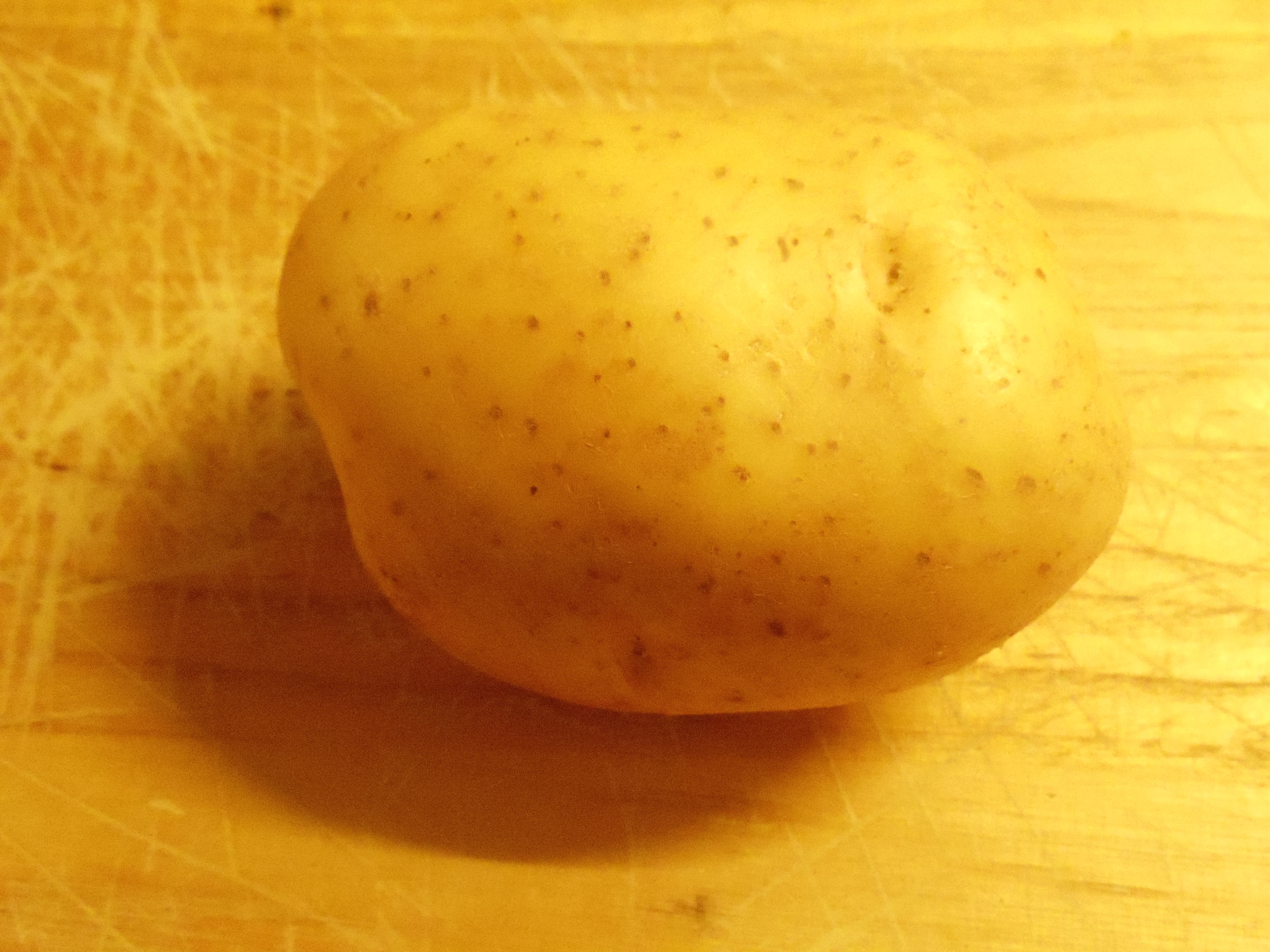
- A Melody tuber
- Genus: Solanum
- Species: Solanum tuberosum
- Cultivar: 'Melody'

Melody is a cultivar of potato.

== Description ==
It is yellow, with a smooth skin, and dry flesh. It can be boiled and mashed. Melody has a high yield potential and has an overall good disease resistance. It is resistant to late blight on tubers, common scab, bruising, Fusarium sulphureum (dry rot) and Globodera rostochiensis (a potato cyst nematode).

== History ==
The breeder, Meijer Research B.V., a Dutch company, holds the rights until 2030.

== Characteristics ==
The 'Melody' potato features oval-shaped tubers with yellow skin and medium-yellow flesh. Its eyes have a relatively shallow depth, and the skin is smooth.

When sprouted, the base of the sprout is violet in colour; the plant itself reaches a medium height with red-violet flowers that produce few berries.
