= Belle de Fontenay =

Potato variety

Potato 'Belle de Fontenay'
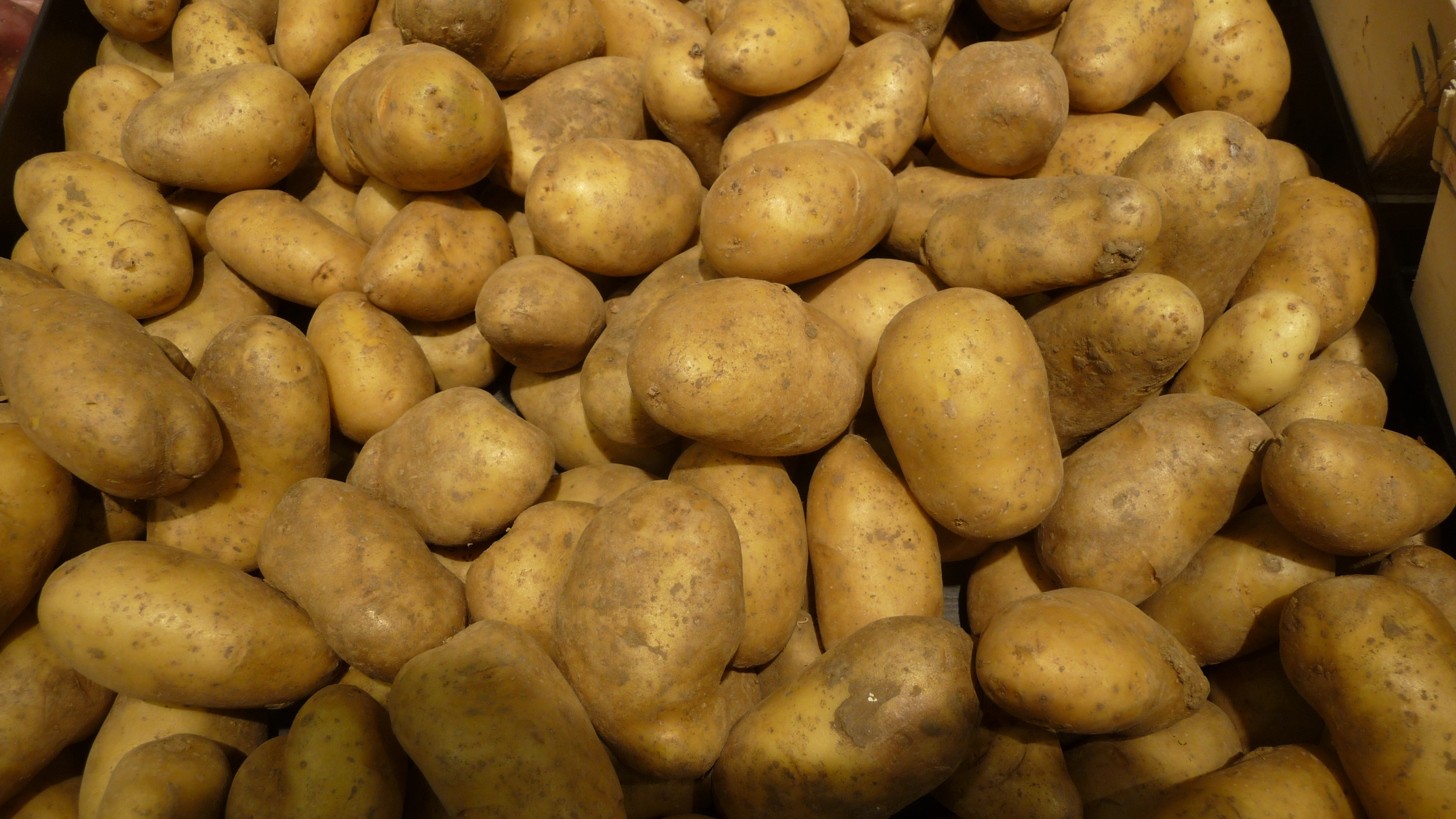
- Genus: solanum
- Species: Solanum tuberosum
- Cultivar: 'Belle de Fontenay'
- Origin: France

Belle de Fontenay is a small fingerling potato variety with yellow skin and yellow flesh. This heirloom variety was released in France in 1885.

This variety has a firm, waxy texture and is suitable for salads and soup. This variety has a long shaped tuber with a shallow eye depth and smooth skin. The colour of the base of the light sprout is blue, the maturity is early maincrop, the flowers are a blue violet colour and there are no berries on the plant of this species.
