= Yellow Finn potato =

Potato variety

Potato 'Yellow Finn'
- Genus: Solanum
- Species: Solanum tuberosum
- Cultivar: 'Yellow Finn'
- Origin: Europe

Yellow Finn is a potato cultivar. Its origin is sourced to Europe. It is medium-sized with yellow flesh and skin that varies from white to yellow.

Although its yields are described as low, the cultivar was widely grown in California by small-scale producers during the 1990s.

A variety of the 'Yellow Finn' potato was grown on Lubbe Farms in Montesano, Washington, as of 2016.

This variety was originally grown in the US by Carl Gustav Riipinen on his farm in Montesano along the south bank of the Chehalis River. He brought them from Finland in the 1950s.

When growing this variety of potatoes, farmers tend to harvest them when they are not grown to their full potential because the market tends to prefer smaller tubers of this variety.

'Yellow Finn' has a dark yellow flesh, it also tends to have more of a flattened shape and deep eyes. The plant grows to about 2–3 feet (0.61–0.91 m) and needs a moderate amount of water. In terms of disease resistance it is known to be resistant to scab.
