= Skerry Champion =

Potato variety

Potato 'Skerry Champion'
- Genus: Solanum
- Species: Solanum tuberosum
- Cultivar: 'Skerry Champion'
- Origin: 1922

Skerry Champion is a variety of potato with a round-to-oval shape and creamy yellow skin with a blue and purple colouring. Skerry Champions have only recently become available to growers again after a long period of absence due to a host of viral diseases it was carrying. They have a floury texture. They are resistant to blight. To keep Skerry Champions healthy, the tops of diseased stems can be removed. It has also been known as Buchan Beauty and although introduced into Ireland in 1922, may have existed in the UK before then.
