= British Queen potato =

Variety of potato

British Queen
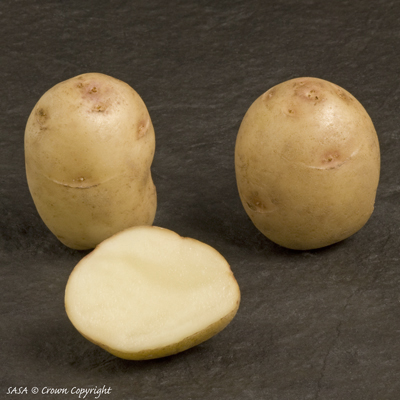
- Genus: Solanum
- Species: Solanum tuberosum
- Cultivar: 'British Queen'
- Breeder: Archibald Finlay
- Origin: Scotland, 1894

British Queen is a variety of potato that was bred by Archibald Finlay.

A type of potato with a great flavour and a floury flesh, Finlay wrote that it "is one of the finest white kidney-shaped mid-season potatoes."

This variety is highly susceptible to blight, however it often avoids blight because it flowers so early. The plant of this variety flowers freely and the blooms are white and have yellow centres. The dry matter content of this variety is high and the texture is light and floury. This variety is said to be one of the best for mashing.
