= Ulster Emblem potato =

Variety of potato from Northern Ireland

Potato 'Ulster Emblem'
- Genus: Solanum
- Species: Solanum tuberosum
- Cultivar: 'Ulster Emblem'
- Breeder: Mr J. Clarke
- Origin: Ireland, 1966

The Ulster Emblem variety of potato originated in Northern Ireland. It was originally bred by Mr J. Clarke of Ballymoney, County Antrim. It has a long oval shape with white skin and flesh which has a semiwaxy texture, reasonable flavour with good cooking quality, and a fairly good yield. This variety has a red violet coloured flower and a pink sprout colour. It also has a high resistance to late blight on the tubers as well as the plant foliage.
