= Shetland Black potato =

Variety of potato

Potato 'Shetland Black'
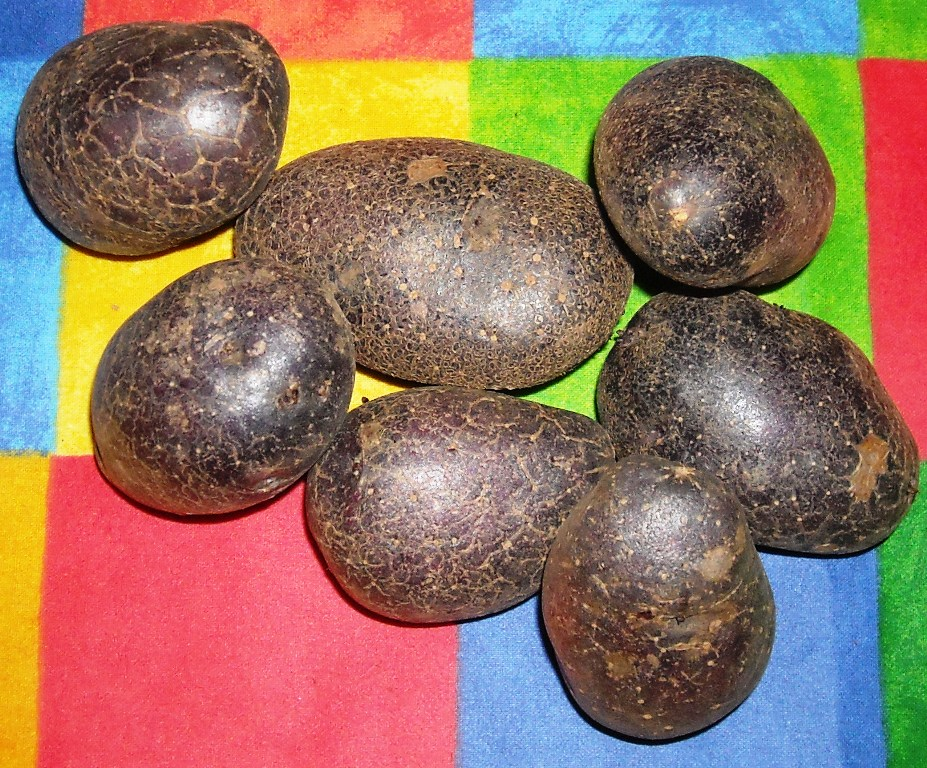
- Seven uncooked unpeeled 'Shetland Black' potatoes on a checked cloth background
- Genus: Solanum
- Species: Solanum tuberosum
- Cultivar: 'Shetland Black'
- Origin: Shetland Islands

Shetland Black is a dark purple heritage variety of potato. It comes from the Shetland Islands, and was developed in the Victorian era, though the exact origin remains unclear. It is part of the United Kingdom Ark of Taste. The plant grows to about 2.5 feet (0.76 m) tall and is shallow-rooted, making it suitable for container growing. The potato is suitable for roasting, baking or steaming, and is commonly fried into chips or crisps. The potato is fairly small compared with modern cultivars, and when sliced has a purple ring near the edge. When cooked, it develops a fluffy, floury texture.

The skin is uneven and thick, and dark in color. Its colour derives from the presence of two pigments, peonidin and petunidin, which make up 52% and 38% of the total pigments, respectively.

According to local folklore, the 'Shetland Black' came to the British Isles by way of a stranded Spanish Armada ship, but because it matures early in the season that provenance is disproven.
