= Rooster potato =

Type of food

Potato 'Rooster'
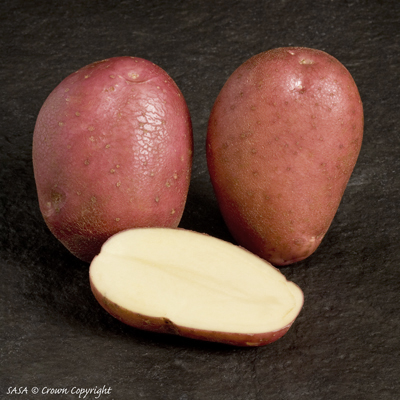
- Genus: Solanum
- Species: Solanum tuberosum
- Cultivar: 'Rooster'
- Breeder: Harry Kehoe, Teagasc Oak Park Research Centre
- Origin: Carlow, Ireland

Rooster is a red-skinned, yellow-fleshed cultivar of potato, duller in colour than the 'Désirée', with floury yellow flesh. It is uniformly roundish in shape with shallow eyes making it easy to peel. It is a general-purpose potato. It can be boiled, mashed, chipped, roasted, steamed and baked. It was originally bred in 1990 at the Teagasc Oak Park Research Centre in Carlow, Ireland, by Harry Kehoe. In 2004, 'Rooster' potatoes accounted for 38% of the total potato production in Ireland.
