= Megachip =

White potato variety

Potato 'MegaChip'
- Genus: Solanum
- Species: Solanum tuberosum
- Hybrid parentage: 'Wischip' v 'FYF85'
- Cultivar: 'MegaChip'

MegaChip is a round white potato variety with specific gravity for making potato chips.

It was developed at Rhinelander Agricultural Research Station in Wisconsin and it was result of a cross between 'Wischip' and 'FYF85'. The cross resulting in Megachip was made in 1985.

== Botanical features ==
- Medium-late variety for chipping
- Round-oval tubers with medium to large size
- Flesh is white and have a high specific gravity, and medium-long dormancy
- Leaves are dark green
- Has four to seven inflorescences per plant
- 12 florets per inflorescence, and medium peduncle length

== Agricultural feature ==
- High level of resistance to common scab
- Moderately resistant to foliar early blight, powdery scab, pink rot, dry rot, and soft rot
- Fairly resistant to shatter bruise
- Yields are stable from year to year
