= Vitelotte =

French potato variety

Potato 'Vitelotte'
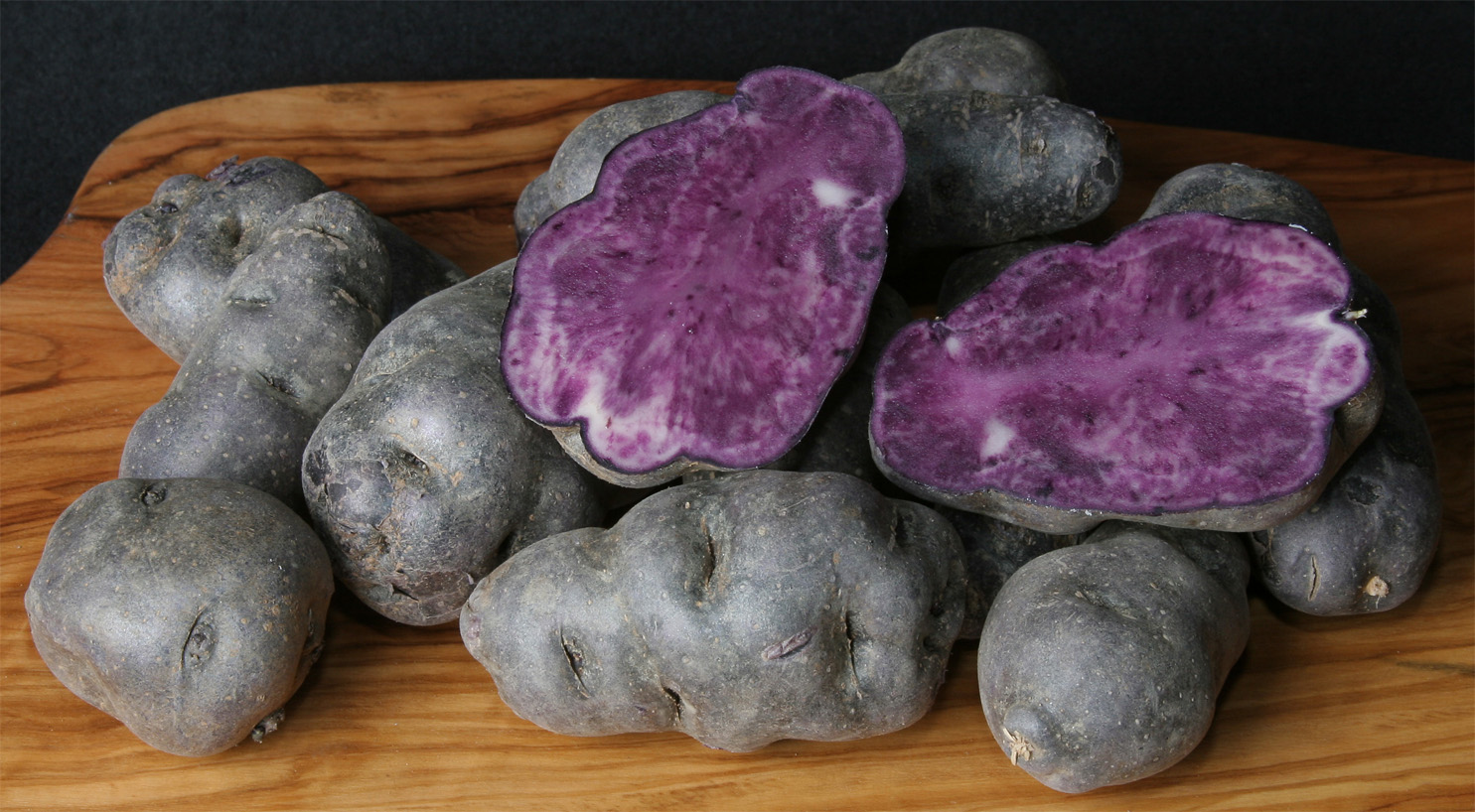
- 'Vitelotte' potatoes
- Genus: Solanum
- Species: Solanum tuberosum
- Cultivar: 'Vitelotte'
- Origin: France

'Vitelotte', also called Vitelotte noire, Négresse or Truffe de Chine, is a gourmet French variety of blue-violet potato. It has been cultivated in France at least since the early nineteenth century.

== Description ==
'Vitelotte' potatoes have a dark blue, almost black, skin and dark violet-blue flesh; they have a characteristic nutty flavour and smell of chestnuts. The colour is retained in cooking, and is due to natural pigments in the anthocyanin group of flavonoids. The plants mature late and, compared to modern varieties, are relatively low-yielding. The tubers are elongated with sunken eyes; they are thick-skinned, and thus keep well.

== Etymology ==
The French word vitelotte derives from the archaic French: vit, meaning "penis" (modern French bite), by analogy with the shape of the tuber. The first occurrence of the word is from 1812.

== History ==
In early descriptions, vitelotte were not necessarily violet-coloured. In a source from 1817, six varieties of potato are listed as available at the market of Les Halles; among them are both vitelotte and violette ("violet"). A treatise on agriculture published in 1863 lists five possible colours for the vitelotte: white, yellow, pink, red and violet. In 1873 Alexandre Dumas wrote in his Grand dictionnaire de cuisine:

"... the best of all are unquestionably the violet [ones], preferable even to the red [ones], [and] known in Paris by the name of Vitelottes'".

== Gallery ==
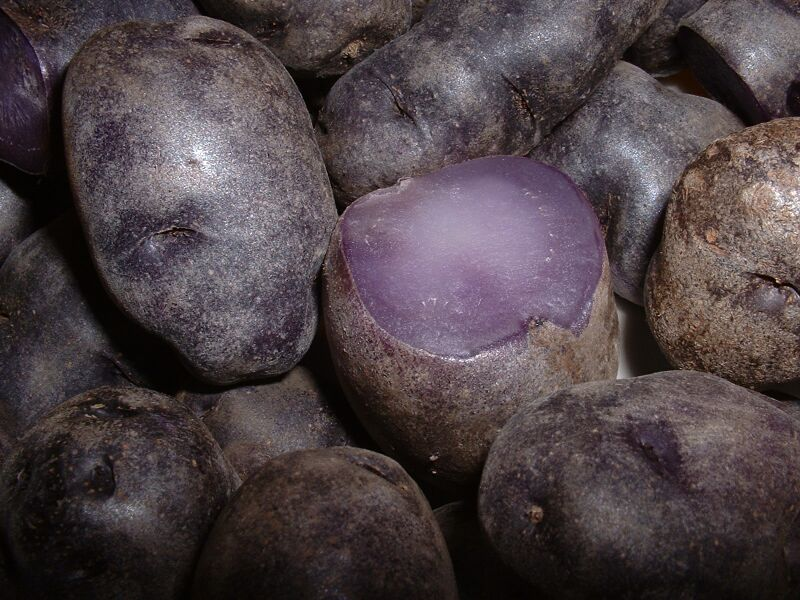

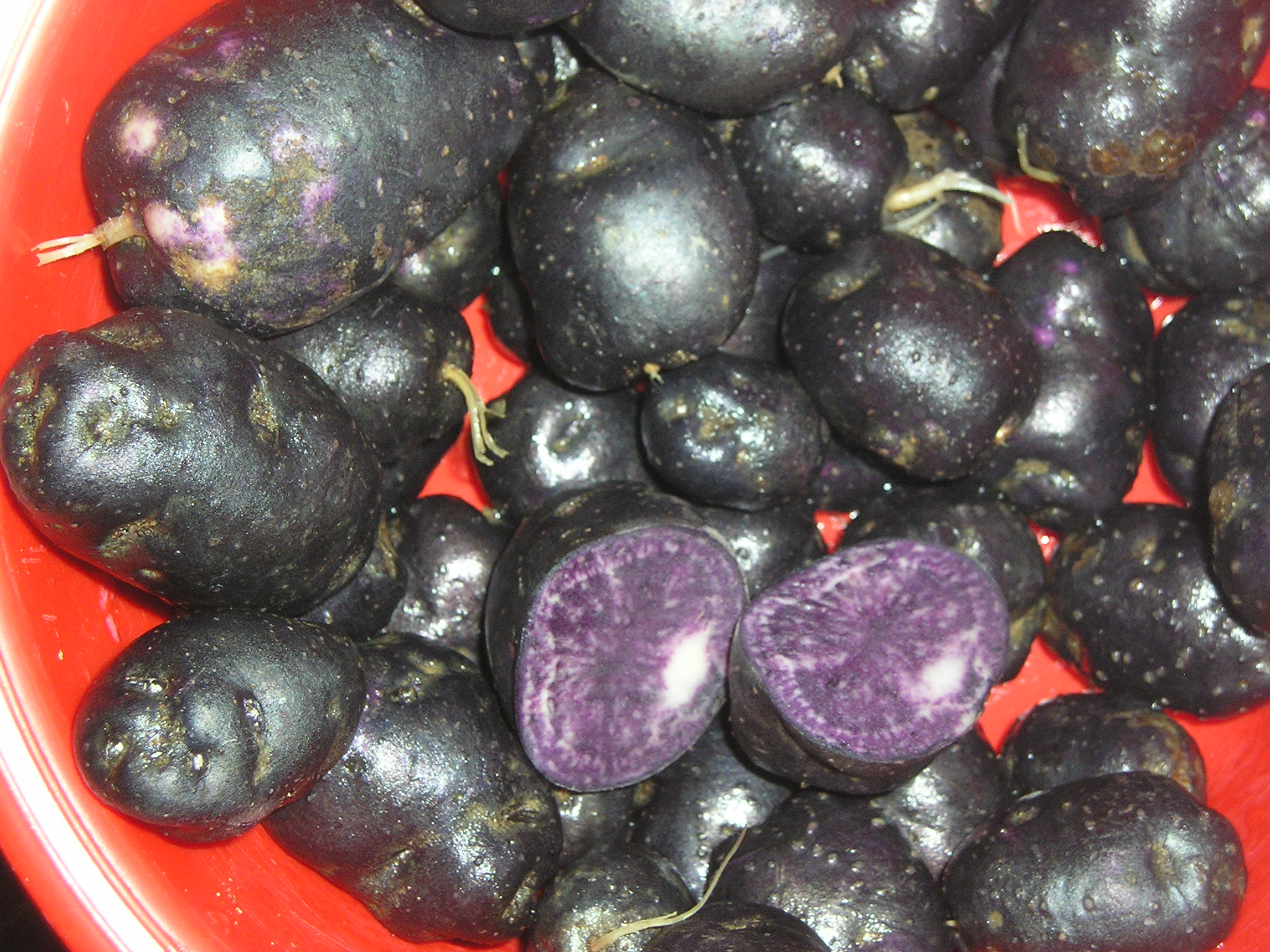
Whole and halved

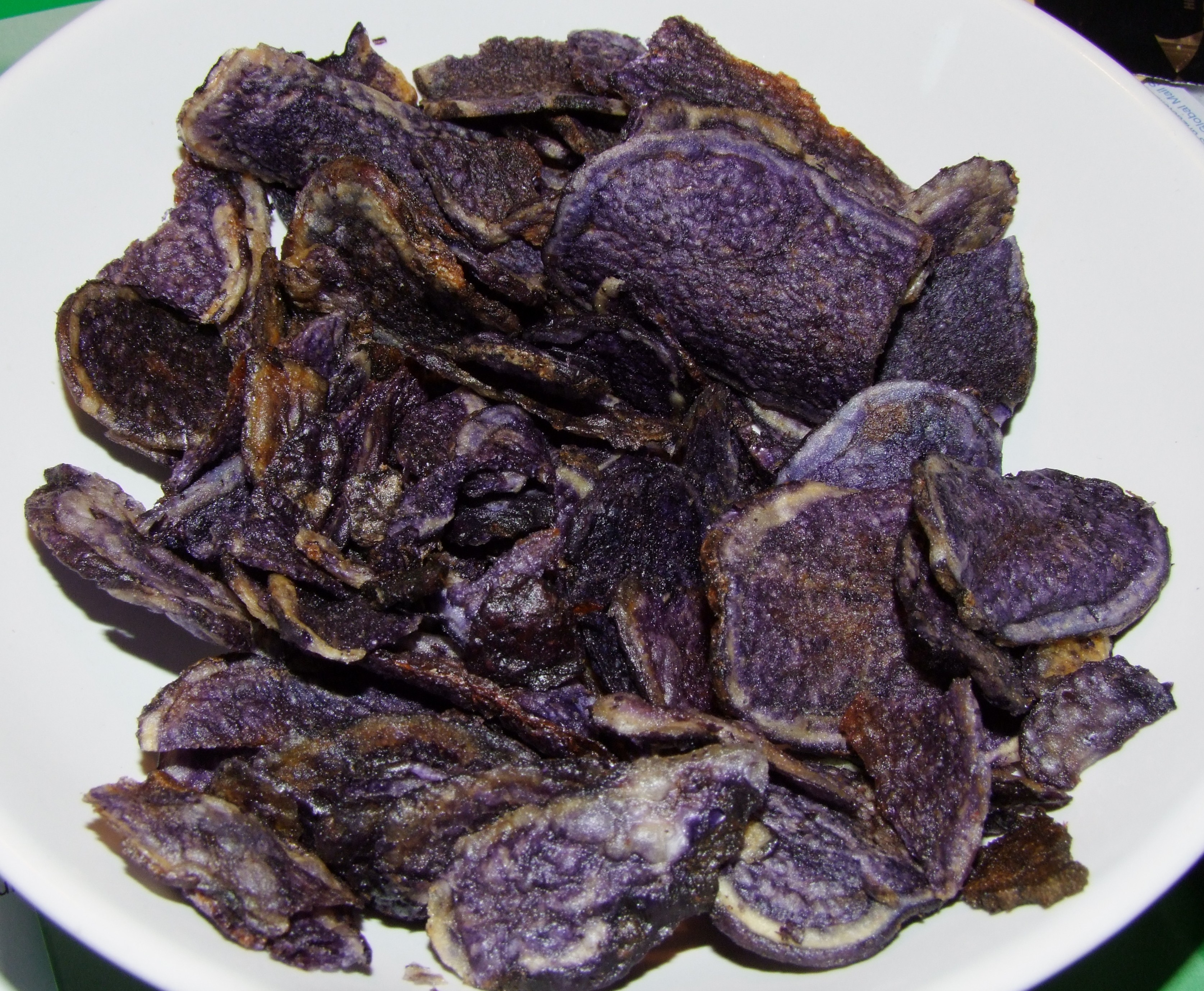
As potato crisps

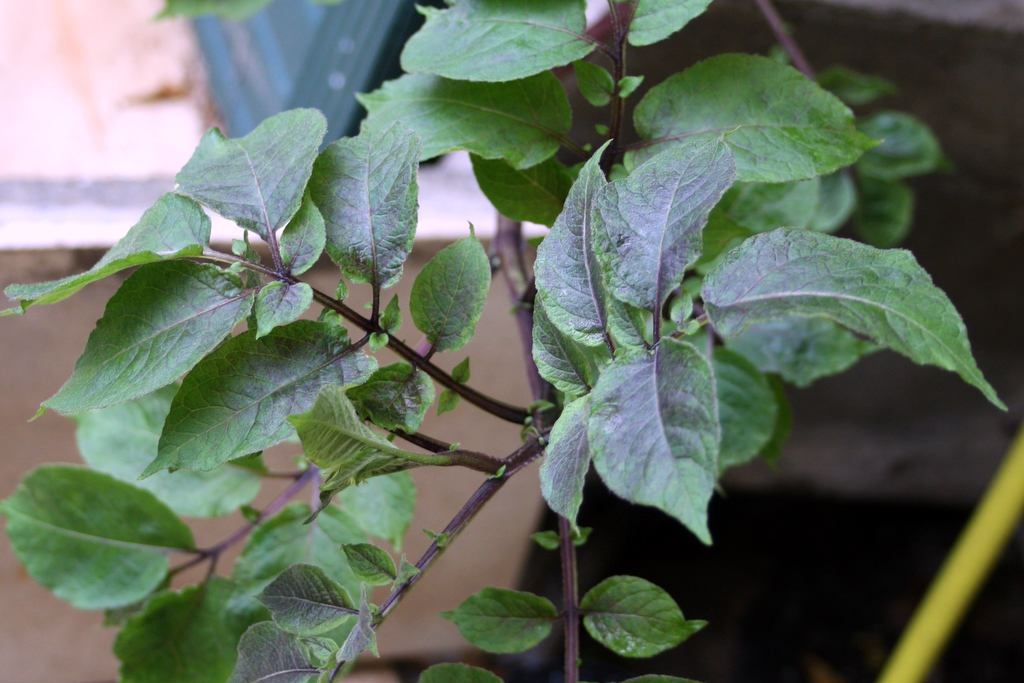
Leaves and stalks showing violet colouring
