= Kipfler potato =

Potato variety

Kipfler is a potato variety originating from Austria. The kipfler is elongated with a yellow skin and light yellow flesh. There are various families of these potatoes including the kerkauer kipfler from the Czech Republic or the naglerner kipfler from Germany. They are very popular in Australia.

== Nutrition ==
These potatoes contain manganese, potassium, fiber, copper and vitamin C.

== Etymology ==
The name Kipfler comes from the German kipfel, meaning 'croissant'.
