= Austrian Crescent =

Yellow potato variety

Potato 'Austrian Crescent'
- Genus: solanum
- Species: Solanum tuberosum
- Cultivar: 'Austrian Crescent'

Austrian Crescent is a medium maturing yellow potato variety. It is grown for specialty markets and stores well. It can be used in salads or for roasting.

It is also known as 'Kipfel', the German name for "croissant".

== Botanical features ==
- Tubers have a finger-like shape with medium depth eyes.
- They have a deep yellow, or pale yellow flesh with a darker yellow skin that has a smooth, or waxy texture.
