= Black Champion =

Variety of potato

- Genus: solanum
- Species: Solanum tuberosum
- Cultivar: Black Champion
- Origin: Ireland, pre 1936

Black Champion is a variety of potato with purple skin colour that produces round, flattened tubers. W.D. Davidson describes it as an, "old variety found growing in the Midlands of Ireland but of no commercial value." H.W. Kehoe notes them as, "unique to the Irish potato collection."

Its sprouts are purple and spherical, and it grows tall, erect plants with thin stems. Flowers are rarely grown, but they are an intense blue-violet colour with medium-sized white tips.
