= Russian blue potato =

Potato cultivar

Potato 'Russian blue'
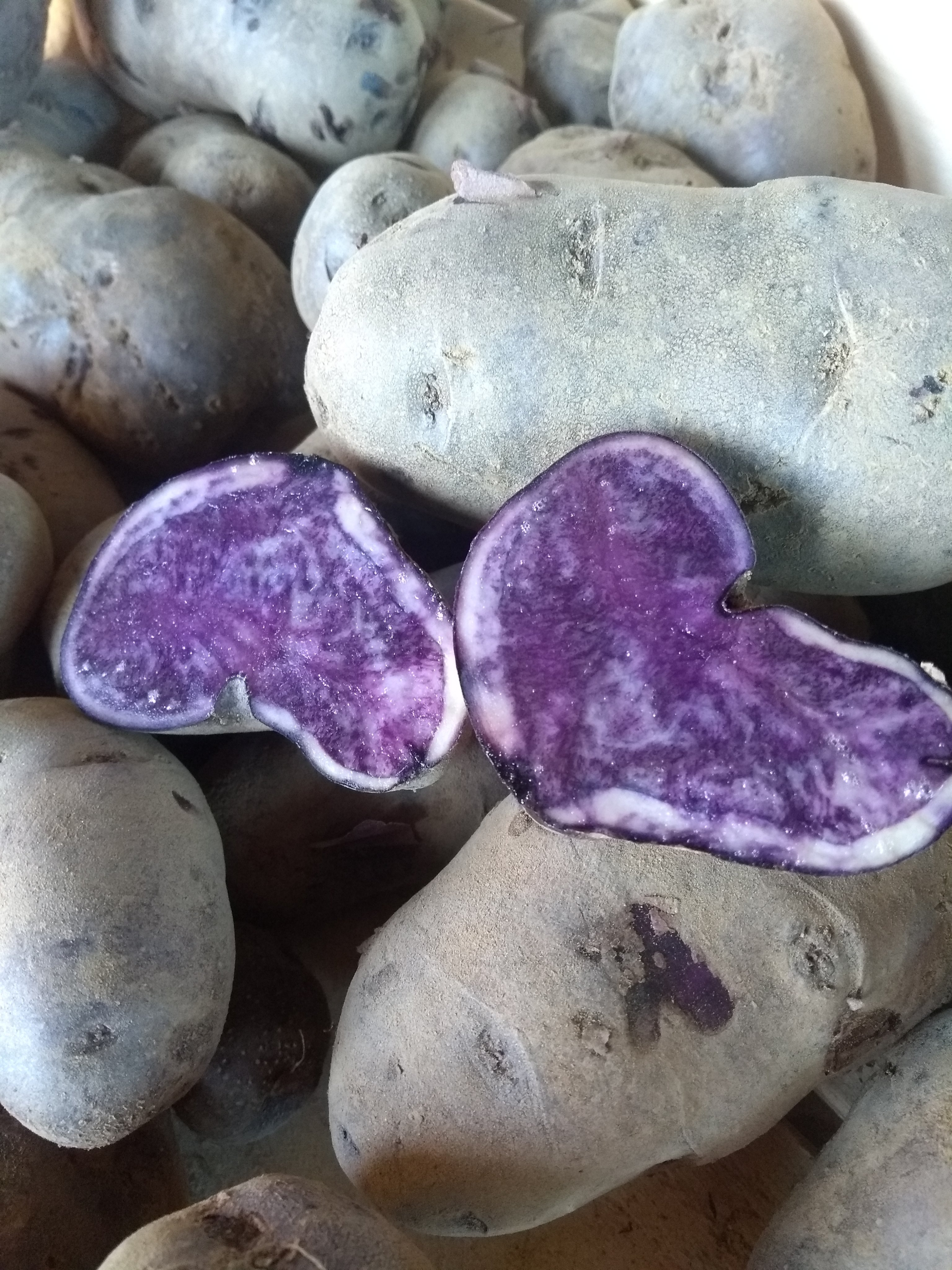
- Genus: Solanum
- Species: Solanum tuberosum
- Cultivar: Russian blue
- Origin: Russia

The Russian blue potato is a deep purple cultivar of potato believed to have originated in Russia.

== Characteristics ==
The Russian blue potato plant produces medium round and oblong tubers with deep purple insides. It is a late season variety of potato. The plants themselves are large, semi-erect, and produce light blue flowers and dark foliage.

== Development ==
Russian blues are believed to have originated before the 1900s.

== Cooking ==
Russian blues are rich in anthocyanin, vitamin C, potassium, and fiber. The potatoes retain their colour when cooked and have a similar texture to russet potatoes.
