= Kennebec potato =

White potato variety

Potato 'Kennebec'
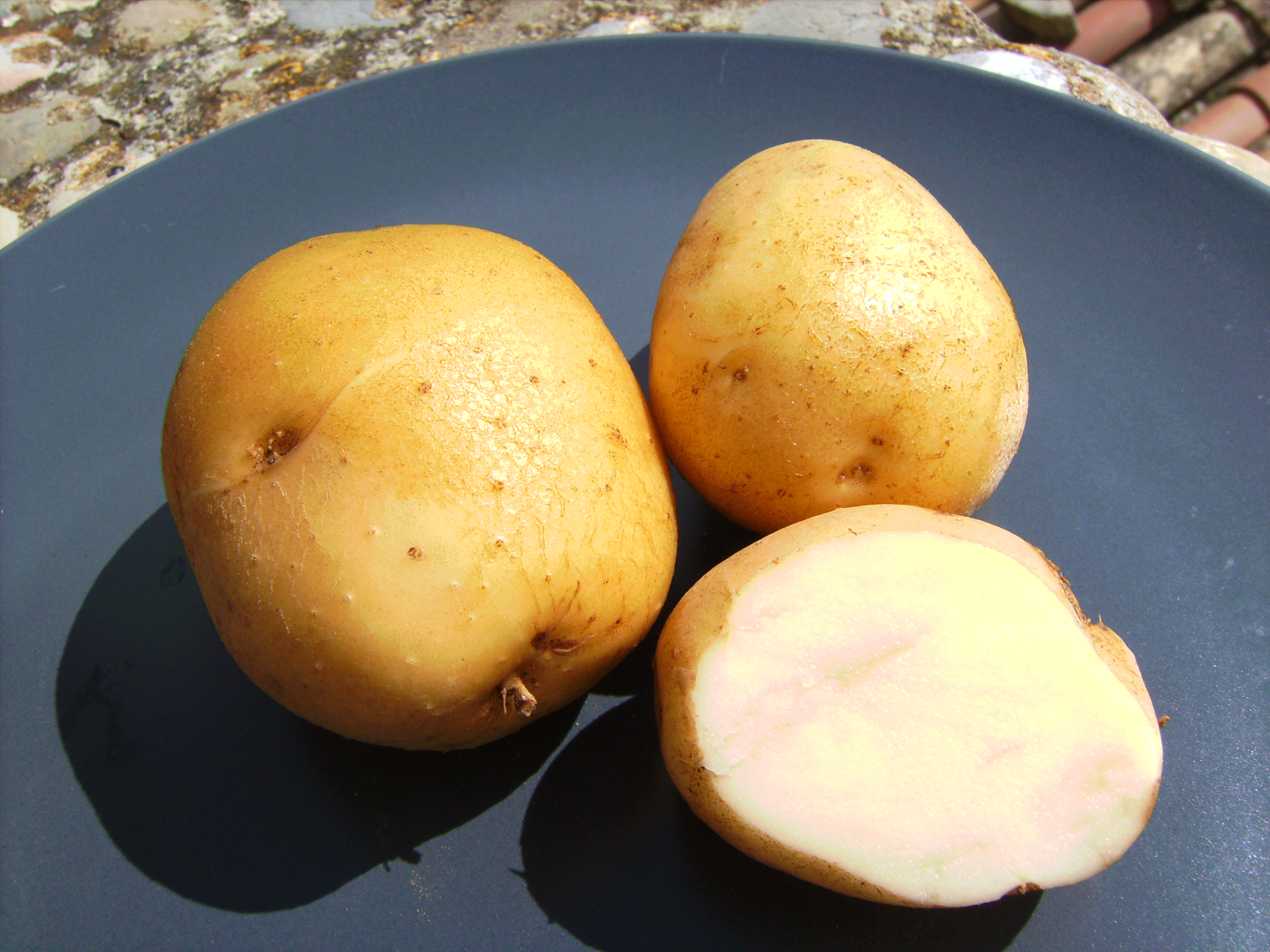
- Genus: Solanum
- Species: Solanum tuberosum
- Cultivar: 'Kennebec'
- Breeder: United States Department of Agriculture (USDA)
- Origin: Maine, USA in 1941

Kennebec is a medium- to late-maturing white potato. It was bred by the USDA and selected by Presque Isle Station, Maine, in 1941. Kennebec is not under plant variety protection. This fast-growing variety has high yields. It maintains good quality in storage and is grown for both fresh market use and for potato chip manufacturing.

== Botanical characteristics ==
- The Kennebec plant is non-pigmented, large and upright, with thick stems that are angled.
- Sprouts are grayish green with a slightly purple bottom.
- The leaves are broad, long and dark green with slightly pubescent midribs.
- Primarily the leaflets are ovate, large and grow in pairs of four. Secondary leaflets occur in a medium number. Tertiary leaflets occur very rarely, if at all. Terminally, the leaflets stay ovate and have acute tips and a lobed base.
- Very few of the large white flowers emerge from the scantly pubescent green buds.
- Tubers are medium thick with an elliptical to oblong shape. The skin is smooth and creamy with shallow eyes.

== Agricultural characteristics ==
- Kennebec is resistant to tuber net necrosis, which Potato leafroll virus causes.
- It is moderately resistant to foliage late blight, black leg, fusarium dry rot, phoma rot, potato wart, seed-piece decay, PVS and PVX.
- It is susceptible to common scab, fusarium dry rot, tuber late blight, leaf roll, pink eye, and Rhizoctonia.
- It is highly susceptible to Verticillium wilt.
