= Fingerling potato =

Type of potato

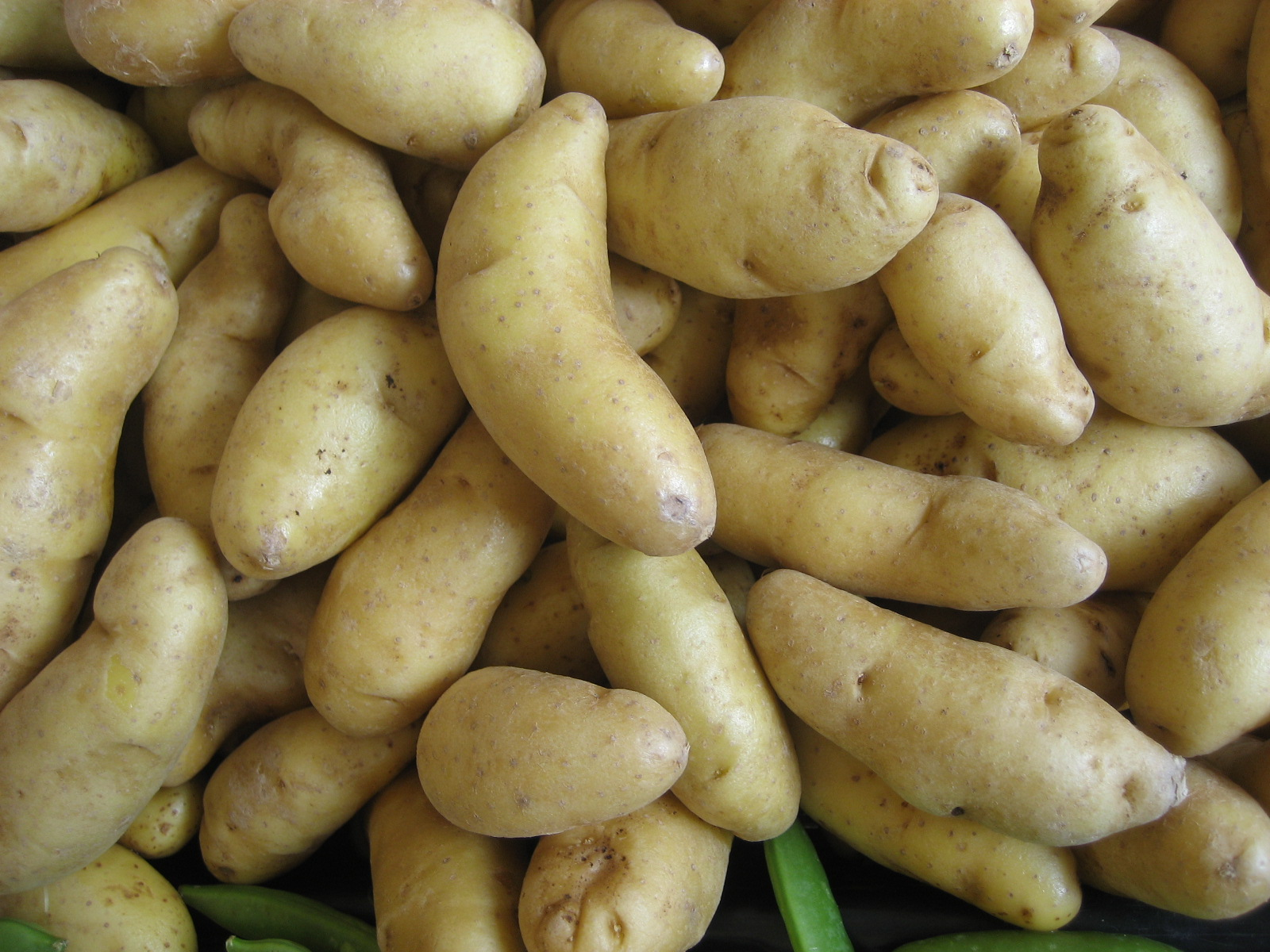
Russian Banana fingerlings from Pike Place Market

A fingerling potato is a small, stubby, finger-shaped type of potato which may be any heritage potato cultivars. Fingerlings are varieties that naturally grow small and narrow. They are fully mature when harvested and are not to be confused with new potatoes. Popular fingerling potatoes include the yellow-skinned Russian Banana, the pink-skinned, yellow fleshed French Fingerling, the Purple Peruvian, and the Swedish Peanut Fingerling. Generally more expensive than other sorts of potatoes, and of a smaller size, fingerling potatoes are commonly halved and roasted as a side dish or used in salads.
