= Kerr's Pink =

Variety of potato

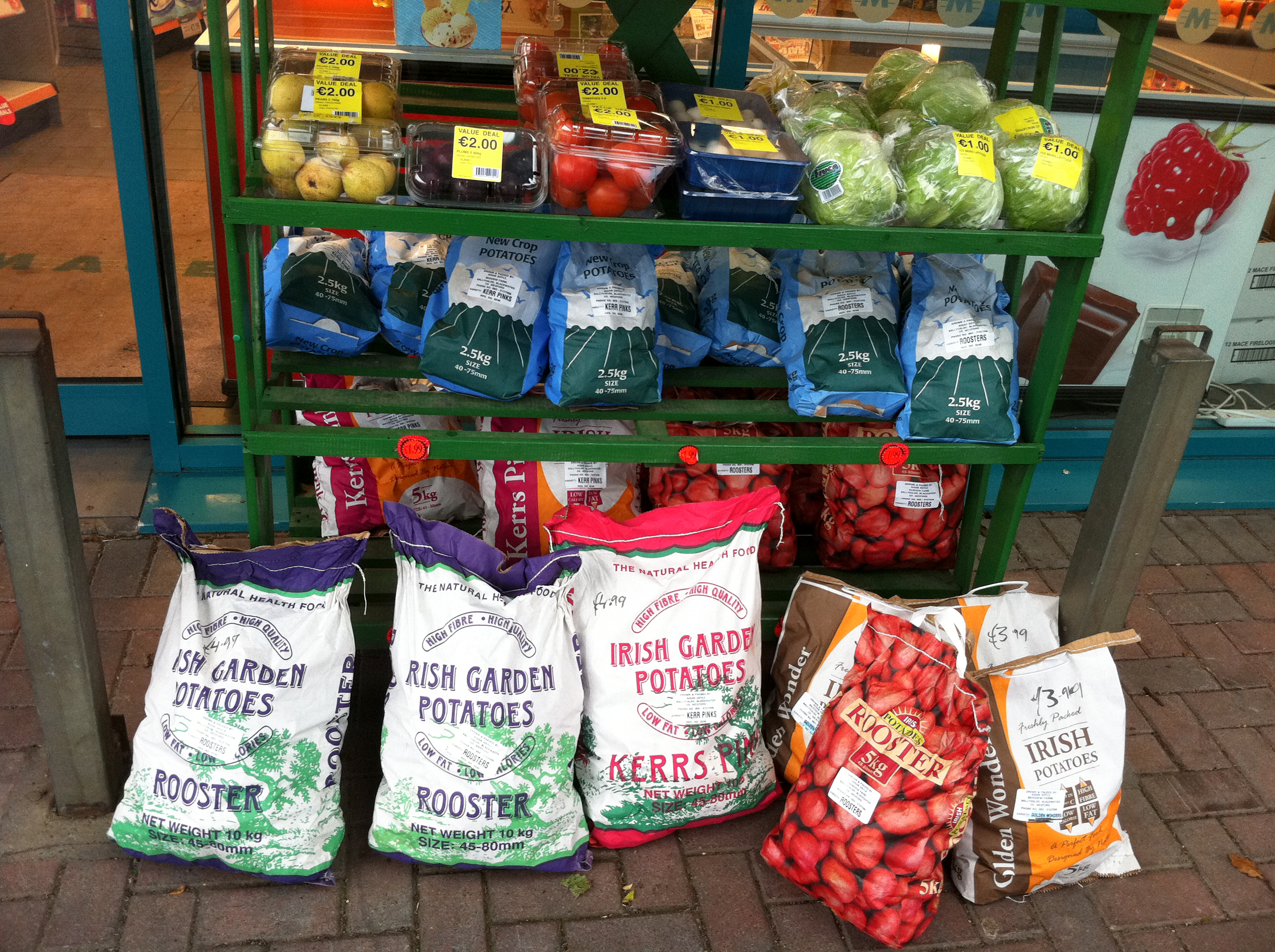
- Kerr's Pink for sale at a petrol station in Ireland
- Genus: Solanum
- Species: Solanum tuberosum
- Cultivar: 'Kerr's Pink'
- Origin: Cornhill, Scotland, 1907

Kerr's Pink is a potato cultivar in wide production in Ireland and the United Kingdom and many other countries.

In 2002, it accounted for 25% of potato production in Ireland, making it the nation's second largest variety.

'Kerr's Pink' potatoes have a distinctive pink colour with deep eyes. They are starchy and floury. They are appropriate for mashing and boiling but can also be chipped.

'Kerr's Pink's grow with many tubers and can catch potato blight very easily. They have a slightly low resistance to common scab and tend to have a low resistance to potato cyst nematode (pallida) and potato cyst nematode (rostochiensis). The variety has an average resistance to powdery scab and blackleg. It has a very high resistance to slugs and a relatively high resistance to splitting.
