= Stobrawa potato =

Potato variety

Potato 'Stobrawa'
- Genus: Solanum
- Species: Solanum tuberosum
- Cultivar: 'Stobrawa'

Stobrawa is a cultivar of Polish potato (also known as 'Mila' and 'Glada') used for food and vodka distilling. It has high levels of starch.
