= Mizen potato =

Potato variety

Mizen
- Species: Solanum tuberosum
- Cultivar: 'Mizen'
- Origin: Ireland, 1978

Mizen is a high-yielding creamy yellow skinned potato that produces long, smooth-skinned tubers with good resistance to foliar and tuber blight. Flesh is white with medium dry-matter content. Mizen is one of the potato varieties bred in the 1970s at Teagasc Oak Park breeding centre in County Carlow, Ireland.
