= Irish Lumper =

Variety of potato

Potato 'Irish Lumper'
- Genus: Solanum
- Species: Solanum tuberosum
- Cultivar: 'Irish Lumper'

The Irish Lumper is a varietal white potato of historic interest. It has been identified as the variety of potato whose widespread cultivation throughout Ireland, prior to the 1840s, is implicated in the Irish Great Famine in which an estimated one million died.

== Agricultural features ==
The 'Irish Lumper' is noted for its ability to flourish on garden beds that are poor in nutrients, wet-footed, or both. Until the 1840s, it was closely adapted to growing conditions in Ireland, particularly western Ireland. The Department of Agriculture, Fisheries and Food of Ireland noted that the Lumper was a "very old variety, and ... probably well known when first recorded by Dutton (1808) in his Agricultural Survey of County Clare. ... It was described by Andrews (1835) as a 'coarse species' and was recommended by Howden (1837) as stock feed due to its enormous yield."

In the 1840s, infestations of Phytophthora infestans devastated a series of potato harvests, leading to widespread famine and emigration. The cumulative effects of both catastrophes, exacerbated by British rule, lowered Ireland's total population by approximately two million, of which approximately one million were fatalities.

After almost disappearing from cultivation, the 'Irish Lumper' was regrown, starting in 2008, by Michael McKillop of County Antrim for harvest sale as an heirloom variety.

== Culinary use ==
The 'Irish Lumper' has been characterized as a "wet, nasty, knobbly old potato". Its texture upon boiling is described as more "waxy" than "floury", indicating a starch content on the lower side of that typical for white potatoes.

== Educational use ==
Schools in Ireland are starting to cultivate the Irish Lumper as a project of historical education. They are cultivated in raised garden beds, in the pattern of the 1840s.
