= Atlantic potato =

Potato variety

Potato 'Atlantic'
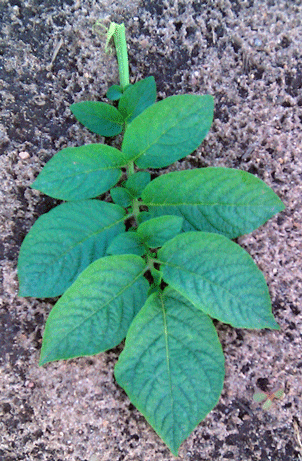
- 'Atlantic' potato leaf
- Genus: solanum
- Species: Solanum tuberosum
- Cultivar: 'Atlantic'
- Origin: Beltsville, USA

The Atlantic potato is a mid-season potato variety for potato chip manufacturing. It was developed and released by USDA Agricultural Research Service scientists at Beltsville, Maryland, in 1978. The variety is not under plant variety protection. It is a progeny of a cross between 'Wauseon' and 'Lenape'. It is widely grown for chipping directly off the field or with short-term storage. Marketable yields are fairly high.

== Botanical features ==
- Plants are moderately large and have thick, upright stems with slightly swollen nodes.
- Leaves are bright medium green and also have prominent wings. The primary leaflets are large and asymmetrical with numerous secondary and tertiary leaflets.
- Flowers are abundant and are white with a light violet corolla. Pollen is also abundant and is produced on orange anthers.
- Tubers (potatoes) are oval to round with moderate to shallow eyes.
- Tuber skin is brown and light to heavily netted.
- Flesh is white and has a high specific gravity.

== Agricultural features ==
- It has moderate to high yields and is widely adapted, and used for potato chips.
- It is highly resistant to race A of golden nematodes, potato virus X, and tuber net necrosis, which is caused by potato leafroll virus.
- It is resistant to pinkeye and tolerant to common scab and Verticillium wilt.
- It is susceptible to potato virus Y. Hollow heart and heat necrosis can also be a serious problem.
