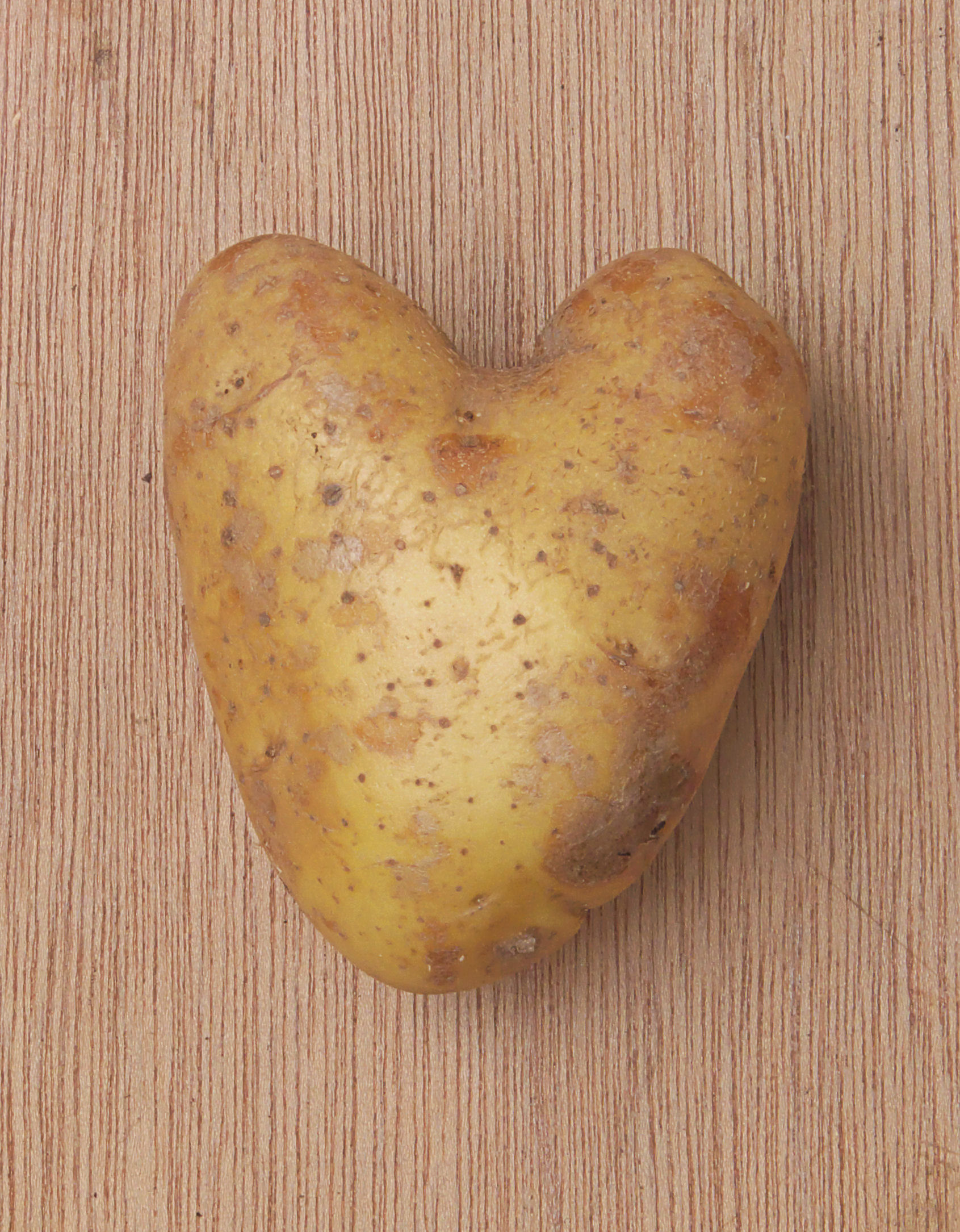
- A tuber with silver scurf blemishes

Scientific classification
- Kingdom: Fungi
- Division: Ascomycota
- Class: Dothideomycetes
- Order: Pleosporales
- Family: Massarinaceae
- Genus: Helminthosporium
- Species: H. solani

Binomial name
- Helminthosporium solani Durieu & Mont.

Synonyms
- Brachysporium solani (Durieu & Mont.) Sacc.; Dematium atrovirens Harz; Spondylocladium atrovirens (Harz) Harz ex Sacc.; Helminthosporium atrovirens (Harz) E.W. Mason & S. Hughes

= Helminthosporium solani =

Species of fungus

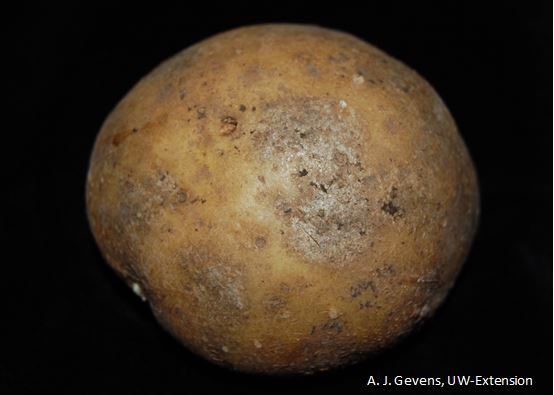
Silver scurf blemishes on a tuber

Helminthosporium solani is a fungal plant pathogen responsible for the plant disease known as silver scurf. Silver scurf is a blemish disease, meaning the effect it has on tubers is mostly cosmetic and affects "fresh market, processing and seed tuber potatoes." There are some reports of it affecting development, meaning growth and tuber yield. This is caused by light brown lesions, which in turn change the permeability of tuber skin and then it causes tuber shrinkage and water loss, which finally causes weight loss. The disease has become economically important because silver scurf affected potatoes for processing and direct consumption have been rejected by the industry. The disease cycle can be divided into two stages: field and storage. It is mainly a seed borne disease and the primary source of inoculum is mainly infected potato seed tubers. Symptoms develop and worsen in storage because the conditions are conducive to sporulation. The ideal conditions for the spread of this disease are high temperatures and high humidity. There are also many cultural practices that favor spread and development. There are multiple ways to help control the disease.

== Signs and symptoms ==
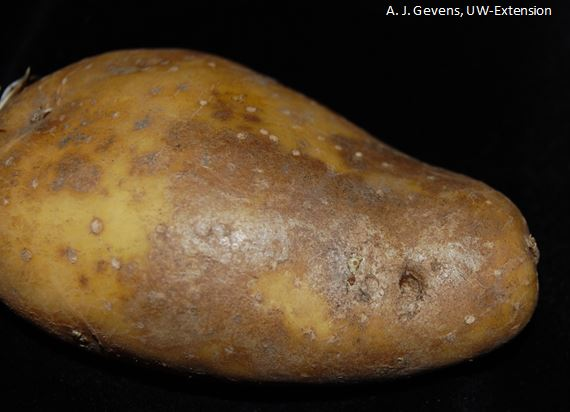
Silver scurf blemishes on a tuber

Silver scurf is a plant disease of potato, which is caused by the anamorphic ascomycete fungus, Helminthosporium solani. Potato tubers are the only known host of Helminthosporium solani. It is a highly specific pathogen which does not have a secondary host or alternate host. A common symptom of this disease is blemishing on the surface of the potato tubers. These blemishes are tan and/or gray due to a loss of pigment, and they are usually irregularly shaped. Also, a post-harvest symptom can be shrinkage and shriveling of the outer tissue of the potato due to water loss. Black spots can also be found on the surface of infected tubers, which are a sign of the disease. These are made up of conidia and conidiophores of the pathogenic fungus. The conidia are characterized by being very darkly melanized and having multiple pseudosepta. Another characteristic of this fungus is the absence of motile spores.

Like with many other fungal plant diseases, a diagnosis can be made by looking for the specific sexual structures of the fungus and observing them for the specific characteristics of silver scurf. Another way that silver scurf can be diagnosed is through molecular techniques, such as PCR and sequencing to identify the presence of the pathogen. The primer pair, HSF19-HSR447, has been generated to be specific for amplifying only a section of Helminthosporium solani DNA.

Currently, no known host factors have been identified that have been linked to increase susceptibility or development of the disease. It seems as though the environmental conditions are what plays a major role in severity of the disease.

== Disease cycle ==
The disease cycle of silver scurf can be divided in two phases (field and storage). The primary source of inoculum is infected potato seed tubers. This inoculum is then transferred to the daughter tubers through an unknown mechanism, although indirect evidence suggests it happens when they come in direct contact or close proximity to daughter tubers. Conidia produced on the surface of seed tubers are dispersed by rain or irrigation to uninfected tubers. These conidia germinate and infect tubers. The pathogen enters through the periderm or lenticels. After that, the pathogen colonizes the periderm cells in the tuber. Infection may happen when tubers are formed and can continue in the season. In harvest (mostly in summer), silver scurf symptoms are not too apparent. However, the symptoms develop and worsen due relatively humid and warm temperatures in storage, since these conditions are conducive to sporulation. Secondary inoculum is produced by conidia, which can spread in storage by wind of ventilation while the tubers are in storage. When a seed tuber from this storage is planted, this can then carry inoculum to the field. It was believed that overwintering soil-borne inoculum wasn’t important in the disease cycle, but recent studies suggest H.solani may survive in the soil for a short period of time, which can cause more infection.

This is an imperfect fungus and its teleomorph has not been described. Disease symptoms appear on tubers, but not on the haulm (vine) or roots, and are limited to the periderm, composed of phellem, phelloderm and cortical layers that replace the epidermis of the tuber. See next section (Environment) to understand the occurrence and severity of the different stages of the life cycle mentioned here.

== Environment ==
There are a number of conditions that favor the spread and development of H. solani. Usually, the temperature range of 15 – 32 °C combined with high humidity increase conidial germination. In addition to this, there are many cultural practices which affect the conditions that favor disease spread and development. These practices include: the level of H. solani present on the seed, planting and harvesting dates, crop rotations and warehouse management. It has been demonstrated that later harvest dates increase the development of the disease. It has also been demonstrated that the disease was more severe when planting densities were higher. All of these factors combined have an effect of disease spread and development.

== Pathogenesis ==
The spores can still infect and cause disease in daughter tubers in the soil for about two years. It is also possible for the pathogen to spread by growing through the roots of a potato plant to the developing tubers and cause infection. H. solani conidia are found on the outside of potato tubers, and the hyphae enter the tuber to cause disease. The pathogen can enter the tissue through wounds or natural openings, as well as being able to directly penetrate the periderm with the use of an appressorium and penetration peg. The fungus is contained in the outer layers of the potato and cannot infect very deep into the tuber. The discoloration on the periderm of the potato is formed from the loss of pigmentation caused by extreme dryness of the cell and suberin deposition. Not much is currently known about the molecular aspects of the mechanism for spread and infection of the disease, but there is currently ongoing research on this pathogen to gain a better understanding.

== Disease control ==
=== Chemical control ===
Fungicides control many plant diseases efficiently, but very limited types of fungicides are efficient against the silver scurf pathogen. Fungicides usually apply to soil or seed tubers before culturing.

==== Thiabendazole (TBZ) fungicide ====
TBZ is widely used as post-harvest treatment on potatoes since the early 1970s. Silver scurf on tubers can be reduced by the systemic broad-spectrum fungicide TBZ. TBZ is low toxicity and is used to prevent or control silver scurf for short time period, e.g. several months, with no effect on quality or retention of residues.

==== TBZ-resistant H. solani isolates ====
The TBZ fungicide used to be very effective until 1977 when TBZ-resistant H. solani isolates were found in potato stores, as post-harvest treatment. TBZ resistance in H. solani resulted from a point mutation of a single base at codon 198 from glutamic acid to glutamine, or alanine, in the b-tubulin. This mutation functions in avoiding TBZ and other benzimidazole fungicides from binding to the H. solani b-tubulin gene thus results in TBZ-resistant phenotypes.

==== Fungicides besides TBZ ====
As the frequency of resistant isolates to TBZ increase, some other fungicides have been tested to control silver scurf, such as imazalil, prochloraz and propiconazole fungicides, which are all classified in conazole, DMI (demethylation inhibitors). Imazalil and prochloraz fungicides are commonly used in seed treatment, while propiconazole fungicide is usually for foliar treatment.

=== Host resistance ===
One of the major reasons for the increasing economic importance of silver scurf is the lack of high levels of resistance in potato cultivars.

Interspecific crosses with wild Solanum species have been used to increase disease resistance in cultivars of S. tuberosum. Genes from the wild tuber-bearing species Solanum demissum, Solanum chacoense and Solanum aculae, which have low sporulation of H. solani, have been incorporated into the background of some Canadian potato cultivars. These interspecific crosses and advanced selections are being screened for resistance to different diseases including silver scurf. However, no silver scurf-resistant cultivars of Solanum tuberosum have, thus far, been identified. There is lack of reports of silver scurf resistant potato cultivars.

=== Suppressive soils ===
Soil types influenced the development of silver scurf to a great extent, both at harvest season and the following three-month storage period. Some soils displayed suppressiveness in different levels. The results from experimental trials revealed a significant negative correlation between silver scurf disease severity, and soil NO_{3} content and Fe availability. NO_{3} had been negatively correlated with silver scurf disease previously. This provides a possible suppressive effect of these two soil components. NO_{3} is an efficient nitrogen source used by H. solani. Therefore, a direct adverse effect between silver scurf and NO_{3} is not likely to happen. A probable explanation for this observation is that NO_{3} could function on other soil microorganisms which possibly act as H. solani antagonists. These results indicated that microbial antagonists may be the key components contributing to soil suppressiveness and their antagonists may lead efficient biological control of silver scurf.

=== Biological control ===
Biological control is considered an attractive alternative to chemicals for the efficient, reliable, and environmentally safe control of plant pathogens.

A fungus of the genus Cephalosporium (now renamed Acremonium strictum) was able to decrease the dissemination of silver scurf in storage. Cephalosporium has shown the ability to significantly diminish sporulation, spore germination and mycelial growth of H. solani. However, Cephalosporium does not reduce silver scurf on previously infected potatoes.

In laboratory experiments, isolations from potato growing soil and the rhizosphere of potato plants during sprouting, Trichoderma hamatum, Trichoderma koningii, Trichoderma polysporum, Trichoderma harzianum and Trichoderma viride were the most inhibitory microorganisms to H. solani growth in vitro.

Achromobacter piechaudii, Bacillus cereus, Cellulomonadaceae fimi, Pseudomonas chlororaphis, Pseudomonas fluorescens, Pseudomonas putidaputida, and Streptomyces griseus were able to inhibit mycelial growth and/or conidial germination through the production of diffusible metabolites and that antibiosis was likely responsible fully or partially for their antagonism of H. solani.

==== Biopesticides ====
Serenade ASO (a formulation of Bacillus subtilis) has proved to suppress silver scurf, reduced both the incidence and severity of silver scurf under low disease pressure and delayed the beginning of silver scurf in storage for five months.

== Relevance ==
When silver scurf was first found in Moscow in 1871, it was considered as a minor plant disease. After an increase in silver scurf incidence from America, Europe, Middle East, Africa, China, and New Zealand since 1968, the disease was later considered a pathogen of major importance. Although the disease did not cause potato yield losses and only affected the cosmetic appearance of the tuber, it had a huge impact on the potato market. With growing consumer demands for attractive appearance in fresh market cultivars, silver scurf on potatoes with blemishes and discoloration have been rejected by the industry. Furthermore, the silver scurf causes water loss which makes it difficult to peel the tubers. The excess tuber shrinkage also causes weight loss in tubers. From the cosmetic effect, dehydration, and weight loss of the tubers, the fresh market is facing major economic losses from the disease even today. For example, the Idaho's potato industry lost about 7 to 8.5 million dollars from the silver scurf disease. Not only does the cost come from rejecting silver scurf diseased potatoes, but it also comes from an increase in the amount of time needed for sorting and inspecting every potato.
