= Potato virus Y =

Virus classification
- (unranked): Virus
- Realm: Riboviria
- Kingdom: Orthornavirae
- Phylum: Pisuviricota
- Class: Stelpaviricetes
- Order: Patatavirales
- Family: Potyviridae
- Genus: Potyvirus
- Species: Potyvirus yituberosi

Synonyms
- Potato virus Y brinjal mosaic virus datura 437 virus potato acropetal necrosis virus potato severe mosaic virus tobacco vein-banding virus

Species of virus

Potato virus Y (PVY) is a plant virus of the family Potyviridae, and one of the most important plant viruses affecting potato production.

PVY infection of potato plants results in a variety of symptoms depending on the viral strain. The mildest of these symptoms is production loss, but the most detrimental is 'potato tuber necrotic ringspot disease' (PTNRD). Necrotic ringspots render potatoes unmarketable and can therefore result in a significant loss of income. PVY is transmissible by aphid vectors but may also remain dormant in seed potatoes. This means that using the same line of potato for production of seed potatoes for several consecutive generations will lead to a progressive increase in viral load and subsequent loss of crop.

An increase in potato plant infection with viruses over the past few years has led to considerable losses to the South African potato industry. The increased rate of infection may be attributed to several factors. These include a marked decrease in the effectiveness and administration of chemicals used in vector control, the use of infected seed potatoes in cultivation, incorrect irrigation and farming methods as well as a lack of a sensitive, rapid and reliable method of detection. An increase in the average temperature of winters as a consequence of global warming has also led to an increase in aphid numbers, which in turn has led to an increase in viral distribution.

== Hosts, strains, and symptoms ==
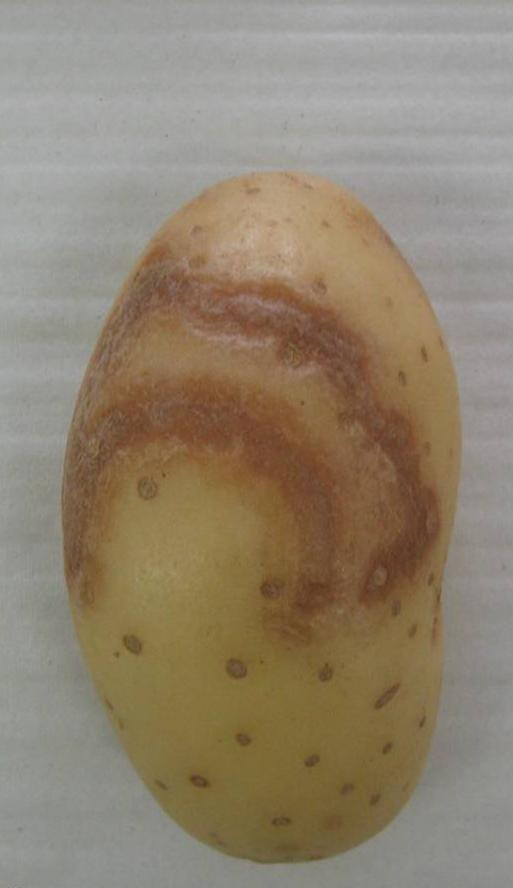
Potato illustrating necrotic ringspot disease

PVY belongs to the genus Potyvirus, the largest genus of plant viruses and possibly the most destructive one in potato crops. The genus includes more than 200 species that bring about significant losses in the agricultural arena. PVY infects many economically important plant species. These include potato (Solanum tuberosum), tobacco (Nicotiana tabacum), tomato (Solanum lycopersicum) and pepper (Capsicum spp.). The level of damage to crop is determined by the strain of PVY infecting the plants, the viral load, the time at which infection occurs as well as the tolerance the host possesses toward the virus. Resistance to PVY infection by hosts is low in many cases. Infection of a potato field with PVY may ultimately result in 10–100% loss in yield.

It has been shown that the PVY has different isolates according to the symptoms they induce in various potato plant species. Extensive biological, serological and molecular variability of PVY isolates makes the classification of isolates as particular strains particularly difficult. Occurrence of a variety of symptoms and the emergence of the necrotic PVY^{NTN} has led to a search for more reliable classification tools than simple serological identification. Traditionally three chief strains of PVY are recognized: PVY^{C}, PVY^{N} and PVY^{O}. PVY^{C}, originally known as Potato Virus C, was the first to be recognized and was identified in the 1930s. PVY^{C} induces hypersensitive responses in a wide range of potato cultivars. These reactions include the formation of mild mosaic patterns or stipple streak. Unlike the other strains of PVY, some PVY^{C} strains are non-aphid transmissible. Previous studies by Visser et al. did not identify any of the local isolates as being PVY^{C} but it has been reported to occur in potatoes in South Africa. A second strain of PVY is PVY^{N}. This strain was described in tobacco plants growing close to potato plants. PVY^{N} results in leaf necrosis and mild or even no damage to the tubers. The ordinary strain of PVY is denoted as PVY^{O}. Infection of a potato plant with the PVY^{O} strain results in mild tuber damage and does not cause leaf necrosis. Both PVY^{N} and PVY^{O} are aphid transmissible and occur in South Africa. In Europe these two strains have been shown to have recombined to form PVY^{NTN}. The PVY^{NTN} has been accredited with the ability to induce potato tuber necrotic ringspot disease (PTNRD). Tubers damaged by PTNRD become unmarketable and infection by PVY^{NTN} thus results in a larger economic impact than infection by the other strains.

== Transmission ==
PVY may be transmitted to potato plants through grafting, plant sap inoculation and through aphid transmission. The most common manner of PVY infection of plant material in the field is through the aphid, and although aphids on their own can directly damage potato plants, it is their role as viral vectors which has the greatest economic impact. In cold climates aphids spend the winter either as wingless aphids giving birth to live young (viviparae) or as eggs. Hosts such as weeds and other crops serve as breeding grounds for these aphids and form a temporary area of colonization before the aphids migrate to the potato fields. In moderate climates, such as in South Africa, aphids are thought to reproduce asexually on weeds, other crops, indigenous plants and garden plants. This means that there are a number of aphids present year-round. The importance in effective and stringent monitoring of aphid populations is stressed in a review by Radcliffe and Ragsdale (2002) as PVY virions are introduced to potato fields almost solely by winged aphids from a virus source outside these fields. Wingless aphids have not yet been linked to the spread of PVY in potato fields.

The green peach aphid (Myzus persicae) has been found to be most effective in its role as viral vector, but others such as Aphis fabae, Aphis gossypii, Aphis nasturtii, Macrosiphum euphorbiae, Myzus (Nectarosiphon) certus, Myzus (Phorodon) humuli and Rhopalosiphum insertum are also strongly associated with viral transmission. The Agricultural Research Council-Vegetable and Ornamental Plant Institute (ARC-VOPI) 6 of South Africa identified twenty five species of aphid able to function as PVY vectors. The efficiencies of some of these aphids to function as PVY vectors were also established (Ragsdale et al., 2001) and were found to vary between the different species. In South Africa, Aphis fabae, Aphis gossypii and Aphis nasturtii are the most common and efficient PVY vectors found in the field. Apart from being classed according to efficiency as vectors, aphids can also be divided into two subgroups, namely colonizing and non-colonizing species. Colonizing aphids are aphids which reproduce and establish themselves on potato plants, specifically, while non-colonizing aphids do not reproduce nor establish colonies on potato plants. Colonizing aphids are better adapted to life on potato plants and are thus generally considered as better PVY vectors than non-colonizing aphids. Noncolonizing aphids do not primarily feed on potato plants but do occasionally feed on them while searching for a more suitable host. Their lower efficiency as PVY vector is cancelled out by the sheer numbers in which they occur. Because of this, all aphids present in and around potato fields must be considered as possible vectors and their numbers carefully monitored.

Transmission of PVY by aphids occurs in a non-persistent, non-circulative manner which suggests a less intimate interaction between virion and vector than is the case of circulative virions. The fact that the virions are transmitted in a non-persistent fashion means that viral replication does not occur within the aphid vector and that, unless the aphid feeds on infected plants, it loses its ability to infect plants after two to three feedings. The virions attach to the aphid stylet in a matter of seconds and may remain infectious for four to seventeen hours. The distance over which the virions can be transmitted is limited due to the short period for which they remain infectious. Although the short life span outside plants inhibits long-distance viral transmission, it does not reduce the transmission efficiency bestowed by the quick rate of viral acquisition and inoculation within a field.

Upon entrance into the plant cell, the virus coat protein disassembles and releases its RNA genome. The viral RNA serves as mRNA, and although little is known about the translation thereof, it is believed that the 5’ non-coding region functions as an enhancer of translation. The translated mRNA results in a polyprotein which is processed into mature proteins. Each polyprotein is then cleaved into ten different proteins which are believed to be multifunctional. These proteins, along with host proteins, assemble to form a replication complex. This complex performs negative-strand RNA synthesis, using the positive strand of viral RNA as a template. Once the additional RNA copies have been produced, they code for the synthesis of various proteins, as mentioned before, as well as coat proteins. These coat proteins will now enclose the newly formed genomes to give rise to new virions. It has been suggested that enclosure of the newly formed virions is initiated by the interaction of the coat proteins with the 5’terminus and that the coat protein is built up towards the 3’terminus. The entire process of viral replication occurs within the endoplasmic reticulum. These newly synthesized viral particles are subsequently transported through the plasmodesmata to adjacent plant cells via several assisting potyvirus proteins. Distribution of viruses within the plant occurs according to the source-sink relationship between maturing and growing tissues. Virus concentration throughout the plant is high and this greatly increases the chance of uptake by aphids. Infection of plants by potyviruses can be varied in the symptoms shown. Infection can include veinal necrosis, mosaic symptoms as well as leaf malformation (Boonham et al., 2002). Infected plants that do not show symptoms may have infected canopies and will yield lower quality products than their healthy counterparts.

== Potato – PVY^{NTN} interaction ==
Since PVY^{NTN} causes great loss in potato production, the research of potato – potato virus Y^{NTN} interaction is important. Sensitive potato cultivars respond to PVY^{NTN} inoculation with development of typical symptoms. On inoculated leaves 5 – 7 days after inoculation chlorotic and necrotic ringspots develop. As the virus spreads through the plant the systemic symptoms develop on uninoculated leaves. 10 days after inoculation wrinkles and mosaic chlorosis appear, leading to a palm tree appearance (leaf drop).

The viral defense mechanisms of plants will primarily try to restrict the movement of the virus. In failing this, plants may attempt to induce cell death in infected tissue, thereby preventing the spread of virions. Although the precise mechanism of disease induction by potyviruses in plants is unknown, it is known that these viruses cause a significant shutdown of host gene expression during viral replication.

Physiological changes in potato plants as a response to PVY^{NTN} infection were intensively studied. At early stages of infection, meaning first 12 hours, photosynthesis related genes, genes involved in perception, signalling and defence response were shown to be differentially expressed. 24 h after inoculation the amount of salicylic acid increased.

A disruption in gene expression disrupts the normal cellular function of cells which could be the cause of the physical symptoms that the plant demonstrates. At the time of symptoms development, research on interaction between susceptible potato cultivar and PVY^{NTN} showed changes in cytokinin level. In inoculated leaves showing symptoms modifications in chloroplast structure and size, lower chlorophyll levels and differential activity of soluble and ionically bound peroxidases were detected.

At later stages of PVY^{NTN} infection total protein concentration increased in sensitive potato cultivar while no such pronounced changes were observed in tolerant and moderately tolerant potato cultivars. Gene expression studies revealed changes in expression of genes for heat-shock proteins, catalase, β-1,3-glucanase and genes involved in photosynthesis.

== Molecular description ==
Potyvirus virions consist of non-enveloped filamentous structures that are 680 – 900nm in length and 11 to 15nm in width. Morphologically the potyvirus capsid consists of approximately 2 000 copies of coat protein (CP).

The capsid encapsulates a single strand of positive sense RNA which is in the order of 10 kb in length and has a non-translated 5’-terminal region (5’-NTR) as well as a 3’-poly-A tail. The positive sense genome contains a single extended open reading frame and acts directly as mRNA. The 144 nucleotide 5’-NTR is particularly rich in adenine residues and has very few guanine residues. Rather than a conventional cap structure, the 5’NTR is associated with a Viral genome linked protein (VPg) which is said to act as an enhancer of transcription.

The 5’-leader sequence has an internal ribosome entry site (IRES) and cap-independent translation regulatory elements (CIREs). The IRES directs cap-independent translation through a mechanism similar to that used by eukaryotes. The extended open reading frame encodes for a 350 kDa polyprotein. This polyprotein is proteolytically processed by viral proteases (NIa, HC-Pro and P1) and undergoes co- and post-translational cleavage to yield several multi-functional proteins. These include the following: P1 (P1 Protein), HCPro (Helper Component Proteinase), P3 (P3 Protein), 6K1 (6-kDa Protein 1), CI (Cylindrical Inclusion), 6K2 (6-kDa Protein 2), VPg (Viral Protein genome-linked), NIaPro (Nuclear Inclusion Protein a, Proteinase domain), NIb (Nuclear Inclusion Protein b) and the CP (Coat Protein).

== Diagnosis and detection ==
=== ELISA ===
In the past, crops were inspected visually to determine whether or not they were disease free. Visual inspection was also used as a basis for seed certification. Determination of viral status through visual inspection is incredibly difficult as the symptoms may be masked or the infection latent. As a result, post season tests and inspections were introduced. These tests involved the cultivation of previously harvested material in greenhouses. The resulting plants were inspected for a more accurate estimate of viral status. Although this method of screening did offer some degree of monitoring of viral presence it was subjective and highly ineffective. Enzyme-linked immunosorbent assay (ELISA) screening of crops and seed potatoes replaced visual inspection in the early 1970s. The use of ELISA offered routine diagnostic laboratories a quick, effective and sensitive method of screening for a wide range of potato plant viruses.

Detection of pathogens using ELISA relies on the interaction between the antigen and specific antibodies and has become a popular and cost-effective means of routine detection. In an ELISA the solid phase can be coated with the sample of interest containing the antigen. The efficiency to which the antigen binds to the solid phase is dependent on temperature, length of exposure as well as concentration. Solid phases used include nitrocellulose membranes, paper, glass, agarose and polystyrene or polyvinylchloride microtiter plates. Microtiter plates are the most widely used solid phase because they are easy to handle, allow for automation and for analysis using microtiter plate readers. A drawback of these plates is that they are highly absorptive and this increases the incidence of non-specific binding of components used in the ELISA. Non-specific binding to the plates is reduced through the use of buffers containing proteins such as casein and non-ionic detergents such as Tween 20. After coating, excess sample is removed and the plate typically treated with a 1% casein containing solution. Subsequent to this the solid phase is treated with antibodies raised against the antigen of interest. After each incubation step the plate is washed with Tween 20 containing PBS. These washing steps are aimed to wash away any non-specifically bound components. Nonspecifically bound components are less strongly bound than the specific bound ones. Detection is achieved either through the addition of an enzyme-coupled antibody or the addition and detection of a biotinylated antibody. In a system using an enzyme-coupled antibody the subsequent addition of an appropriate substrate results in the formation of a colour proportional to the amount of antigen. Alternatively the plate can be coated with antibody followed by incubation with the sample that is to be detected. This, in turn, can be detected as described above and is then referred to as the double antibody sandwich (DAS) ELISA. Both of these systems, however, have a disadvantage in that coupling of the enzyme to the antibody may result in steric hindrance which in turn may result in a loss in function of the antibody and/or the enzyme. This may be overcome through the use of a biotin-avidin or biotin-streptavidin bridge. In this type of system biotin is coupled to the antibody. The biotin molecule has no influence on the working of the antibodies and is easily detected using avidin or streptavidin conjugated to a suitable enzyme. Streptavidin has an extremely high affinity for biotin which results in even a higher degree of specificity than a system in which the enzyme is coupled directly the antigen. To establish whether or not the antigen is present, a substrate specific for the enzyme used is added. The enzyme then converts the substrate to a coloured product and the colour intensity can be correlated to the amount of antibodies bound and thus the amount of antigen present. A DAS-ELISA has the advantage that it can increase the specificity of the ELISA and reduce the occurrence of non-specific binding. As a result, the DAS-ELISA principle is commonly employed in ELISA's for the detection of plant pathogens in plant sap without prior purification of the pathogen.

The ELISA is considered to be a safe, inexpensive and rapid method for detection of plant viruses. The inexpensive nature and relative simplicity thereof allows for it to be used as a workhorse within the agricultural sector and is used to screen thousands of samples per year as a result. Unfortunately ELISAs are not completely failsafe. Virus levels within potato tubers, which are screened by ELISA for use as seed potatoes, are normally low while the tubers are dormant. ELISA detection of viruses in these potatoes is difficult and absorbance values may fall below the set cut-off value. For this reason, seed tuber screening is performed on sprouting rather than dormant tubers. Although this results in more reliable readings than direct tuber testing, it does delay the certification of seed potatoes. Another disadvantage of an immuno-based detection method is that changes at the gene level may have an influence on the immunogenicity of the antigen to be detected. In terms of potato plant viruses, mutations within the CP gene may cause the CP to undergo conformational changes rendering antibodies produced against the previously present virus less effective.

=== RT-PCR ===
Reverse transcriptase polymerase chain reaction (RT-PCR) has become a powerful and effective method for detection of potato plant viruses within potato plant material and even dormant potatoes. Only a minute piece of plant material is required for analysis using RT-PCR. Considering the protocol described within this thesis, 0.1 g of plant material is enough for 14 500 separate reactions. During a RT-PCR specific target RNA sequences are amplified exponentially into DNA copies. For this to occur, however, the RNA of the virus must first be transcribed to DNA by means of a reverse transcriptase polymerase. This polymerase synthesizes a DNA strand using the RNA as template. This results in a DNA/RNA complex. For synthesis of a DNA strand from the RNA template only the reverse primer is required since the RNA is a single strand arranged from 5’ to 3’. Subsequently, the newly synthesized DNA strand is used as a template for traditional PCR.

Different types of reverse transcriptase polymerases are available to suit different needs and reaction conditions. Reverse transcriptase enzymes commonly used include AMV RT, SuperScript III, ImProm-II, Omniscript, Sensiscript and Tth RT. At the end of the RT step the polymerase enzyme is heatactivated. It could also be that the reverse transcriptase polymerase and DNA polymerase is one and the same enzyme and that the enzyme only requires a DNA polymerase activation step after the RT step. An example of such an enzyme is Tth polymerase. This enzyme has both RNA-dependent reverse transcriptase and DNA-dependent polymerase activity. However, the active center of the DNA polymerase is covered by dedicated oligonucleotides, called aptamers. At temperatures below the optimal reaction temperature of the DNA-dependent polymerase component of Tth remains covered by the aptamers. At these temperatures the Tth enzyme only synthesizes a DNA copy of the RNA template. Once the reaction temperature is raised to 95 °C, the aptamers are removed and the DNA-dependent polymerase component will start to amplify the target sequence.

PCR amplification of the DNA target occurs in three steps: denaturation, annealing and extension. Each of these steps occur at a specific temperature for a fixed period of time. Denaturation is normally allowed to occur between 90 and 95 °C and leads to the dissociation of DNA strands. After this the reaction is cooled to between 40 and 70 °C to allow the primers to associate with their respective target sequences. This step is known as the annealing step and is primer specific. The temperature at which the primers anneal is critical. Too high temperatures would not allow the primers to associate with the DNA, resulting in no or poor amplification. Too low annealing temperature would ultimately lead to non-specific binding of the primers and non-specific amplification. Primers bound to the regions flanking the target DNA provide 3’-hydroxyl groups for DNA polymerase catalyzed extension. The most commonly used DNA polymerase is Taq, a thermo-stable enzyme isolated from the thermophilic bacterium, Thermus aquaticus. The DNA polymerase synthesizes new DNA strands along the template strands, using the primers as starting points. During the extension step the strands are amplified beyond the target DNA. This means that each newly synthesized strand of DNA will have a region complementary to a primer. There is an exponential increase in the amount of DNA produced as the three above mentioned steps are repeated in a cyclic fashion. In a traditional PCR these steps might be repeated 20 to 55 times. A problem, however, with PCR amplification is that the temperature required for DNA strand dissociation also results in DNA polymerase denaturation. This is partially overcome by the bioengineering of polymerases which are more thermal stable and have longer half-lives.

Even though RT-PCR is technically more difficult to perform and more expensive than ELISA, it has the ability to allow for the detection of low viral loads. RT-PCR is considered to be 102 to 105 fold more sensitive than traditional ELISA. RT-PCR also allows for the detection of several viral targets in the same reaction through the use of several primer combinations. This is called multiplexing. Although multiplexing is technically more demanding than a traditional simplex reaction it allows for a higher throughput in that a single sample can be tested for several viral strains in a single reaction. Primers used for multiplexing are chosen in such a manner that they result in amplicons of various sizes. This allows for post RT-PCR analysis using gel electrophoresis. Although RT-PCR saves time, allows for multiplexing and is more sensitive than ELISA, the reagents and instrumentation needed are expensive and require a higher level of technical expertise. Also, end product analysis using gel electrophoresis is laborious, relatively more expensive, time-consuming and does not lend itself to automation. For these reasons the use of RT-PCR for routine screening is not feasible and has not replaced ELISA. It does, however, provide the industry with the opportunity to screen borderline cases, especially in the case of seed potato certification.

=== Quantitative PCR ===
In most traditional PCRs the resulting products are analyzed after the PCR has been completed. This is called end-point analysis and is normally qualitative of nature rather than being quantitative. For this sort of analysis, products are mostly analyzed on an agarose gel and visualized using ethidium bromide as a fluorescent dye. Direct correlation between signal strength and initial sample concentration is not possible using end-point analysis since PCR efficiency decreases as the reaction nears the plateau phase. Quantitative PCR, however, offers an accurate and rapid alternative to traditional PCR. Quantitative PCR offers the researcher the opportunity to amplify and analyze the product in a single tube using fluorescent dyes. This is known as homogeneous PCR. During a quantitative PCR the increase in fluorescence is correlated with the increase in product. Through the use of different specific, dyes quantitative PCR can be used to distinguish between different strains of a virus and even to detect point mutations. The major advantage of quantitative PCR is that analysis of resulting products using gel electrophoresis is not required. This means that quantitative PCR can be implemented as a high-throughput technique for sample screening.

Quantitative PCR has been described for detection and discrimination of PVY^{O} and PVY^{N} isolates and for reliable discrimination between PVY^{NTN} and PVY^{N} isolates.

== See also ==
- Viral diseases of potato
