= Streptomyces scabiei =

Scientific classification
- Domain: Bacteria
- Kingdom: Bacillati
- Phylum: Actinomycetota
- Class: Actinomycetes
- Order: Streptomycetales
- Family: Streptomycetaceae
- Genus: Streptomyces
- Species: S. scabiei

Binomial name
- Streptomyces scabiei Lambert and Loria

Synonyms
- Oospora scabies Thaxter 1892; Actinomyces scabies Gussow 1892; Streptomyces scabiei Truper and De'clari 1997

Species of bacterium

Streptomyces scabiei (also wrongly named Streptomyces scabies) is a streptomycete bacterium species found in soils around the world. Unlike most of the 500 or so Streptomyces species it is a plant pathogen causing corky lesions to form on tuber and root crops as well as decreasing the growth of seedlings. Along with other closely related species it causes the potato disease common scab, which is an economically important disease in many potato growing areas. It was first described in 1892, being classified as a fungus, before being renamed in 1914 and again in 1948. Several other species of Streptomyces cause similar diseases to S. scabiei but other, more closely related species, do not.

The genome of S. scabiei has been sequenced and is the largest Streptomyces genome known so far. The genome contains a pathogenicity island containing the genes required for S. scabiei to infect plants, and which can be transferred between different species. S. scabiei can produce several related toxins which are the most responsible for its pathogenicity, but several other systems have also been identified which contribute. It can infect young seedlings of all plants, as well as mature root and tuber crops, but is most often associated with causing common scab of potato.

== Taxonomy ==
The first known reference to common scab of potatoes, dates back to 1825, but it was not initially thought to have a biological cause. Isolates of an organism that causes common scab of potato were first isolated by Roland Thaxter in Connecticut in 1890 and in 1892 he described the primary strain as Oospora scabiei. The original culture was not maintained. In 1914 Hans Theodor Güssow renamed the species Actinomyces scabies, noting that Oospora was an incorrect classification since the disease was not caused by a fungus. The genus Streptomyces was first proposed by Waksman and Henrici in 1943, meaning 'pliant or bent fungus'. Most species of Streptomyces are saprotrophic feeding off dead matter with relatively few causing disease. In 1948 Waksman and Henrici used the name Streptomyces scabies to describe the species and this name was revived in 1989 by Lambert and Loria, who bought together 12 different strains that formed one homogeneous group. In 1997 the name was changed to Streptomyces scabiei following a grammatical convention as set out in Rule 12c of the International Code of Nomenclature of Bacteria. In 2007 Lambert and Loria recommended that the original name of Streptomyces scabies be kept due to its long-established use and it continued to be used until when in 2020, the International Committee on Systematics of Prokaryotes denied the request of Lambert and Loria.

In 1979 Elesawy and Szabo proposed it be assigned to the Diastatochromogenes cluster along with S. neyagawaensis, S. bottropensis, S. diastatochromogenes, S. eurythermus and S. griseosporeus, which was later confirmed by other authors based on morphological and genetic analyses.

=== Similar species ===
At least four other species of Streptomyces also cause diseases on potato tubers. The most widespread species other than S. scabiei are S. turgidiscabies and S. acidiscabies, which can be distinguished based on their morphology, the way they utilise food sources and their 16S RNA sequences. Unlike S. scabiei, S. acidiscabies is predominantly seed-borne rather than soil-borne and be suppressed using insecticides and nematicides, suggesting that microfauna play a role in its transmission. In 2003 three other species of Streptomyces that cause common scab symptoms were isolated in Korea and named S. luridiscabiei, S. puniciscabiei and S. niveiscabiei. They differ from S. scabiei by having spores that are of different colours. S. ipomoea causes a similar disease on sweet potato tubers.

There are also other species of Streptomyces found in scab lesions on potato tubers that do not cause disease. 16 distinct strains have been isolated from tubers and based on a genetic analysis of them, they are most similar to S. griseoruber, S. violaceusniger, S. albidoflavus and S. atroolivaceus.

== Description ==
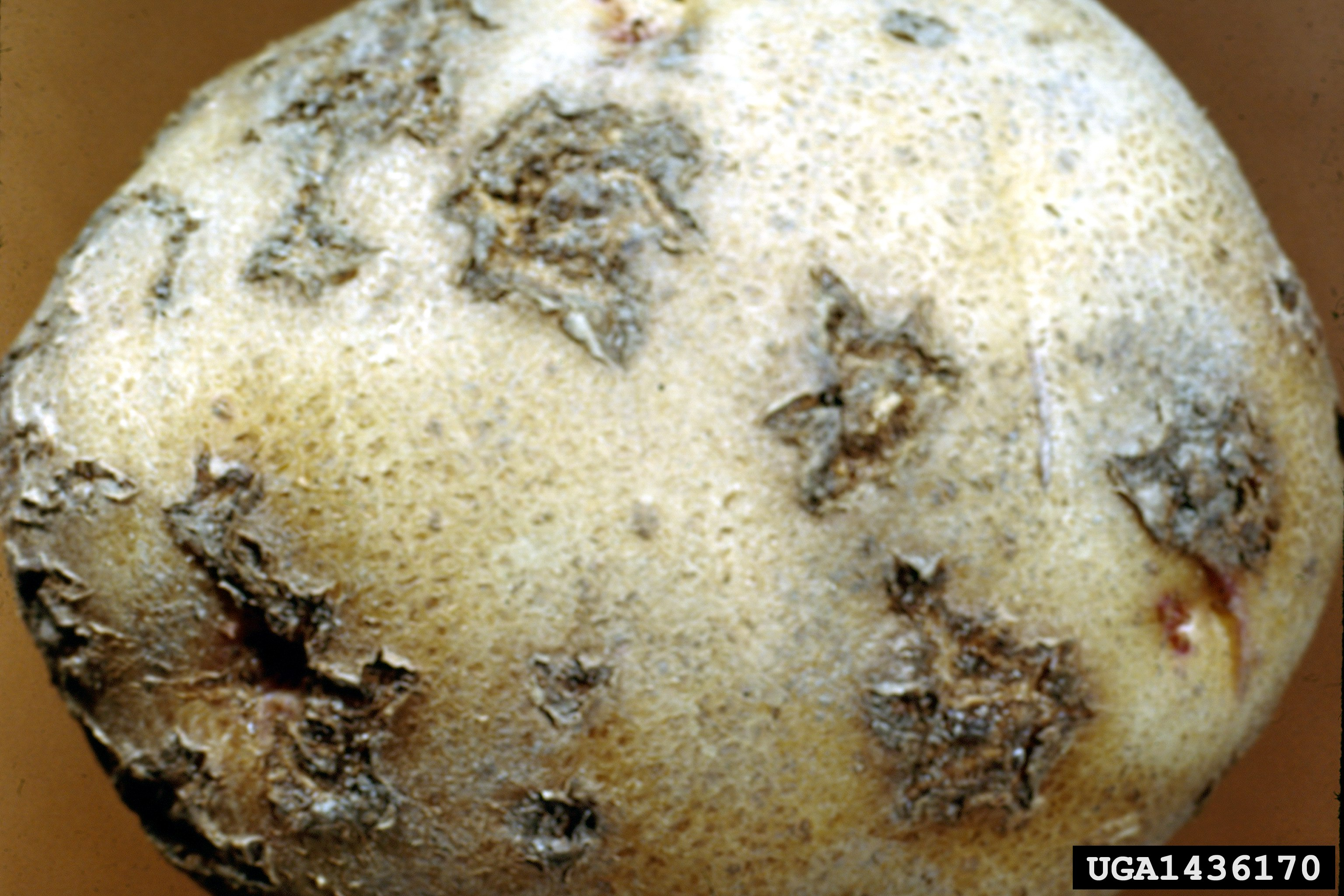
A potato infected by common scab

Streptomyces scabiei is a streptomycete bacteria which means it forms a mycelium made of hyphae, a growth form more usually associated with fungi. The hyphae of Streptomyces, are much smaller than those of fungi (0.5–2.0 μm) and form a heavily branched mycelium. They are Gram-positive and have a high proportion of the DNA bases guanine and cytosine (71%) in their genome. The genome of strain 87.22 has been sequenced and it is 10.1 Mbp, encoding 9,107 provisional genes. All Streptomyces genomes sequenced so far are relatively large for bacteria, but the genome of S. scabiei is the largest. When cultured on agar the hyphae develop aerial fragments which bear chains of spores, giving the culture a fuzzy appearance. The chains of spores have the appearance of corkscrews and are grey in colour. These chains allow it to be differentiated from other species that are virulent on potatoes. Each chain contains 20 or more spores that are 0.5 by 0.9–1.0 μm, smooth and grey. Bacteria are often distinguished by their ability to grow on media containing different substances, which they either feed on or that inhibit their growth. Defining characteristics of strains of S. scabiei are that they grow on the sugar raffinose, are unable to degrade xanthine and when grown on media containing the amino acid tyrosine, they produce the pigment melanin, the same chemical that gives humans their skin colour. This trait is often associated with their ability to cause disease, but it is not always present and is considered a secondary trait. They are killed by 10 IU of the antibiotic penicillin G per ml, 25 μg of oleandomycin per ml, 20 μg of streptomycin per ml, 10 μg of thallous acetate per ml, 0.5 μg of crystal violet per ml, and 1,000 μg of phenol per ml. The lowest pH at which they will grow varies slightly between strains but is between 4 and 5.5.

When it infects crops it causes corky lesions to form in the tuber or tap root. The lesions are typically brown, with a diameter of several millimetres but the size and colour can vary depending on environmental conditions. The disease does not affect the yield nor make the tubers inedible, but decreases the quality of the crop, which lessens their value or even makes them unmarketable. It is not possible to determine whether a plant is infected from observing the above-ground parts of the plant.

=== Similar diseases ===
There are other microbes that cause similar damage to potato crops to S. scabiei. In the UK the most common are the powdery scab caused by the protist Spongospora subterranea f. sp. subterranea and silver scurf and black dot caused by the fungi Helminthosporium solani and Colletotrichum coccodes respectively. Netted scab is thought to be caused by other species including S. reticuliscabiei.

== Virulence ==
The chemical structure of thaxtomin A

Cellobiose a sugar which is present in growing plant cell walls which S. scabiei detects and then starts to produce toxins

The main route by which S. scabiei is thought to enter into potato tubers is through the lenticels - pores for gas exchange in the skin of potatoes. Other evidence suggests that they are also able to directly penetrate the skin of the potato causing infection.

=== Toxins ===
Five toxins have been isolated from S. scabiei that induce the formation of scabs on potato tubers. They are classed as 2,5-Diketopiperazines, with the most abundant having the chemical formula C_{22}H_{22}N_{4}0_{6}. The first two to be isolated in 1989 were thaxtomin A and thaxtomin B, of which thaxtomin A was the predominant compound. Thaxtomin A and thaxtomin B differ only by thaxtomin B having a hydrogen at C_{20} rather than a hydroxyl group. Three years later the same group of researchers isolated several other toxins with similar structures to the first two they had isolated which are thought to be precursors to thaxtomin A. Thaxtomin A is considered to be essential for symptoms to appear and the pathogenicity of strains is correlated with the amount of thaxtomin A they produce. It is synthesised by a protein synthetase encoded by the txtA and txtB genes, forming a cyclic dipeptide which is then hydroxylated by a cytochrome P450 monooxygenase encoded by txtC. The dipeptide is then nitrated by an enzyme similar to mammalian nitric oxide synthase at the four position on the tryptophan residue. All the genes required for thaxtomin biosynthesis are located on one part of the genome, termed the pathogenicity island, that is also found in S. acidiscabies and S. turgidiscabies which is around 660 kb in length. The toxins are only produced once the bacteria have colonised a potato tuber and it is thought they detect potatoes by sensing certain molecules present in their cell walls. Cellobiose, a subunit of cellulose, activates thaxtomin production in some strains, but suberin also acts as an activator, causing many changes to the proteome of the bacteria after it is detected.

The target of the toxins is unknown but there is evidence that they inhibit the growth of plant cell walls. They are neither organ or plant specific and if added to the leaves of various species cause them to die, indicating that the target is highly conserved. Adding thaxtomin A to seedlings or suspended plant cell cultures causes them to increase in volume and onion root tips treated with it are unable to form cell plates suggesting that it affects the synthesis of cellulose. Inhibiting the production of cell walls may aid S. scabiei in penetrating plant cells, a key step in infection. The fact that scabs only form in regions of rapidly growing tissue is consistent with this hypothesis.

=== Other components ===
As well as genes that produce toxins, other genes have been identified which help S. scabiei to infect plants. A tomatinase enzyme, encoded by tomA which can degrade the antimicrobial saponin α–tomatine. The aerial growth of mutants lacking the gene is inhibited, but the mycelium is able to continue to grow. Nec1 is another protein that is required for virulence, which is secreted out of the bacteria. It is not clear how it leads to disease, but it may suppress the defense mechanisms that thaxtomin activates. Another gene cluster in the 87.22 strain is very similar to a cluster found in the Gram negative plant pathogens Pseudomonas syringae and Pectobacterium atrosepticum. The cluster produces coronafacic acid, part of the plant toxin coronatine which mimics the plant hormone jasmonate, contributing to virulence.

In 2007 the transcriptional regulator txtR was identified which is a member of the AraC/XylS protein family. The protein detects cellobiose and then causes changes in gene expression of the genes required for thaxtomin production, as well as the production of txtR. When txtR is silenced in the 87.22 strain, the expression of txtA, txtB and txtC decreases 40 fold resulting in a dramatic decrease in thaxtomin A production. TxtR is not the universal regulator of pathogenicity however as some nec1 and tomA are not affected by silencing it. It is thought that S. scabiei cannot degrade cellulose itself and that instead it detects cellobiose that leaks through plant cell walls at areas where the roots are actively growing.

The twin-arginine translocation pathway is an important pathway involved in virulence, which transports proteins through the cell membrane of the bacteria. Over 100 different proteins are thought to be transported by the pathway, some of which are required for virulence, but others just for normal growth.

=== Defense ===
Very little is known about the defense mechanisms that plants use against actinobacteria such as S. scabiei. When the model plant, Arabidopsis thaliana is challenged by S. scabiei or thaxtomin A it produces the antimicrobial phytoalexin called scopoletin, which is known to accumulate in tobacco when it is infected by pathogens. This leads to the bacteria growing more slowly and producing less thaxtomin A, thought to be linked to the repression of the nitric oxide synthase gene involved in its synthesis. Scopoletin has been detected in diseased potato tubers, but its role in the defense against S. scabiei is unknown. Other defense mechanisms have also been noted in A. thaliana to thaxtomin A, including the initiation of programmed cell death, an efflux of hydrogen ions and an influx of calcium ions.

=== Hosts ===
Streptomyces scabiei can infect many plants, but is most commonly encountered causing disease on tuber and tap root crops. It causes common scab on potato (Solanum tuberosum), beet (Beta vulgaris), carrot (Daucus carota), parsnip (Pastinaca sativa), radish (Raphanus sativus), rutabaga (Brassica napobrassica) and turnip (Brassica rapa). It also inhibits the growth of the seedlings of both monocot and dicot plants. Potato varieties differ in their susceptibility to S. scabiei. More resistant varieties tending to have fewer, tougher lenticels and a thicker skin, although authors do not agree on the specific characteristics required for resistance.
