= Streptomyces neyagawaensis =

Scientific classification
- Domain: Bacteria
- Kingdom: Bacillati
- Phylum: Actinomycetota
- Class: Actinomycetia
- Order: Streptomycetales
- Family: Streptomycetaceae
- Genus: Streptomyces
- Species: S. neyagawaensis

Binomial name
- Streptomyces neyagawaensis Yamamoto et al. 1960

Species of bacterium

Streptomyces neyagawaensis is an Actinomycetota species in the antibiotic producing genus Streptomyces.

S. neyagawaensis is known to produce the isoflavone orobol or the antifungal antibiotic folimycin.

== Taxonomy ==
In 1979 Elesawy and Szabo proposed Streptomyces neyagawaensis be assigned to the Diastatochromogenes cluster along with S. scabies, S. bottropensis, S. diastatochromogenes, S. eurythermus and S. griseosporeus, which was later confirmed by other authors based on morphological and genetic analyses.
