= Streptomyces phaeochromogenes =

Scientific classification
- Domain: Bacteria
- Kingdom: Bacillati
- Phylum: Actinomycetota
- Class: Actinomycetes
- Order: Streptomycetales
- Family: Streptomycetaceae
- Genus: Streptomyces
- Species: S. phaeochromogenes

Binomial name
- Streptomyces phaeochromogenes (Conn 1917) Waksman 1957 (Approved Lists 1980)

Type strain
- 288.60, 929.68, ARI 8505, AS 4.0613, ATCC 23945, ATCC 3338, BCRC 12484, BUCSAV 17, BUCSAV 17.4, BUCSAV 4, CBS 282.30, CBS 288.60, CBS 929.68, CCM 3193, CCRC 12484, CECT 3070, CGMCC 4.0613, CGMCC 4.1308, DSM 40073, DSM 40788, DSMZ 40073, ETH 14851, ETH 16838, ETH 20197, IAW 111, ICMP 483, IFM 1051, IFO 12898, IFO 3180, IMET 40355, IMRU 3338, ISP 5073, JCM 4070, JCM 4659, KCC S-0070, KCC S-0659, KCCS-0070, KCCS-0659, KCTC 9763, Lanoot R-8713, LMG 19348, NBRC 12898, NBRC 3180, NCIB 8505, NCIM 2504, NCIMB 8505, NRRL B-1248, NRRL B-1266, NRRL B-3010, NRRL-ISP 5073, R-8713, RIA 1119, RIA 61, VKM Ac-1002, VTT E-82160, WC 3338

Synonyms
- "Actinomyces pheochromogenus" Conn 1917; Streptomyces ederensis Wallhäusser et al. 1966 (Approved Lists 1980); "Streptomyces phaeochromogenus" [sic] (Conn 1917) Waksman and Henrici 1948; "Streptomyces pheochromogenus" [sic] (Conn 1917) Pridham et al. 1958

Species of bacterium

Streptomyces phaeochromogenes is a bacterium species from the genus of Streptomyces. Streptomyces phaeochromogenes produces tyrosinate, bromoperoxidase, ditryptophenalin, phaeochromycin A, phaeochromycin B, phaeochromycin C, phaeochromycin D and phaeochromycin E. Streptomyces phaeochromogenes also produces moenomycin and bambermycin.

== See also ==
- List of Streptomyces species
