= Streptomyces pococaldensis =

Scientific classification
- Domain: Bacteria
- Kingdom: Bacillati
- Phylum: Actinomycetota
- Class: Actinomycetes
- Order: Streptomycetales
- Family: Streptomycetaceae
- Genus: Streptomyces
- Species: S. pococaldensis

Binomial name
- Streptomyces pococaldensis Destefano et al. 2026

Type strain
- IBSBF 2435^{T} = CBMAI 2707^{T} = ICMP 24293^{T} = MUM 22.66^{T}

Species of bacterium

Streptomyces pococaldensis is a species of aerobic, Gram-positive actinomycete belonging to the genus Streptomyces. It was described in 2026 from a strain isolated from a potato tuber showing symptoms of potato scab in Poços de Caldas, Minas Gerais, Brazil.

== Description ==
Streptomyces pococaldensis produces branched substrate mycelium and aerial hyphae with spiral chains of spores. Colonies produce white aerial mycelium. The assembled genome of the type strain is approximately 7.7 Mb, with a DNA G+C content of 72.5%.

== Taxonomy ==
The species was characterized using morphological, physiological, multilocus sequence and genomic analyses. Its type strain is IBSBF 2435^{T}, also deposited as CBMAI 2707^{T}, ICMP 24293^{T} and MUM 22.66^{T}.

The specific epithet pococaldensis refers to Poços de Caldas, a municipality in Minas Gerais, Brazil, where the type strain originated.
