= Streptomyces shimoyamaii =

Scientific classification
- Domain: Bacteria
- Kingdom: Bacillati
- Phylum: Actinomycetota
- Class: Actinomycetes
- Order: Streptomycetales
- Family: Streptomycetaceae
- Genus: Streptomyces
- Species: S. shimoyamaii

Binomial name
- Streptomyces shimoyamaii Destefano et al. 2026

Type strain
- IBSBF 2507^{T} = CBMAI 2709^{T} = ICMP 24295^{T} = MUM 22.64^{T}

Species of bacterium

Streptomyces shimoyamaii is a species of aerobic, Gram-positive actinomycete belonging to the genus Streptomyces. It was described in 2026 from a strain isolated from a potato tuber showing symptoms of potato scab in Ibicoara, Bahia, Brazil.

== Description ==
Streptomyces shimoyamaii produces branched substrate mycelium and aerial hyphae with spiral chains of spores. Colonies produce gray-white aerial mycelium. The assembled genome of the type strain is approximately 8.9 Mb, with a DNA G+C content of 72.0%.

== Taxonomy ==
The species was characterized using morphological, physiological, multilocus sequence and genomic analyses. Its type strain is IBSBF 2507^{T}, also deposited as CBMAI 2709^{T}, ICMP 24295^{T} and MUM 22.64^{T}.

The specific epithet shimoyamaii honors Natalino Shimoyama for his contributions to the Brazilian potato sector.
