= Oley =

Oley may refer to:

People

- Barnabas Oley (1602–1686), English churchman and academic
- Johann Christoph Oley (1738–1789), German organist and composer

Places

- Oley Valley, Pennsylvania
- Oley Township, Berks County, Pennsylvania
- Oley, Pennsylvania, a census-designated place within this township

Other

- OleY, acronym for L-olivosyl-oleandolide 3-O-methyltransferase, an enzyme
- Oley, a car brand
