= RaiA-hairpin RNA motif =

Structure in some nucleic acids

raiA-hairpin
- Consensus secondary structure and sequence conservation of raiA-hairpin RNA

Identifiers
- Symbol: raiA-hairpin
- Rfam: RF03059

Other data
- RNA type: Gene; sRNA
- SO: SO:0001263
- PDB structures: PDBe

The raiA-hairpin RNA motif is a conserved RNA structure that was discovered by bioinformatics. raiA-hairpin motif RNAs are found in organism classified within the genus Streptomyces.

This motif is consistently located upstream of raiA genes, which encode a ribosome-binding protein that is involved in a bacterial stress response process. This association is shared with the raiA RNA motif. However, where the rai RNA motif exhibits a highly conserved and complex secondary structure, the raiA-hairpin's secondary structure consists of a simple hairpin.

The positioning of raiA-hairpin RNAs suggest that they function as cis-regulatory elements. However, the fact that the raiA motif is also located in such positions, and that it is unclear whether the raiA RNA motif functions in cis calls into question whether the raiA-hairpin RNA motif functions as a cis regulator.

There is also a possibility, based on computational predictions, that raiA-hairpin RNAs function as Rho-independent transcription termination hairpins. Such hairpins have less specific properties in Actinomycetota, such as Streptomyces. However, only some rai-hairpin RNAs are predicted as transcription termination hairpins.
