= Streptomyces hilarionis =

Scientific classification
- Domain: Bacteria
- Kingdom: Bacillati
- Phylum: Actinomycetota
- Class: Actinomycetia
- Order: Streptomycetales
- Family: Streptomycetaceae
- Genus: Streptomyces
- Species: S. hilarionis

Binomial name
- Streptomyces hilarionis Vitor et al. 2023

Species of bacterium

Streptomyces hilarionis is a species of aerobic Gram-positive actinomycete. It was discovered and characterized in Brazil, along with Streptomyces haiashii, where it has been associated with common scab, a disease that causes significant damage to potato crops worldwide. Its type strain is IBSBF 2807^{T} (other culture collections: CBMAI 2674^{T}=ICMP 24297^{T}=MUM 22.66^{T}).
