= Streptomyces brasiliscabiei =

Scientific classification
- Domain: Bacteria
- Kingdom: Bacillati
- Phylum: Actinomycetota
- Class: Actinomycetia
- Order: Streptomycetales
- Family: Streptomycetaceae
- Genus: Streptomyces
- Species: S. brasiliscabiei

Binomial name
- Streptomyces brasiliscabiei Correa et al. 2021

Species of bacterium

Streptomyces brasiliscabiei is a streptomycete bacterium species that is associated with common scab in potatoes characterized in Brazil. Its type strain is IBSBF 2867T (other culture collection: CBMAI 2394; ICMP 23759).
