= Santol =

Santol may refer to:

== Foods and other substances ==
- Santol (fruit), a tropical fruit
- An alternative name for orobol, an isoflavone
- A slang name for site enhancement oil, a substance used in bodybuilding

== Places ==
- Santol, La Union, a municipality in the Philippines
- Santol, a barangay of Quezon City in the Philippines
- Santol, Balagtas, a barangay of Balagtas, Bulacan in the Philippines

== Other uses ==
- Santol, a former canine ambassador at the Fairmont Le Château Frontenac in Québec City

== See also ==
- Santo (disambiguation)
