= Streptomyces hayashii =

Scientific classification
- Domain: Bacteria
- Kingdom: Bacillati
- Phylum: Actinomycetota
- Class: Actinomycetia
- Order: Streptomycetales
- Family: Streptomycetaceae
- Genus: Streptomyces
- Species: S. hayashii

Binomial name
- Streptomyces hayashii Vitor et al. 2023

Species of bacterium

Streptomyces hayashii is a species of aerobic Gram-positive actinomycete. It was recently discovered and characterized in Brazil, along with Streptomyces hilarionis, where it has been associated with common scab, a disease that causes significant damage to potato crops worldwide. The type strain is IBSBF 2953^{T}(other culture collections: CBMAI 2675^{T}=ICMP 24301^{T}=MUM 22.68^{T}).
