= 3-hydroxyanthranilate 4-C-methyltransferase =

Class of enzymes

Identifiers
- EC no.: 2.1.1.97
- CAS no.: 112445-22-4

Databases
- IntEnz: IntEnz view
- BRENDA: BRENDA entry
- ExPASy: NiceZyme view
- KEGG: KEGG entry
- MetaCyc: metabolic pathway
- PRIAM: profile
- PDB structures: RCSB PDB PDBe PDBsum
- Gene Ontology: AmiGO / QuickGO
Search
- PMC: articles
- PubMed: articles
- NCBI: proteins

3-hydroxyanthranilate 4-C-methyltransferase (EC 2.1.1.97) is an enzyme that catalyzes the chemical reaction

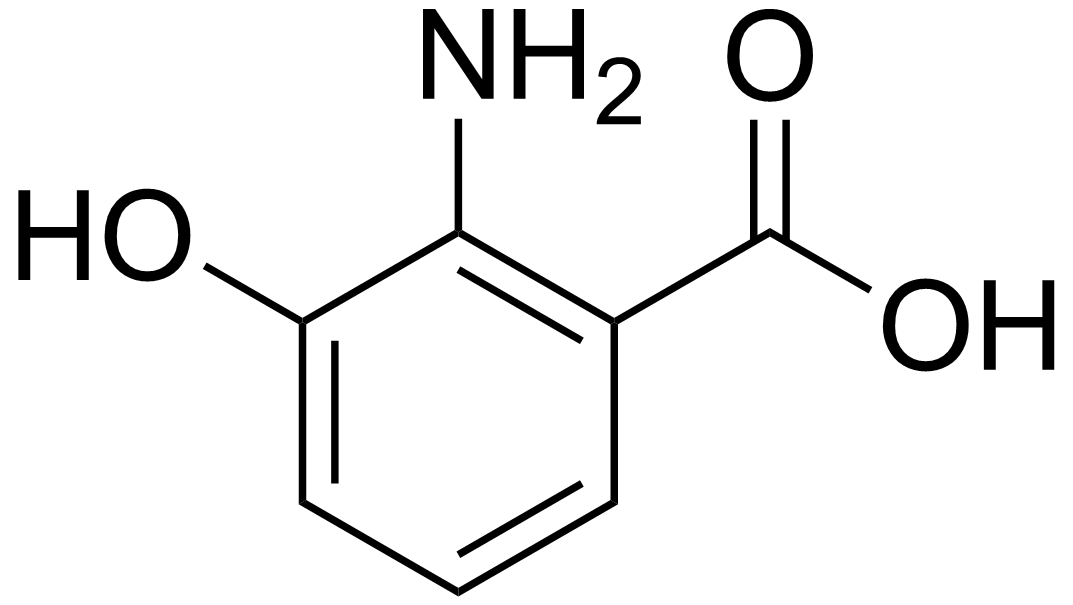
3-Hydroxyanthranilic acid
+ SAM
3-Hydroxy-4-methylanthranilic acid
+ SAH

This is a methylation reaction in which the 3-hydroxyanthranilic acid, is converted to 3-hydroxy-4-methylanthranilic acid. The methyl group comes from the cofactor, S-adenosyl methionine (SAM), which becomes S-adenosyl-L-homocysteine (SAH).

This enzyme belongs to the family of transferases, specifically those transferring one-carbon group methyltransferases. The systematic name of this enzyme class is S-adenosyl-L-methionine:3-hydroxyanthranilate 4-C-methyltransferase. This enzyme is also called 3-hydroxyanthranilate 4-methyltransferase. The reaction is part of the biosynthetic pathway to actinomycin in Streptomyces antibioticus
