= S. alboniger =

S. alboniger may refer to:

- Streptomyces alboniger, a bacterium species
- Spizaetus alboniger, a synonym for Nisaetus alboniger, the Blyth's hawk-eagle, a bird of prey species found in Peninsula Malaysia, Singapore, Sumatra and Borneo
