= Streptomyces stelliscabiei =

Scientific classification
- Domain: Bacteria
- Kingdom: Bacillati
- Phylum: Actinomycetota
- Class: Actinomycetia
- Order: Streptomycetales
- Family: Streptomycetaceae
- Genus: Streptomyces
- Species: S. stelliscabiei

Binomial name
- Streptomyces stelliscabiei Bouchek-Mechiche et al., 2000

Species of bacterium

Streptomyces stelliscabiei or is a streptomycete bacterium species that is associated with common scab in potatoes. Its type strain is CFBP 4521T.
