= Tartrolon =

Boron-containing chemical compound

Tartrolons are a group of boron-containing macrolide antibiotics discovered in 1994 from the culture broth of the myxobacterium Sorangium cellulosum. Two variants of tartrolons, A and B, were identified. Tartrolon B contains a boron atom, while tartrolon A does not.

== Discovery ==
In a study publishied in 1994, the producing organism, Sorangium cellulosum strain So ce 678, was isolated by a group of German scientists (Dietmar Schummer, Herbert Irschik, Hans Reichenbach, Gerhard Höfle) from a soil sample collected near Braunschweig in 1990, as antibiotics of the macrolide group. Synthesis was achieved by fermentation in the presence of the adsorber resin XAD-16. Adsorber resin is a type of synthetic polymer used to selectively extract and purify target molecules from solutions.

These findings were confirmed by a subsequent study, in 1995, where the strain was grown on a medium containing potato starch, yeast extract, defatted soja meal, glucose-H_{2}O, MgSO_{4}·7H_{2}O, CaCl_{2}-2H_{2}O and Na-Fe(III)-EDTA at pH 7.2.

To isolate greater quantities of tartrolons for research purposes or potential applications in medicine, the strain was cultivated in a bioreactor. Cultivation was started with an inoculum grown in Erlenmeyer flasks under shaking at 30°C with an aeration rate of 0.15 m^{3} air per hour and a stirrer speed of 150 RPM.

== Laboratory synthesis ==
The synthesis and regulation of tartrolons are influenced by the presence or absence of glass flasks during cultivation or by adding sodium tetraborate to the culture medium. When not exposed to glass or sodium tetraborate supplementation is absent, tartrolon A is predominantly produced; otherwise, tartrolon B becomes the main product.

== Biological properties ==
Tartrolons have been found to inhibit Gram-positive bacteria similar to other related boron-containing antibiotics like boromycin and aplasmomycin, as their boron binding regions are identical. Tartrolons also show toxicity towards mammalian cell cultures.

== Potential applications ==
The antimicrobial properties of tartrolons indicate they could be investigated as antibiotics to combat bacterial infections. The efficacy, safety, mechanism of action, and other potential medicinal uses of tartrolons are not yet established. Also unknown is whether they act through selectivity towards enzymes or through interference with energy delivery and membrane integrity, and whether they have any biological role beyond their antibiotic activity in nature.

One potential application of tartrolons is the study of species such as Listeria monocytogenes. Listeria monocytogenes is a bacterium that can cause the infectious disease known as listeriosis. It is a foodborne pathogen and poses a significant risk to human health. Listeriosis primarily affects individuals with weakened immune systems, pregnant women, newborns, and the elderly. Listeria monocytogenes is present in diverse habitats where tartrolons are found, which makes tartrolons a candidate for suppressing this and related pathogens. The antimicrobial properties exhibited by tartrolon B and its induction of the timABR locus, which contributes to resistance against tartrolons in Listeria monocytogenes, suggest their potential for antibacterial activities. The specific effectiveness and mechanisms involved in controlling Listeria monocytogenes with tartrolons are not yet determined. Studying tartrolons may clarify how pathogens like Listeria adapt to diverse habitats and survive within their ecological niches despite the presence of antimicrobial compounds produced by other microorganisms. Understanding these mechanisms could aid in developing strategies to control or prevent infections caused by Listeria or related pathogens. Besides the application in medicine, studying the interaction between Listeria monocytogenes and tartrolons may expose the broader ecological dynamics between bacteria in natural reservoirs such as soil and marine environments where both pathogenic and non-pathogenic species coexist. This knowledge can contribute to understanding of microbial ecology and can help design interventions to manage bacterial populations in agricultural settings or food production facilities where contamination with Listeria can occur.
