= Streptomyces sudanensis =

Scientific classification
- Domain: Bacteria
- Kingdom: Bacillati
- Phylum: Actinomycetota
- Class: Actinomycetia
- Order: Streptomycetales
- Family: Streptomycetaceae
- Genus: Streptomyces
- Species: S. sudanensis

Binomial name
- Streptomyces sudanensis Quintana et al. 2008

Type strain
- DSM 41923, NRRL B-24575, SD 504

Species of bacterium

Streptomyces sudanensis is a bacterium species from the genus of Streptomyces which has been isolated from patients with actinomycosis infections in Sudan.

== See also ==
- List of Streptomyces species
