= Streptomyces reticuliscabiei =

Scientific classification
- Domain: Bacteria
- Kingdom: Bacillati
- Phylum: Actinomycetota
- Class: Actinomycetia
- Order: Streptomycetales
- Family: Streptomycetaceae
- Genus: Streptomyces
- Species: S. reticuliscabiei

Binomial name
- Streptomyces reticuliscabiei Bouchek-Mechiche et al., 2000

Species of bacterium

Streptomyces reticuliscabiei is a streptomycete bacterium species that is associated with netted scab in potatoes. Its type strain is CFBP 4517T (= ATCC 49173T). It is considered to be part of a cluster together with S. turgidiscabies, however they cause different diseases, the former involved in common scab.
