= Legonmycin =

Group of chemical compounds

- Legonmycin A (top) and legonmycin B

Names
- IUPAC names A: N-(8-Hydroxy-2-methyl-1-oxo-6,7-dihydro-5H-pyrrolizin-3-yl)-3-methylbutanamide; B: N-(8-Hydroxy-2-methyl-1-oxo-6,7-dihydro-5H-pyrrolizin-3-yl)-4-methylpentanamide

Identifiers
CAS Number	A: 1802522-27-5; B: 1802522-28-6
3D model (JSmol)	A: Interactive image; B: Interactive image
ChemSpider	A: 40257825
PubChem CID	A: 139585189; B: 156583135
- InChI: A: InChI=1S/C13H20N2O3/c1-8(2)7-10(16)14-12-9(3)11(17)13(18)5-4-6-15(12)13/h8,18H,4-7H2,1-3H3,(H,14,16) Key: PLSCDSCQUZWYJL-UHFFFAOYSA-N; B: InChI=1S/C14H22N2O3/c1-9(2)5-6-11(17)15-13-10(3)12(18)14(19)7-4-8-16(13)14/h9,19H,4-8H2,1-3H3,(H,15,17) Key: STVITZBETCSTPL-UHFFFAOYSA-N
- SMILES: A: CC1=C(N2CCCC2(C1=O)O)NC(=O)CC(C)C; B: CC1=C(N2CCCC2(C1=O)O)NC(=O)CCC(C)C

Properties
Chemical formula	A: C_{13}H_{20}N_{2}O_{3} B: C_{14}H_{22}N_{2}O_{3}
- Except where otherwise noted, data are given for materials in their standard state (at 25 °C [77 °F], 100 kPa). Infobox references

Legonmycins are a group of chemical compounds that belong to the pyrrolizidine family of naturally occurring alkaloids. Discovered by a joint team of researchers from University of Ghana, University of Aberdeen, and Wuhan University, the compounds were isolated from Streptomyces microorganisms in Legon, a suburb of Accra, Ghana. Laboratory syntheses of legonmycin A and legonmycin B have been reported.
