= Streptomyces viridosporus =

Scientific classification
- Domain: Bacteria
- Kingdom: Bacillati
- Phylum: Actinomycetota
- Class: Actinomycetes
- Order: Streptomycetales
- Family: Streptomycetaceae
- Genus: Streptomyces
- Species: S. viridosporus

Binomial name
- Streptomyces viridosporus Pridham et al. 1958

Type strain
- ATCC 27479, BCRC 11870, CBS 654.72, CCRC 11870, CCUG 37512, CGMCC 4.1770, CIP 108230, DSM 40243, IFO 13353, IMET 43514, ISP 5243, JCM 4859, KCC S-0859, KCCS-0859, KCTC 9145, LMG 20278, NBRC 13353, NCIMB 9824, NRRL 2414, NRRL B-2414, NRRL-ISP 5243, Parke Davis & Co.04889, PD 04889, RIA 1314, VKM Ac-1769, VKM Ac-618

Synonyms
- Streptomyces ghanaensis Wallhäusser et al. 1966 (Approved Lists 1980)

Species of bacterium

Streptomyces viridosporus is a bacterium species from the genus of Streptomyces. Streptomyces viridosporus produces sistomycine and lignin peroxidase. Streptomyces viridosporus can degrade lignin and humic acids. Streptomyces viridosporus also produces moenomycin A, a component of bambermycin.

== See also ==
- List of Streptomyces species
