= Leinamycin =

Names
- IUPAC name (2R,4′R,6R,9E,11R,13E,15Z)-4′,11-Dihydroxy-2,4′,9-trimethyl-1′-oxospiro[19-thia-3,20-diazabicyclo[15.2.1]icosa-1(20),9,13,15,17-pentaene-6,5′-dithiolane]-3′,4,12-trione
- Other names Streptomyces antibiotic DC-107

Identifiers
| CAS Number | 120500-15-4 |
| 3D model (JSmol) | Interactive image |
| ChEBI | CHEBI:80015 |
| ChemSpider | 8024943 |
| KEGG | C15677 |
| PubChem CID | 9849230 |
- InChI: InChI=1S/C22H26N2O6S3/c1-13-8-9-22(21(3,29)20(28)32-33(22)30)11-18(27)23-14(2)19-24-15(12-31-19)6-4-5-7-16(25)17(26)10-13/h4-7,10,12,14,17,26,29H,8-9,11H2,1-3H3,(H,23,27)/b6-4-,7-5+,13-10+/t14-,17-,21+,22-,33?/m1/s1 Key: ZHTRILQJTPJGNK-FYBAATNNSA-N
- SMILES: C[C@H]1NC(=O)C[C@@]2(CC\C(C)=C\[C@@H](O)C(=O)\C=C\C=C/c3csc1n3)S(=O)SC(=O)[C@]2(C)O

Properties
| Chemical formula | C_{22}H_{26}N_{2}O_{6}S_{3} |
| Molar mass | 510.64 g·mol^{−1} |
- Except where otherwise noted, data are given for materials in their standard state (at 25 °C [77 °F], 100 kPa). Infobox references

Leinamycin is an 18-membered macrolactam produced by several species of Streptomyces atroolivaceus. This macrolactam has also been shown to exhibit antitumor properties as well as antimicrobial properties against gram-positive and gram-negative bacteria. The presence of a spiro-fused 1,3-dioxo-1,2-dithiolane moiety was a unique structural property at the time of this compound's discovery and it plays an important role in leinamycin's antitumor and antibacterial properties due to its ability to inhibit DNA synthesis.

== Biosynthesis ==
The seminal proposal for the biosynthesis of leinamycin was published in Chemistry & Biochemistry in 2004. This biosynthesis consists of a discrete and modular NRPS, AT-less PKSs, and PKS modules. NRPS-PKS assembly line dictates the loading of D-Ala to initiate biosynthesis, followed by the loading of L-Cys to the peptidyl carrier protein (PCP). The dipeptide is then cyclized and oxidized to form the thiazonyl-S-PCP intermediate. The thiazonyl intermediate is then transferred to the PKS assembly line where the backbone is elongated by six units. The leinamycin hybrid peptide-polyketide carbon backbone intermediate is then cyclized by the thioesterase domain (TE) to yield intermediate 1. Methylmalonyl-CoA then condenses at the beta-keto group of 1, yielding 2. A series of tailoring enzymes converts 2 to 4, presumably through intermediate 3 to complete the biosynthesis of leinamycin.
