= Vulgamycin =

Names
- Preferred IUPAC name (3R,4aR,5S,6S,7S,7aS,8Ξ)-7-Benzoyl-4a,6,7a,8-tetrahydroxy-5-(4-methoxy-6-oxo-6H-pyran-2-yl)hexahydro-3,6-methanocyclopenta[c]pyran-1(3H)-one

Identifiers
CAS Number	59678-46-5
3D model (JSmol)	Interactive image
ChemSpider	65321521
PubChem CID	115182
UNII	2M8WGY5QPQ
CompTox Dashboard (EPA)	DTXSID10975078
- InChI: InChI=1S/C22H20O10/c1-30-11-7-12(31-14(23)8-11)16-20(27)9-13-18(25)21(16,28)17(22(20,29)19(26)32-13)15(24)10-5-3-2-4-6-10/h2-8,13,16-18,25,27-29H,9H2,1H3/t13-,16-,17+,18?,20-,21+,22-/m1/s1 Key: CTBBEXWJRAPJIZ-VKMWXFLYSA-N
- SMILES: COC1=CC(=O)OC(=C1)[C@@H]2[C@@]3(C[C@@H]4C([C@]2([C@@H]([C@]3(C(=O)O4)O)C(=O)C5=CC=CC=C5)O)O)O

Properties
Chemical formula	C_{22}H_{20}O_{10}
Molar mass	444.392 g·mol^{−1}
- Except where otherwise noted, data are given for materials in their standard state (at 25 °C [77 °F], 100 kPa). Infobox references

Vulgamycin is an antibiotic made by Streptomyces.
