= L-olivosyl-oleandolide 3-O-methyltransferase =

Identifiers
- EC no.: 2.1.1.239

Databases
- IntEnz: IntEnz view
- BRENDA: BRENDA entry
- ExPASy: NiceZyme view
- KEGG: KEGG entry
- MetaCyc: metabolic pathway
- PRIAM: profile
- PDB structures: RCSB PDB PDBe PDBsum
Search
- PMC: articles
- PubMed: articles
- NCBI: proteins

L-olivosyl-oleandolide 3-O-methyltransferase (EC 2.1.1.239, OleY) is an enzyme with systematic name S-adenosyl-L-methionine:L-olivosyl-oleandolide B 3-O-methyltransferase. This enzyme catalyses the following chemical reaction

S-adenosyl-L-methionine + L-olivosyl-oleandolide $\rightleftharpoons$ S-adenosyl-L-homocysteine + L-oleandrosyl-oleandolide

The enzyme is involved in the biosynthesis of the macrolide antibiotic oleandomycin in Streptomyces antibioticus.
