= Streptomyces atroolivaceus =

Scientific classification
- Domain: Bacteria
- Kingdom: Bacillati
- Phylum: Actinomycetota
- Class: Actinomycetes
- Order: Streptomycetales
- Family: Streptomycetaceae
- Genus: Streptomyces
- Species: S. atroolivaceus

Binomial name
- Streptomyces atroolivaceus (Preobrazhenskaya et al. 1957) Pridham et al. 1958 (Approved Lists 1980)

Type strain
- AS 4.1582, ATCC 51343, CGMCC 4.1248, DSM 41649, IAM 15281, IFO 14327, JCM 3337, K55-G-32, NBRC 14327, NRRL B-16502, NRRL B-24282, VKM Ac-2005

Synonyms Streptomyces olivoviridis
- Actinomyces atroolivaceus

Species of bacterium

Streptomyces atroolivaceus is a bacterium species from the genus Streptomyces which has been isolated from soil in Russia. Streptomyces atroolivaceus produces leinamycin, mithramycin and chromocyclomycin.

== See also ==
- List of Streptomyces species
