= Potato scab =

Potato scab can refer to either:

- Common scab caused by various species of Streptomyces bacteria
- Powdery scab caused by the cercozoan Spongospora subterranea
