= Streptomyces niveiscabiei =

Scientific classification
- Domain: Bacteria
- Kingdom: Bacillati
- Phylum: Actinomycetota
- Class: Actinomycetia
- Order: Streptomycetales
- Family: Streptomycetaceae
- Genus: Streptomyces
- Species: S. niveiscabiei

Binomial name
- Streptomyces niveiscabiei Park et al. 2003

Species of bacterium

Streptomyces niveiscabiei is a streptomycete bacterium species known to cause potato common scab disease in Korea. Its type strain is S78^{T} (=LMG 21392^{T} =KACC 20254^{T}). It has white, smooth, cylindrical spores that are borne in simple rectus flexuous spore-chains.
