= Mensacarcin =

Highly oxygenated polyketide

Mensacarcin is a highly oxygenated polyketide first isolated from soil-dwelling Streptomyces bottropensis bacteria.

The molecule is a secondary metabolite, and can be obtained in large amounts from its producing organism.

Due to its unique properties it is an important model for drug development against melanoma and other cancers.

== Medical properties ==
In NCI-60 anti-cancer compound screening mensacarcin has a high cytostatic effect against almost all cell lines (mean of 50% growth inhibition) and a relatively selective cytotoxic effect against melanoma cells.

Low COMPARE correlation with standard antitumor agents indicate a unique mechanism of action. Further examinations reveal mensacarcin effecting the mitochondria.

=== Potential use in cancer therapy ===
With its unique mechanism, effective also in BRAF V600E mutation cell lines, mensacarcin is a promising model for the development of new anticancer drugs.

Existing therapies for melanoma are limited. Mensacarcin's powerful effect against melanoma cells make it especially valuable for this disease.

== Mechanism of action ==
=== Specific disruption of mitochondrial function ===
Mitochondria provide most of the energy used by eukaryotic cells.

In a study at the Oregon State University a synthesized fluorescent probe of mensacarcin was localized to the mitochondria within 20 minutes of treatment.

Live-cell bioenergetic flux analysis showed rapid disturbance of energy production and of mitochondrial function.

The localization together with the metabolic effects provide evidence that mensacarcin targets mitochondria.

=== Induction of cell death ===
Mitochondria are also important in cell death signaling.

Mensacarcin in melanoma cells activates apoptotic pathways related to caspase 3 and caspase 7, and thus induces cell death.

After mensacarcin treatment of two melanoma cell lines, the cells showed characteristic chromatin condensation as well as distinct poly(ADP-ribose)polymerase-1 cleavage; flow cytometry identified a large population of apoptotic cells; single-cell electrophoresis indicated that mensacarcin causes genetic instability, a sign of early apoptosis.

=== Effect in melanoma cell lines with BRAF V600E mutation ===
The BRAF V600E mutation is associated with drug resistance. Due to its independent mechanism, mensacarcin has an undiminished effect in melanoma cell lines with this mutation (NCI 60 cell lines SK-Mel-28 and SK-Mel-5).
