= Streptomyces violaceusniger =

Scientific classification
- Domain: Bacteria
- Kingdom: Bacillati
- Phylum: Actinomycetota
- Class: Actinomycetes
- Order: Streptomycetales
- Family: Streptomycetaceae
- Genus: Streptomyces
- Species: S. violaceusniger

Binomial name
- Streptomyces violaceusniger Pridham et al. 1958

Type strain
- AS 4.1423, ATCC 27477, BCRC 15178, CBS 760.72, CCRC 15178, CGMCC 4.1423, DSM 40563, DSM 41600, ETH 14321, ETH 28358, ICMP 734, IFO 13459, ISP 5563, JCM 4850, KCC S-0850, Lanoot R-8700, LMG 19336, NBRC 13459, NRRL B-1476, NRRL B-1478, NRRL-ISP 5563, NZRCC 10344, R-8700, RGB A-975, RIA 1420, VKM Ac-583

Synonyms
- Actinomyces violaceus-niger Streptomyces violaceo-niger

Species of bacterium

Streptomyces violaceusniger is a bacterium species from the genus of Streptomyces. Streptomyces violaceusniger has antifungal activity. Streptomyces violaceusniger produces isoafricanol and spirofungin.

== See also ==
- List of Streptomyces species
