= Boromycin =

Chemical compound

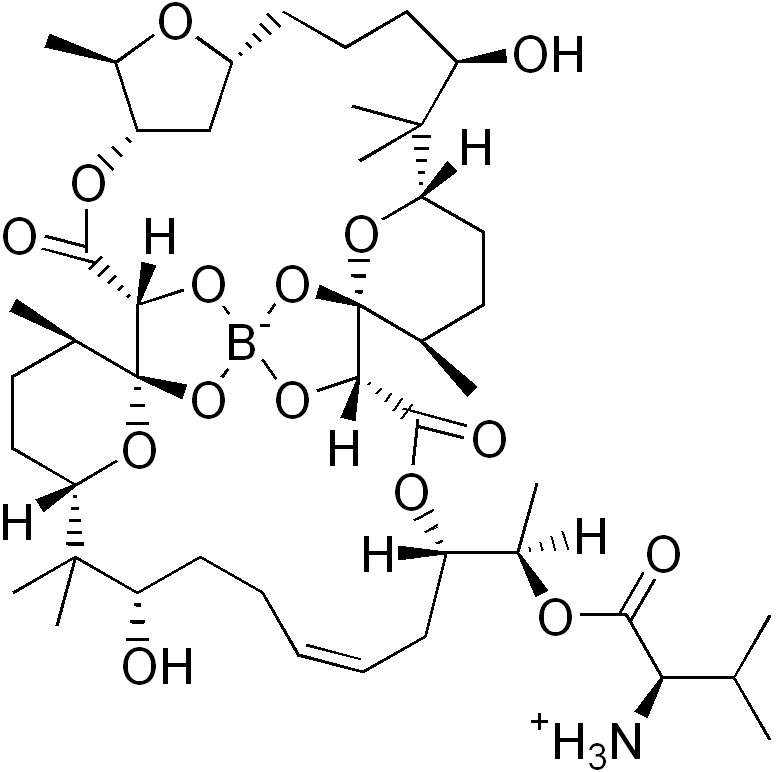

Clinical data
- ATC code: none

Identifiers
- IUPAC name: [(2R)-1-[(1R)-1-[(1R,5S,7E,11S,13S,16R,17R,24S,25R,27R,31R,33S,36R)-11,31-dihydroxy-12,12,16,25,32,32,36-heptamethyl-3,22-dioxo-4,18,20,23,26,37,38,40,41-nonaoxa-19-boranuidaheptacyclo[17.17.1.1^{1,33}.1^{2,19}.1^{13,17}.1^{24,27}.0^{17,21}]hentetracont-7-en-5-yl]ethoxy]-3-methyl-1-oxobutan-2-yl]azanium
- CAS Number: 34524-20-4
- PubChem CID: 6436027
- ChemSpider: 16735705
- UNII: 49559OZO07
- ChEBI: CHEBI:77880
- CompTox Dashboard (EPA): DTXSID10896996

Chemical and physical data
- Formula: C_{45}H_{74}BNO_{15}
- Molar mass: 879.89 g·mol^{−1}
- 3D model (JSmol): Interactive image
- SMILES: CC(C)C([NH3+])C(=O)O[C@H](C)[C@H]7OC(=O)C4O[B-]25O[C@@H](C(=O)O[C@H]1C[C@H](O[C@@H]1C)CCC[C@@H](O)C(C)(C)[C@@H]3CC[C@@H](C)[C@@]4(O2)O3)[C@]6(O5)O[C@@H](CC[C@H]6C)C(C)(C)[C@@H](O)CC\C=C/C7
- InChI: InChI=1S/C45H73BNO15/c1-24(2)36(47)39(50)54-27(5)30-16-12-11-13-17-32(48)42(7,8)34-21-19-26(4)45(57-34)38-41(52)56-31-23-29(53-28(31)6)15-14-18-33(49)43(9,10)35-22-20-25(3)44(58-35)37(40(51)55-30)59-46(60-38,61-44)62-45/h11-12,24-38,48-49H,13-23,47H2,1-10H3/q-1/p+1/b12-11-/t25-,26-,27-,28-,29-,30+,31+,32+,33-,34+,35+,36?,37?,38+,44+,45+,46?/m1/s1; Key:OOBFYEMEQCZLJL-WIHWYPJVSA-O

Boromycin is a bacteriocidal polyether-macrolide antibiotic. It was initially isolated from the Streptomyces antibioticus, and is notable for being the first natural product found to contain the element boron. It is effective against most gram-positive bacteria, but is ineffective against gram-negative bacteria. Boromycin kills bacteria by negatively affecting the cytoplasmic membrane, resulting in the loss of potassium ions from the cell. Boromycin has not been approved as a drug for medical use.

== Discovery ==
Boromycin was discovered by the scholars of the Institute for Special Botany and Organic Chemical Laboratories at the Swiss Federal Institute of Technology, Zurich, Switzerland, who, in 1967, published a study in as an article called "Metabolic products of microorganisms" in the Helvetica Chimica Acta journal. In this article, the authors described that a new strain of Streptomyces antibioticus produces a novel antibiotic which was the first boron-containing organic compound found in nature. The authors called this new compound boromycin and characterized it as a complex of boric acid with a tetradentate organic complexing agent that yields by hydrolysis D-valine, boric acid, and a polyhydroxy compound of macrolide type.

== General information ==
Boromycin has potential medical uses as an antibiotic for treating Gram-positive bacterial infections, coccidiosis, and certain protozoal infections, but its efficacy and safety in clinical settings were not determined. Boromycin has not been approved as a drug for medical use in the USA (by the FDA), Europe, Canada, Japan, Russia, China, or the former Soviet Union.

Boromycin is a boron-containing compound produced by Streptomyces antibioticus, isolated from the soil of Ivory Coast. It exhibits antimicrobial properties, inhibiting the growth of gram-positive bacteria while having no effect on certain gram-negative bacteria and fungi. Boromycin has also shown activity against protozoa of the genera Plasmodium and Babesia.

In addition to its antimicrobial effects, boromycin has been studied to treat and prevent coccidiosis in susceptible poultry. It has been predicted to inhibit the replication of HIV-1 and the synthesis of proteins, RNA, and DNA in whole cells of Bacillus subtilis. Boromycin binds to the cytoplasmic membrane within the cell and is antagonized by surface-active compounds. It is bound to lipoprotein and does not influence the K+, Na+-ATPase of the cytoplasmic membrane.

The removal of boric acid from the boromycin molecule leads to a loss of antibiotic activity. There are minor products of boromycin fermentation, differing in the acylation position. Experiments with feeding the production strain Sorangium cellulosum with specific isotopes have clarified the biosynthesis of tartrolons, which are closely related to boromycin and aplasmomycin.

== Research ==
Boron, the essential trace element found in boromycin, benefits plants, animals, and humans. Boron-containing compounds such as boromycin have been studied for potential medicinal applications.

Researchers are exploring the incorporation of boron into biologically active molecules, including for boron neutron capture therapy of brain tumors. The role of the boron atom in neutron capture therapy for malignant brain tumors is to target tumor cells selectively. When a non-radioactive boron isotope (^{10}B) is administered and accumulates in tumor cells, these cells can be selectively destroyed when irradiated with low-energy thermal neutrons. The collision of neutrons with ^{10}B releases high linear energy transfer particles, such as α-particles and lithium-7 nuclei, which can selectively destroy the tumor cells while sparing surrounding normal cells.

Some boron-containing biomolecules may also act as signaling molecules interacting with cell surfaces.

=== Anti-HIV activity ===
A 1996 study suggests that boromycin has anti-HIV activity in laboratory experiments (in vitro). In that study, boromycin inhibited the replication of both clinically isolated HIV-1 strains and cultured strains. The mechanism of action was believed to involve blocking the later stage of HIV infection, specifically the maturity step for replication of the HIV molecule.

While the study provides promising results in a controlled laboratory setting, in vitro experiments do not always accurately predict the effectiveness of a compound in living organisms. Strong evidence should be accumulated to determine boromycin's actual in vivo anti-HIV activity in a living human organism. Accumulating such evidence typically involves preclinical studies in animal models to assess safety, efficacy, and pharmacokinetics before progressing to clinical trials in humans.

The lack of replication of the 1996 study's findings by other studies suggests a lack of confirmation regarding the anti-HIV activity of boromycin. This could be due to potential methodological limitations in the original study, such as variations in experimental conditions or difficulties in isolating and purifying boromycin. It is also possible that the initial study produced a false positive result, where the observed anti-HIV activity resulted from chance or experimental artifacts rather than a true effect. Additionally, publication bias may play a role, as positive or novel findings are more likely to be published, potentially leading to an incomplete picture of the overall research on boromycin's anti-HIV activity. Studies are needed to address these factors and determine the true effectiveness of boromycin as an in vivo anti-HIV agent.

=== Anti-plasmodium activity ===
In a 2021 study, boromycin showed activity against Plasmodium falciparum and Plasmodium knowlesi, two species of malaria parasites. It demonstrated rapid killing of asexual stages of both species, including multidrug-resistant strains, at low concentrations. Additionally, boromycin exhibited activity against Plasmodium falciparum stage V gametocytes. However, other studies have not confirmed these results, so the efficacy of boromycin as an antimalarial agent remains unconfirmed and these findings should be interpreted cautiously.

=== Activity against intracellular protozoal parasites ===
A 2021 study by scholars from Central Luzon State University, Philippines, and Washington State University, USA, showed the activity of boromycin against Toxoplasma gondii and Cryptosporidium parvum, which are intracellular protozoal parasites affecting humans and animals. The study found that boromycin effectively inhibited the intracellular proliferation of both parasites at low concentrations. However, these preliminary results have not yet been confirmed by further studies. To validate the results and understand the potential of boromycin as a therapeutic option for the treatment of toxoplasmosis and cryptosporidiosis, it is critical to conduct studies to confirm the activity of boromycin against intracellular protozoan parasites in living host organisms.
