= Phaeochromycin A =

Names
- Preferred IUPAC name 6-(4,5-Dihydroxy-2-propylnaphthalen-1-yl)-4-hydroxy-2H-pyran-2-one

Identifiers
CAS Number	865795-52-4
3D model (JSmol)	Interactive image
ChEMBL	ChEMBL487190
ChemSpider	10217085
PubChem CID	54694607
CompTox Dashboard (EPA)	DTXSID201043601
- InChI: InChI=1S/C18H16O5/c1-2-4-10-7-14(21)18-12(5-3-6-13(18)20)17(10)15-8-11(19)9-16(22)23-15/h3,5-9,19-21H,2,4H2,1H3 Key: XGGZRXUATHGLQU-UHFFFAOYSA-N
- SMILES: CCCc1cc(c2c(c1c3cc(cc(=O)o3)O)cccc2O)O

Properties
Chemical formula	C_{18}H_{16}O_{5}
Molar mass	312.321 g·mol^{−1}
- Except where otherwise noted, data are given for materials in their standard state (at 25 °C [77 °F], 100 kPa). Infobox references

Phaeochromycin A is an anti-inflammatory polyketide isolated from Streptomyces.
