= Streptomyces acidiscabies =

Scientific classification
- Domain: Bacteria
- Kingdom: Bacillati
- Phylum: Actinomycetota
- Class: Actinomycetia
- Order: Streptomycetales
- Family: Streptomycetaceae
- Genus: Streptomyces
- Species: S. acidiscabies

Binomial name
- Streptomyces acidiscabies Lambert and Loria 1989

Species of bacterium

Streptomyces acidiscabies is a streptomycete bacterium species, causing a scab disease of potatoes. Its type strain is RL-110 (= ATCC 49003).
