= Streptomyces turgidiscabies =

Scientific classification
- Domain: Bacteria
- Kingdom: Bacillati
- Phylum: Actinomycetota
- Class: Actinomycetia
- Order: Streptomycetales
- Family: Streptomycetaceae
- Genus: Streptomyces
- Species: S. turgidiscabies

Binomial name
- Streptomyces turgidiscabies Miyajima et al. 1998

Species of bacterium

Streptomyces turgidiscabies is a streptomycete bacterium species, causing scab in potatoes. It has flexuous spore, the latter which are cylindrical and smooth. The type strain is SY9113^{T} (= ATCC 700248^{T} = IFO 16080^{T}). It is almost identical to Streptomyces reticuliscabiei; however, they are considered distinct species given the diseases they cause are different.
