= Orobol =

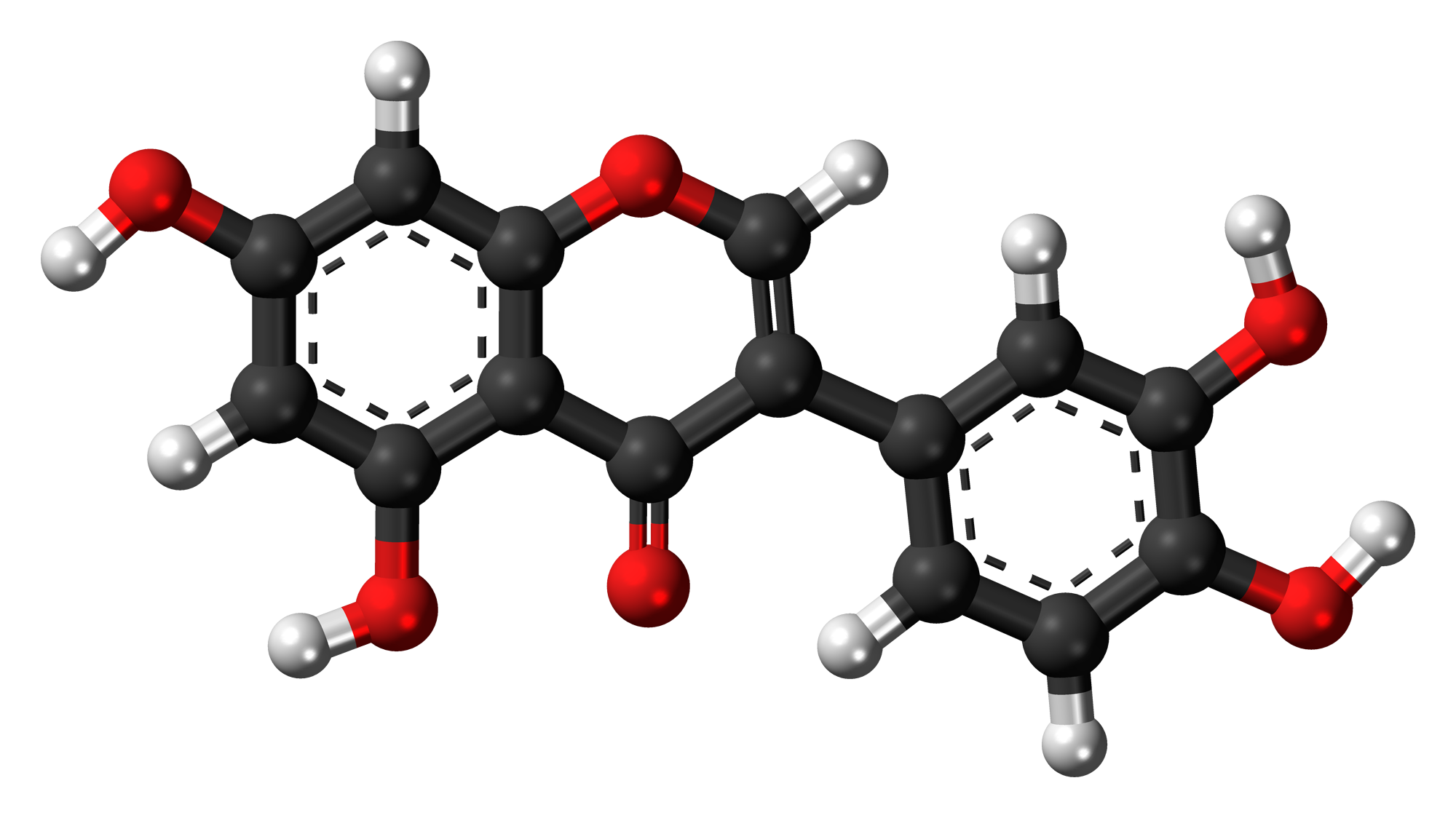

Names
- IUPAC name 3′,4′,5,7-Tetrahydroxyisoflavone
- Systematic IUPAC name 3-(3,4-Dihydroxyphenyl)-5,7-dihydroxy-4H-1-benzopyran-4-one
- Other names Isoluteolin; Santol; 5,7,3',4'-Tetrahydroxyisoflavone

Identifiers
CAS Number	480-23-9
3D model (JSmol)	Interactive image
Beilstein Reference	292790
ChEBI	CHEBI:69437
ChemSpider	4445113
MeSH	D011794
PubChem CID	5281801
UNII	LU8UZM1T51
CompTox Dashboard (EPA)	DTXSID20197380
- InChI: InChI=1S/C15H10O6/c16-8-4-12(19)14-13(5-8)21-6-9(15(14)20)7-1-2-10(17)11(18)3-7/h1-6,16-19H Key: IOYHCQBYQJQBSK-UHFFFAOYSA-N; InChI=1/C15H10O6/c16-8-4-12(19)14-13(5-8)21-6-9(15(14)20)7-1-2-10(17)11(18)3-7/h1-6,16-19H Key: IOYHCQBYQJQBSK-UHFFFAOYAR
- SMILES: C1=CC(=C(C=C1C2=COC3=CC(=CC(=C3C2=O)O)O)O)O

Properties
Chemical formula	C_{15}H_{10}O_{6}
Molar mass	286.23 g/mol
- Except where otherwise noted, data are given for materials in their standard state (at 25 °C [77 °F], 100 kPa). verify (what is ?) Infobox references

Orobol is one of several known isoflavones. It can be isolated from Aspergillus niger or Streptomyces neyagawaensis. It is a potent inhibitor of Phosphoinositide 3-kinase.
