= Streptomyces alboniger =

Scientific classification
- Domain: Bacteria
- Kingdom: Bacillati
- Phylum: Actinomycetota
- Class: Actinomycetia
- Order: Streptomycetales
- Family: Streptomycetaceae
- Genus: Streptomyces
- Species: S. alboniger

Binomial name
- Streptomyces alboniger Porter et al. 1952 (Approved Lists 1980)

Species of bacterium

Streptomyces alboniger is a bacterium species in the genus Streptomyces.

Streptomyces alboniger produces puromycin, a type of antibiotic.

== See also ==
- List of Streptomyces species
