= Streptomyces eurythermus =

Scientific classification
- Domain: Bacteria
- Kingdom: Bacillati
- Phylum: Actinomycetota
- Class: Actinomycetes
- Order: Streptomycetales
- Family: Streptomycetaceae
- Genus: Streptomyces
- Species: S. eurythermus

Binomial name
- Streptomyces eurythermus Corbaz et al. 1957

Type strain
- AS 4.1697, ATCC 14975, ATCC 19749, BCRC 13650, CBS 488.68, CCRC 13650, CGMCC 4.1697, DSM 40014, ETH 6677, ETH 6905, ETH 7489, IFO 12764, IMET 43078, ISP 5014, JCM 4206, JCM 4575, KACC 20129, KCC S-0575, KCCM 12267, KCTC 9731, NBRC 12764, NRRL 2539, NRRL-ISP 5014, RIA 1030, VKM Ac-1729

Species of bacterium

Streptomyces eurythermus is a bacterium species from the genus of Streptomyces which has been isolated from soil from Cuanza in Angola. Streptomyces eurythermus produces pentenomycin I, pentenomycin II and angolamycin.

== See also ==
- List of Streptomyces species
