= RaiA RNA motif =

Structure in nucleic acids

raiA
- Consensus secondary structure and sequence conservation of raiA RNA

Identifiers
- Symbol: raiA
- Rfam: RF03072

Other data
- RNA type: Cis-reg; Riboswitch
- SO: SO:0000035
- PDB structures: PDBe

The raiA RNA motif is a conserved RNA structure that was discovered by bioinformatics. raiA motif RNAs are found in Actinomycetota and Bacillota, and have many conserved features—including conserved nucleotide positions, conserved secondary structures and associated protein-coding genes—in both of these phyla. Some conserved features of the raiA RNA motif suggest that they function as cis-regulatory elements, but other aspects of the motif suggest otherwise.

raiA RNAs usually occur upstream of protein-coding genes. Although this association could suggest a cis-regulatory function, the raiA RNAs are fairly often located unusually far (more than 600 bp) from the genes compared to typical cis-regulatory RNAs. Moreover, although most raiA RNAs are located upstream of protein-coding genes, many are not.

In both Bacillota and Actinomycetota, raiA RNAs commonly occur upstream of genes encoding RaiA, a protein that binds to the ribosome as part of a stress response, and upstream of genes encoding periplasmic-binding proteins, which are transporters of unknown specificity. Also in both Bacillota and Actinomycetota, raiA RNAs commonly occur downstream of genes encoding ComFC domains, although not necessarily immediately downstream of such genes. ComFC domains likely function as part of genetic natural competence. The RNA's association with an upstream gene is highly unusual for bacterial cis-regulatory elements. Although some bacterial regulatory elements reside in the 3′ untranslated regions of genes, such elements have no association with downstream genes.

Therefore, it is unclear whether raiA are cis-regulatory or not. ely that raiA motif RNAs regulate expression of the upstream ORF. However, because of the motif's complex secondary structure and highly conserved nucleotide positions, it was proposed that the motif could be a riboswitch, if it is indeed cis regulatory.
