= Streptomyces griseosporeus =

Scientific classification
- Domain: Bacteria
- Kingdom: Bacillati
- Phylum: Actinomycetota
- Class: Actinomycetia
- Order: Streptomycetales
- Family: Streptomycetaceae
- Genus: Streptomyces
- Species: S. griseosporeus

Binomial name
- Streptomyces griseosporeus Niida and Ogasawara 1960

Type strain
- ATCC 27435, B-793, BCRC 15195, CBS 759.72, CCRC 15195, DSM 40562, HAMBI 1009, IFO 13458, IMET 43543, ISP 5562, JCM 4766, Meiji B-793, MS-1104, NBRC 13458, NRRL B-12498, NRRL-ISP 5562, RIA 1419, VKM Ac-1731

Species of bacterium

Streptomyces griseosporeus is a bacterium species from the genus of Streptomyces. Streptomyces griseosporeus produces taitomycin, 2-amino-4-hydroxypentanonic acid and liposidomycins.

== See also ==
- List of Streptomyces species
