= Bambermycin =

Antibiotic mixture

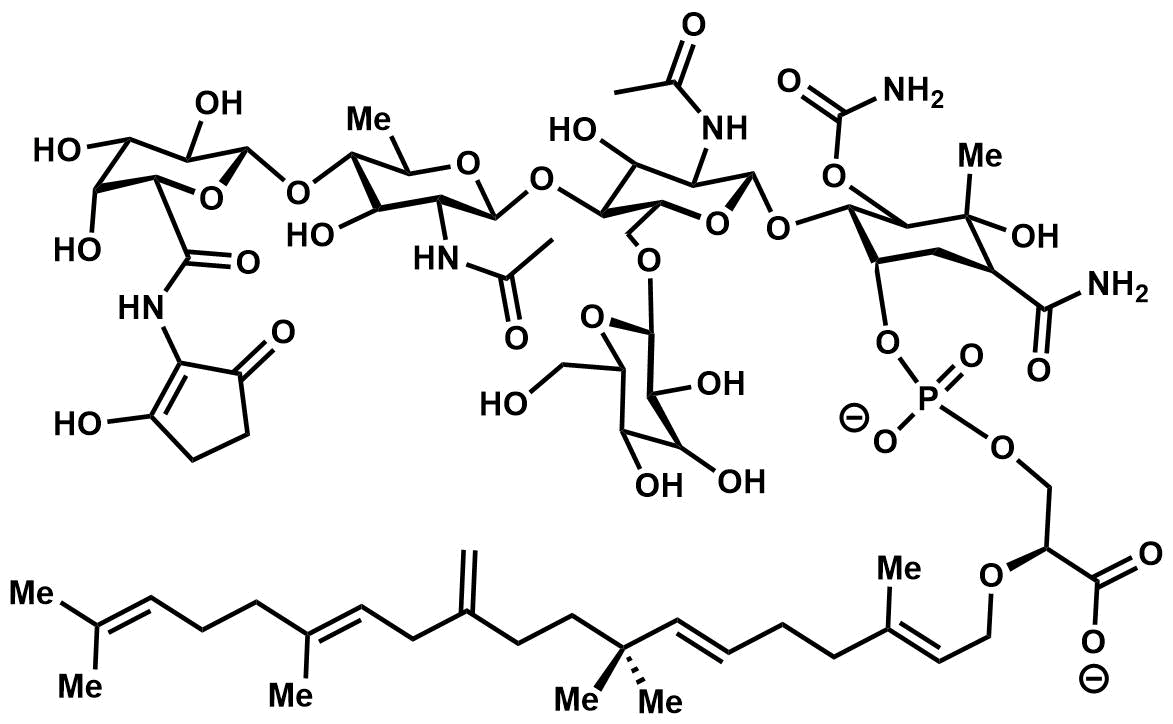
- Chemical structure of moenomycin A, one of the components of bambermycin

Clinical data
- Trade names: Gainpro
- AHFS/Drugs.com: FDA Professional Drug Information

Identifiers
- CAS Number: 11015-37-5
- DrugBank: DB11377
- UNII: PP922A42V2
- KEGG: D03050
- E number: E712 (antibiotics)

Bambermycin (flavomycin) is a complex of antibiotics obtained from Streptomyces bambergiensis and Streptomyces ghanaensis used as a food additive for beef cattle, dairy cattle, poultry and swine. The complex consists mainly of moenomycins A and C.

Bambermycin is a performance-enhancing antibiotic intended and available solely for use in animal nutrition. Its mechanism of action is to inhibit the synthesis of the bacterial wall. Bambermycin is predominantly effective against Gram-positive pathogenic bacteria. However, it does not have significant action against Lactobacillus, Bifidobacterium, and other protective bacteria.

Bambermycin has no precautions or warnings to humans on its label pertaining to mixing and handling and is non-hazardous when used according to label directions. Bambermycin has no withdrawal requirement. Bambermycin is not absorbed by the intestine and no measurable residues are found in edible tissues even when fed at up to 50 times the normal recommended dosage.

Synonyms include flavomycin, flavofosfolipol, flavophospholipol, moenomycin, and the brand name Gainpro.
