= Streptomyces bottropensis =

Scientific classification
- Domain: Bacteria
- Kingdom: Bacillati
- Phylum: Actinomycetota
- Class: Actinomycetes
- Order: Streptomycetales
- Family: Streptomycetaceae
- Genus: Streptomyces
- Species: S. bottropensis

Binomial name
- Streptomyces bottropensis Waksman 1961

Type strain
- AS 4.1669, ATCC 25435, B-25, B-35, BCRC 12063, CBS 163.64, CBS 667.69, CCRC 12063, CGMCC 4.1669, CIP 105278, DSM 40262, ETH 23899, IFO 13023, ISP 5262, JCM 4459, KACC 20131, KCC S-0459, MTCC 4729, NBRC 13023, NRRL ISP-5262, NRRL-ISP 5262, RIA 1215, VKM Ac-1755

Species of bacterium

Streptomyces bottropensis is a bacterium species from the genus Streptomyces which has been isolated from soil. Streptomyces bottropensis produces bottromycin, dunaimycin and mensacarcin. Streptomyces bottropensis can metabolize (+)-carvone to (+)-bottrospicatol.

== See also ==
- List of Streptomyces species
