= Streptomyces prasinus =

Scientific classification
- Domain: Bacteria
- Kingdom: Bacillati
- Phylum: Actinomycetota
- Class: Actinomycetes
- Order: Streptomycetales
- Family: Streptomycetaceae
- Genus: Streptomyces
- Species: S. prasinus

Binomial name
- Streptomyces prasinus Ettlinger et al. 1958

Type strain
- AMMRL 20.36, ATCC 19800, BCRC 13681, CBS 552.68, CCRC 13681, CGMCC 4.1920, DSM 40099, ETH 13815, ICMP 144, IFO 12810, ISP 5099, JCM 4192, JCM 4603, KCC S-0192, KCC S-0603, NBIMCC 1484, NBRC 12810, NRRL B-2712, NRRL-ISP 5099, NZRCC 10340, RIA 1079, UNIQEM 186, VKM Ac-1725

Synonyms
- Streptomyces bambergiensis Wallhäusser et al. 1966 (Approved Lists 1980)

Species of bacterium

Streptomyces prasinus is a bacterium species from the genus of Streptomyces which has been isolated from soil on Mallorca in Spain. Streptomyces prasinus produces prasinomycin, validamycin, prasinon A and prasinon B.

== See also ==
- List of Streptomyces species
