= Puromycin =

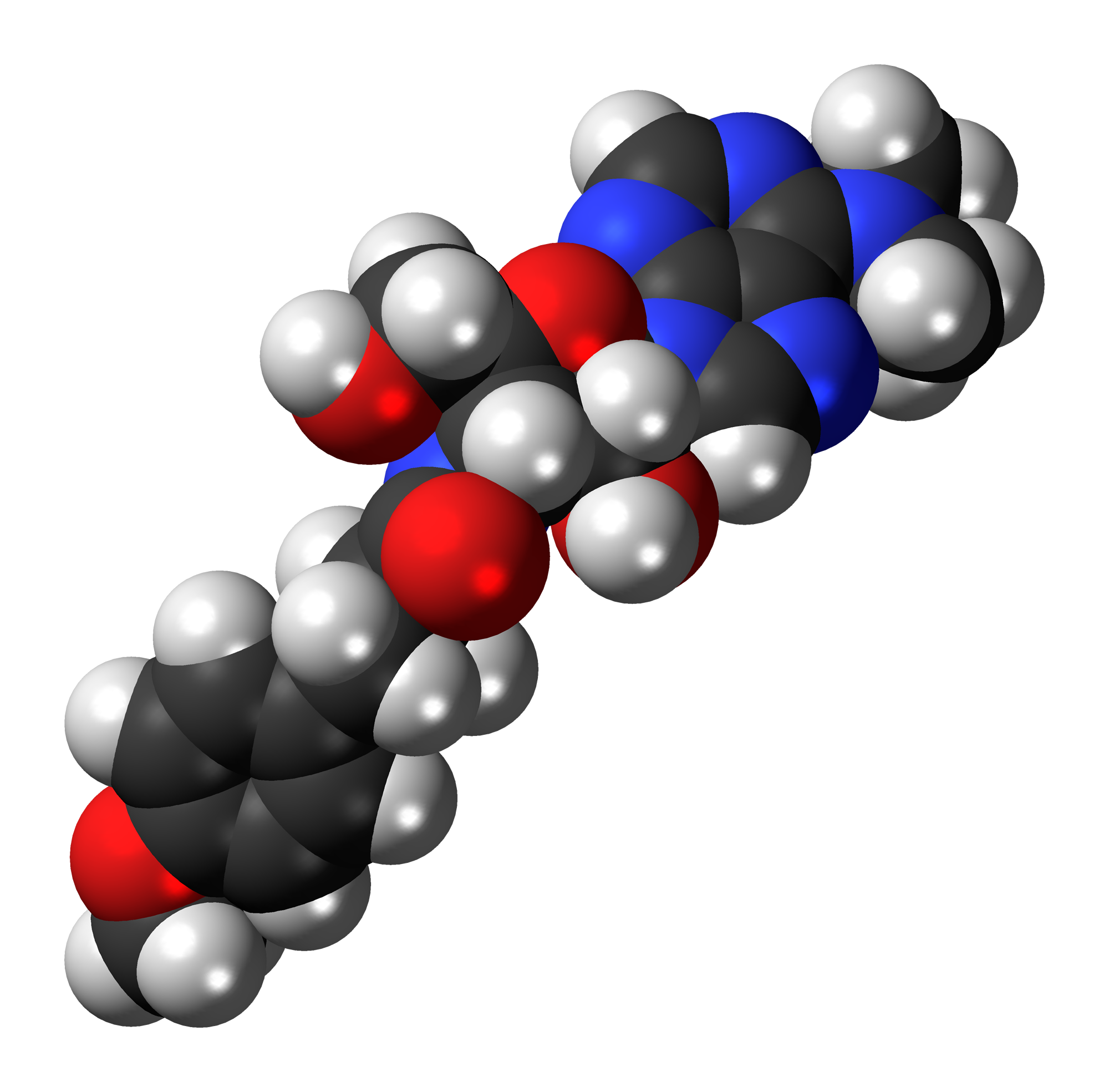

Names
- IUPAC name 3′-Deoxy-N,N-dimethyl-3′-(O-methyl-L-tyrosinamido)adenosine
- Systematic IUPAC name (2S)-2-Amino-N-{(2S,3S,4R,5R)-5-[6-(dimethylamino)-9H-purin-9-yl]-4-hydroxy-2-(hydroxymethyl)oxolan-3-yl}-3-(4-methoxyphenyl)propanamide

Identifiers
CAS Number	53-79-2 (free base); 58-58-2 (DiHCl)
3D model (JSmol)	Interactive image
ChEBI	CHEBI:17939
ChEMBL	ChEMBL469912
ChemSpider	388623
DrugBank	DB08437
KEGG	D05653
MeSH	Puromycin
PubChem CID	439530
UNII	4A6ZS6Q2CL; PGN54228S5 (DiHCl)
CompTox Dashboard (EPA)	DTXSID8036788
- InChI: InChI=1S/C22H29N7O5/c1-28(2)19-17-20(25-10-24-19)29(11-26-17)22-18(31)16(15(9-30)34-22)27-21(32)14(23)8-12-4-6-13(33-3)7-5-12/h4-7,10-11,14-16,18,22,30-31H,8-9,23H2,1-3H3,(H,27,32)/t14-,15+,16+,18+,22+/m0/s1 Key: RXWNCPJZOCPEPQ-NVWDDTSBSA-N; InChI=1/C22H29N7O5/c1-28(2)19-17-20(25-10-24-19)29(11-26-17)22-18(31)16(15(9-30)34-22)27-21(32)14(23)8-12-4-6-13(33-3)7-5-12/h4-7,10-11,14-16,18,22,30-31H,8-9,23H2,1-3H3,(H,27,32)/t14-,15+,16+,18+,22+/m0/s1 Key: RXWNCPJZOCPEPQ-NVWDDTSBBO
- SMILES: O=C(N[C@@H]3[C@H](O[C@@H](n2cnc1c2ncnc1N(C)C)[C@@H]3O)CO)[C@@H](N)Cc4ccc(OC)cc4

Properties
Chemical formula	C_{22}H_{29}N_{7}O_{5}
Molar mass	471.50956
- Except where otherwise noted, data are given for materials in their standard state (at 25 °C [77 °F], 100 kPa). verify (what is ?) Infobox references

Puromycin is an antibiotic protein synthesis inhibitor which causes premature chain termination during translation.

== Inhibition of translation ==
Puromycin is an aminonucleoside antibiotic, derived from the Streptomyces alboniger bacterium, that causes premature chain termination during translation taking place in the ribosome. Part of the molecule resembles the 3' end of the aminoacylated tRNA. It enters the A site and transfers to the growing chain, causing the formation of a puromycylated nascent chain and premature chain release. The exact mechanism of action is unknown at this time but the 3' position contains an amide linkage instead of the normal ester linkage of tRNA. That makes the molecule much more resistant to hydrolysis and stops the ribosome.

Puromycin is selective for either prokaryotes or eukaryotes.

Also of note, puromycin is critical in mRNA display. In this reaction, a puromycin molecule is chemically attached to the end of an mRNA template, which is then translated into protein. The puromycin can then form a covalent link to the growing peptide chain allowing the mRNA to be physically linked to its translational product.

Antibodies that recognize puromycylated nascent chains can also be used to purify newly synthesized polypeptides and to visualize the distribution of actively translating ribosomes by immunofluorescence.

== Peptidase inhibitor ==
Puromycin is a reversible inhibitor of dipeptidyl-peptidase II (serine peptidase) and cytosol alanyl aminopeptidase (metallopeptidase). The mechanism of inhibition is not well understood, however puromycin can be used to distinguish between aminopeptidase M (active) and cytosol alanyl aminopeptidase (inhibited by puromycin).

== Cell culture ==
Puromycin is used in cell biology as a selective agent in cell culture systems. It is toxic to prokaryotic and eukaryotic cells. Resistance to puromycin is conferred by the pac gene encoding a puromycin N-acetyl-transferase (PAC) that was found in a Streptomyces producer strain. Puromycin is soluble in water (50 mg/mL) as colorless solution at 10 mg/mL. Puromycin is stable for one year as solution when stored at -20 °C. The recommended dose as a selection agent in cell cultures is within a range of 1-10 μg/mL, although it can be toxic to eukaryotic cells at concentrations as low as 1 μg/mL. Puromycin acts quickly and can kill more than 99% of nonresistant cells within one day.

== Selection of Escherichia coli ==
Puromycin is poorly active on E. coli. Puromycin-resistant transformants are selected in LB agar medium supplemented with 125 μg/mL of puromycin. But use of puromycin for E. coli selection requires precise pH adjustment and also depends on which strain is selected. For hassle–free selection and optimum results the use of specially modified puromycin is possible. Plates containing puromycin are stable for 1 month when stored at 4 °C.

== Selection of yeast ==
Puromycin resistance in yeast can also be conferred through expression of the puromycin N-acetyl-transferase (pac) gene. Lethal concentrations of puromycin are much higher for strains of Saccharomyces cerevisiae than mammalian cell lines. Deletion of the gene encoding the multidrug efflux pump Pdr5 sensitizes cells to puromycin.

== Memory loss in mice ==
Long-term synaptic plasticity, such as is required for memory processes, requires morphological changes at protein level. As puromycin inhibits protein synthesis in eukaryotic cells, researchers were able to show that injections of this drug will result in both short-term as well as long-term memory loss in mice.

== Fragment reaction ==
Puromycin has been used as part of the "fragment reaction" to develop assays evaluating the activity of the large subunit of the ribosome (50S in bacteria). Puromycin, along with a 3' terminal fragment of N-formylmethionine(fMet)-tRNA^{fMet} and the 50S ribosomal subunit, are mixed in 33% ethanol and incubated at 0°C. If the 50S ribosomal subunit is catalytically active, the resulting products of the "fragment reaction" are tRNA and fMet-puromycin.
