= Streptomyces diastatochromogenes =

Scientific classification
- Domain: Bacteria
- Kingdom: Bacillati
- Phylum: Actinomycetota
- Class: Actinomycetia
- Order: Streptomycetales
- Family: Streptomycetaceae
- Genus: Streptomyces
- Species: S. diastatochromogenes

Binomial name
- Streptomyces diastatochromogenes (Krainsky 1914) Waksman and Henrici 1948 (Approved Lists 1980)

Type strain
- AS 4.1606, ATCC 12309, ATCC BCRC 13668, BCRC 13668, CBS 370.58, CBS 690.72, CCM 3113, CCRC 13668, CFBP 4540, CGMCC 4.1606, CIP 105123, DSM 40449, ETH 24420, ETH 31546, IFO 13389, IFO 3337, ISP 5449, JCM 4119, JCM 4746, KACC 20133, KCC 119, KCC S-0119, KCC S-0746, NBRC 13389, NBRC 3337, NRRL B-1698, NRRL-ISP 5449, OEU (T-6), OGATA 207, PSA 218, RIA 1350, VKM Ac-1760, VTT E-042624

Synonyms
- "Actinomyces diastatochromogenes" Krainsky 1914

Species of bacterium

Streptomyces diastatochromogenes is a bacterium species from the genus of Streptomyces. Streptomyces diastatochromogenes produces polyketomycin, concanamycin A, concanamycin B, concanamycin C, momofulvenone A, azdimycin, toyocamycin and oligomycins.

== See also ==
- List of Streptomyces species
