= Streptomyces puniciscabiei =

Scientific classification
- Domain: Bacteria
- Kingdom: Bacillati
- Phylum: Actinomycetota
- Class: Actinomycetia
- Order: Streptomycetales
- Family: Streptomycetaceae
- Genus: Streptomyces
- Species: S. puniciscabiei

Binomial name
- Streptomyces puniciscabiei Park et al. 2003

Species of bacterium

Streptomyces puniciscabiei is a streptomycete bacterium species known to cause potato common scab disease in Korea. Its type strain is S7^{7T} (=LMG 21391^{T} =KACC 20253^{T}). It has purple-red, spiny spores that are borne in simple rectus flexuous spore-chains.
