= Aplasmomycin =

Names
- IUPAC name sodium;(6R,9E,12R,14S,17R,25S,26R,28S,29E,32R,34S,37R)-12,32-dihydroxy-6,13,13,17,26,33,33,37-octamethyl-4,7,19,21,24,27,38,39,41,42-decaoxa-20-boranuidaoctacyclo[18.17.1.1^{1,34}.1^{2,20}.1^{5,8}.1^{14,18}.1^{25,28}.0_{18,22}]tritetraconta-9,29-diene-3,23-dione

Identifiers
CAS Number	61230-25-9
3D model (JSmol)	Interactive image
ChemSpider	4574317
PubChem CID	23665592
UNII	188EIU3O75
- InChI: InChI=1S/C40H60BO14.Na/c1-21-15-17-31-37(5,6)29(42)13-9-11-26-20-28(24(4)47-26)49-36(45)34-40-22(2)16-18-32(51-40)38(7,8)30(43)14-10-12-25-19-27(23(3)46-25)48-35(44)33-39(21,50-31)54-41(52-33,53-34)55-40;/h9-12,21-34,42-43H,13-20H2,1-8H3;/q-1;+1/b11-9+,12-10+;/t21-,22-,23-,24-,25-,26?,27+,28?,29-,30-,31+,32+,33?,34?,39?,40?,41?;/m1./s1 Key: GEIYDRPAWIMINR-QLICSODISA-N
- SMILES: [B-]123O[C@]45O[C@H](C([C@@H](C/C=C/[C@H]6O[C@@H]([C@H](C6)OC(=O)[C@H](O1)[C@]7(O2)O[C@H](C([C@@H](C/C=C/[C@H]8O[C@@H]([C@H](C8)OC(=O)[C@@H]4O3)C)O)(C)C)CC[C@H]7C)C)O)(C)C)CC[C@H]5C.[Na+]

Properties
Chemical formula	C_{40}H_{60}BNaO_{14}
Molar mass	798.71 g·mol^{−1}
- Except where otherwise noted, data are given for materials in their standard state (at 25 °C [77 °F], 100 kPa). Infobox references

Aplasmomycin is an antibiotic with antimalarial activity isolated from Streptomycete.
