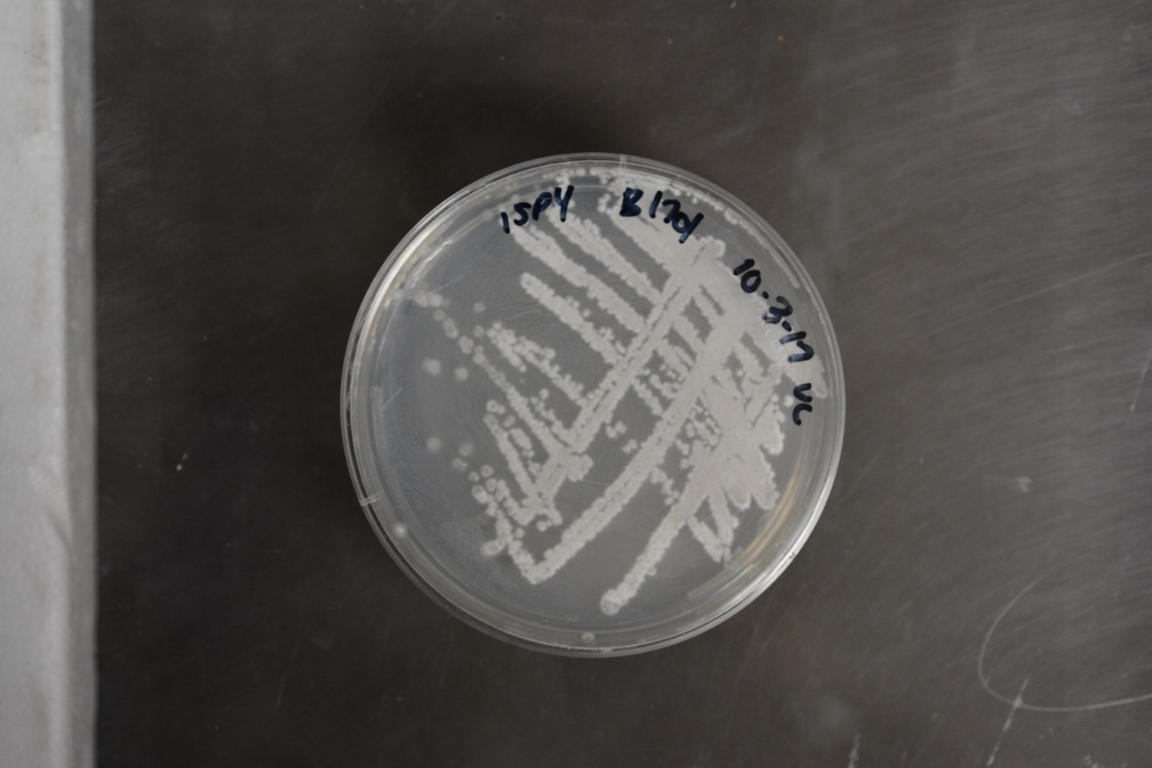

Scientific classification
- Domain: Bacteria
- Kingdom: Bacillati
- Phylum: Actinomycetota
- Class: Actinomycetia
- Order: Streptomycetales
- Family: Streptomycetaceae
- Genus: Streptomyces
- Species: S. antibioticus

Binomial name
- Streptomyces antibioticus (Waksman and Woodruff 1941) Waksman and Henrici 1948 (Approved Lists 1980)

= Streptomyces antibioticus =

Species of bacterium

Streptomyces antibioticus (previously known as Actinomyces antibioticus) is a gram-positive bacterium discovered in 1941 by Nobel-prize-winner Selman Waksman and H. Boyd Woodruff. Its name is derived from the Greek "strepto-" meaning "twisted", alluding to this genus' chain-like spore production, and "antibioticus", referring to this species' extensive antibiotic production. Upon its first characterization, it was noted that S. antibioticus produces a distinct soil odor.

== Discovery ==
Streptomyces antibioticus was discovered by Selman Waksman and H. Boyd Woodruff, who named the bacterium Actinomyces antibioticus. In their 1941 publication, Waksman and Woodruff describe their use of the "bacterial-agar plate method", in which they mixed a suspension of E. coli with washed agar containing 1.5% NaCl and 0.5% K_{3}PO_{4}_{.} To this blend, they added "fresh field or garden soil" that was diluted with sterile tap water, and plated their final mixture. They concluded that "bacterial antagonists", that is, antibiotic producing organisms, would produce clear patches in the agar. Through this method they isolated and characterized Actinomyces antibioticus. Two years later, Waksman renamed the organism Streptomyces antibioticus.

== Characteristics ==
=== Phylogeny ===
Streptomyces antibioticus belongs to the family Streptomycetacae, which contains two other genera: Micromonospora and Kitasatospora. 16S rRNA gene-based phylogeny shows that within the Streptomyces clade, the species S. antibioticus is more closely related to Streptomyces griseorubor than to any other Streptomyces species. One study showed that these two species form a late-diverging clade within the phylogenetic tree of the genus Streptomyces.

=== Genomics ===
The NCBI's GenBank contains thousands of DNA sequences for S. antibioticus genes, partial genome sequences, and three complete genome sequences. The currently available S. antibioticus genomes range in size from 8 to 10 million basepairs. As with other members of the Actinomycetes, the S. antibioticus genome is known to have a high GC content (>55%).

=== Physiology and ecology ===
Streptomyces species produce differentiated, branch-like structures known as hyphae, which collectively make up the organism's mycelium (plural mycelia). For Streptomyces antibioticus, as with other Streptomyces species, mycelia can be divided into two types: aerial and substrate. The substrate mycelium is formed for vegetative growth, whereas the aerial mycelium is formed for the purpose of spore production. Aerial hyphae branch out from the substrate mycelium and subsequently differentiate into chains of spores.

Streptomyces antibioticus is known to be an aerobic microorganism that resides in soil communities. S. antibioticus has been demonstrated to grow in temperatures ranging from 28–37 °C. As an Actinomycete, this microbe is inferred to behave as a mesophile in laboratory settings, having an optimum growth temperature between 25–30 °C. As a member of the genus Streptomyces, S. antibioticus is inferred to live off of organic matter in the soil, and possess the ability to degrade large polymers such as chitin and keratin. S. antibioticus has been shown to grow on several types of media, including gelatin, Litmus milk, Czapek's agar, and Peptone media.

== Medical relevance ==
=== Antibiotics ===
A unique trait of Streptomyces antibioticus is its ability to produce several antibiotics of different classes. Upon its discovery, it was found that S. antibioticus produced a then novel substance named Actinomycin. This substance was then separated into two compounds: Actinomycin A and Actinomycin B. Actinomycin A was found to be highly bacteriostatic (bacteria hindering) against all bacteria it was tested with. Actinomycin B displayed little bacteriostatic activity but was shown to be highly bactericidal (bacteria killing), particularly towards gram-positive bacteria. Actinomycin is also known to display antifungal properties.

The antibiotic Boromycin is also produced by S. antibioticus. This compound was first isolated from a S. antibioticus strain found in an African soil sample. Boromycin is active against gram-positive bacteria, but inactive against gram-negative bacteria. Boromycin has also been shown to have antifungal and antiprotozoal properties.

Certain Streptomyces antibioticus strains produce antibiotics that have yet to be named and thoroughly characterized, such as the one mentioned in a 1998 study from Calcutta University. The antibiotic described was found to show antimicrobial activity against gram-negative bacteria, gram-positive bacteria, and pathogenic fungi.

In addition to producing antibiotics, one strain of S. antibioticus has been discovered to induce a different species of Streptomyces to produce antibiotics. Research done by Li et al. from Osaka University studied a strain of S. antibioticus that produced a molecule with the ability to induce the organism Streptomyces virginiae to produce the antibiotic Virginiamycin.

Presently, bacterial diseases persist as a substantial cause of death worldwide. To further exacerbate this issue, the discovery antibiotic-resistant strains of bacteria is steadily increasing, a problem that raises the demand for novel antibiotics. Currently, over two thirds of the antibiotics clinically prescribed have been produced by species within the genus Streptomyces. With the recent availability of whole genome sequences, Streptomyces species known for producing antibiotics are being studied for potential new antibiotics that may be present in their genomes, but not yet characterized.

=== Nucleoside analogs ===
The strain NRRL 3238 produces the anticancer drug pentostatin and the antiviral (mainly herpes) drug vidarabine.
