= Common scab =

Plant disease affecting potatoes and other crops

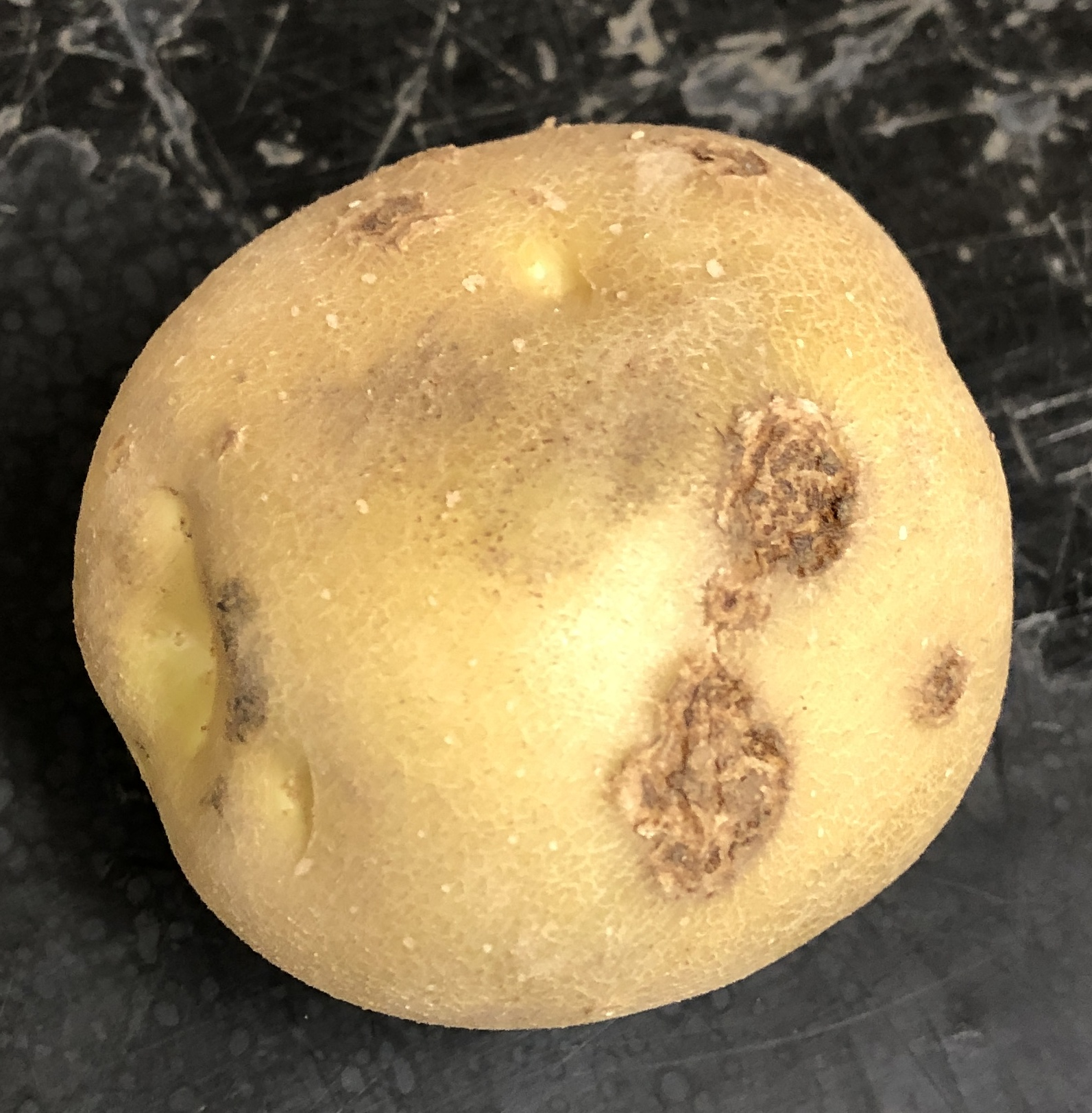
Common scab of potato

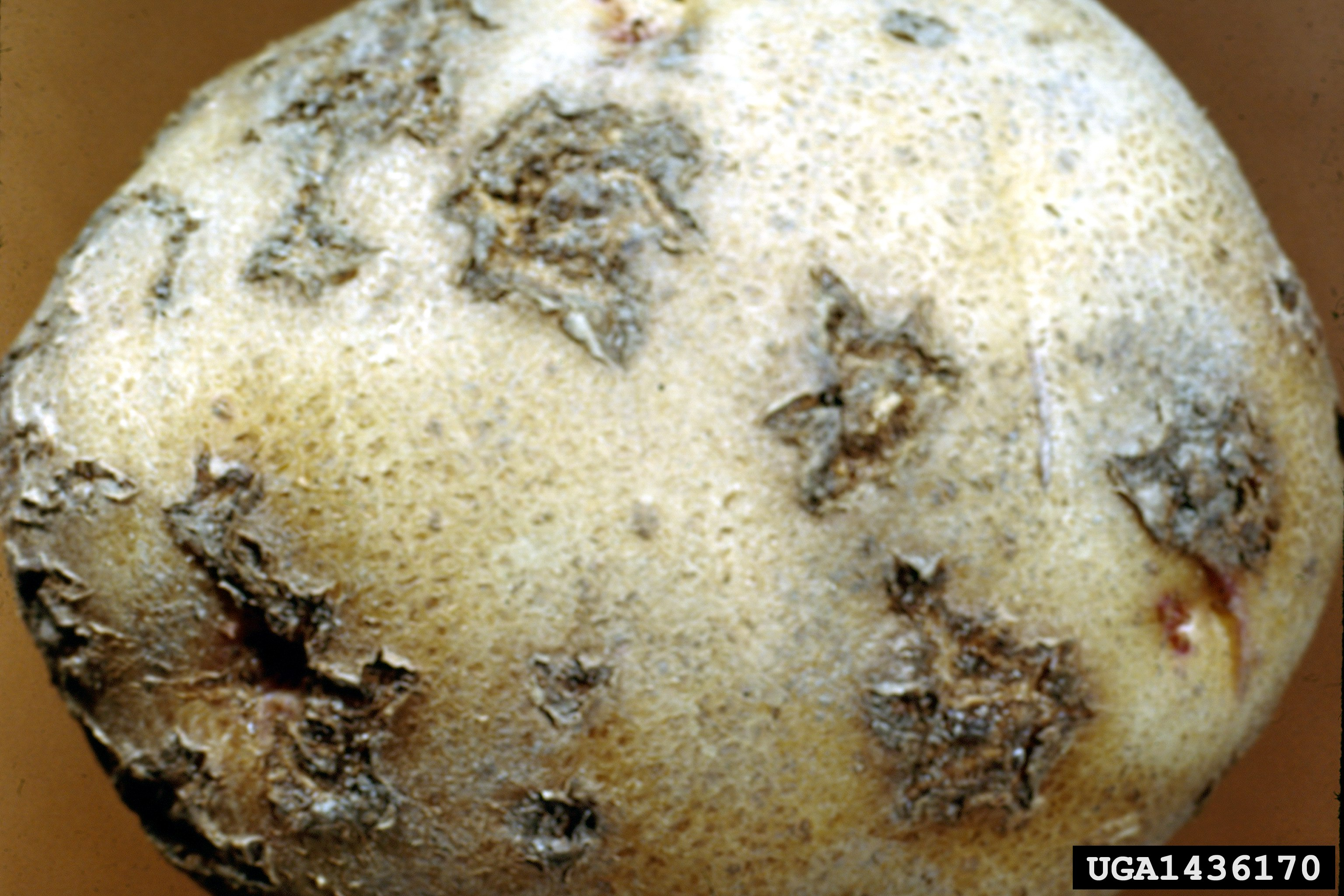
A potato infected by common scab

Common scab is a plant disease of root and tuber crops caused by a small number of Streptomyces species, specifically S. scabies, S. acidiscabies, S. turgidiscabies and others. Common scab mainly affects potato (Solanum tuberosum), but can also cause disease on radish (Raphanus sativus), parsnip (Pastinaca sativa), beet (Beta vulgaris), and carrot (Daucus carota). This plant disease is found wherever these vegetables are grown.

Common scab symptoms are variable and can range from surface russeting to deep pits in root and tuber vegetables. This disease does not usually affect yields, but it can greatly reduce quality of the harvested vegetables and make them unsuitable for sale.

Root and tuber vegetables are susceptible to infection by Streptomyces species as soon as the root or tuber forms, but, because this disease only affects root and tubers, the symptoms are not usually noted until harvest. Dry soils increase disease incidence and severity, therefore proper irrigation can aid in control of this disease. Common scab is suppressed if the soil pH is lower than 5.2, although scab lesions may still form in low pH soils due to physiological stresses or S. acidiscabies.

== History ==
The first known reference to common scab dates back to 1825 when it was included in John Claudius Loudon's Encyclopaedia of Agriculture. It was not known what caused it then, it was not thought to have a biological cause, but was noted to be associated with soils treated with alkaline materials. In 1884, Worthington George Smith suggested that it was caused by grit in soil irritating potato tubers as they grew. The theory gained much support, as it was known to be more common on light gritty soils. In 1890 however, Roland Thaxter isolated a microbe that could cause common scab lesions, naming it Oospora scabies. Over the years, this species was renamed several times, now being known as Streptomyces scabies. In 1977, the acid-tolerant S. acidiscabies was found to also cause common scab, and then in 1996, S. turgidiscabies was isolated.

== Hosts and symptoms ==
Common scab is a prevalent plant disease that is caused by the bacteria Streptomyces and it can affect a wide range of taproot crop hosts. Some examples of Streptomyces hosts are potatoes, beets, carrots, parsnips, radishes, rutabagas, and turnips. There are a few different symptoms that can arise from common scab. In some hosts, brown spots or lesions can appear on the surface of the root, and the severity can vary from mild spotting to deep pits on the surface. These lesions can cause secondary infections or attract nearby organisms and cause a lot of damage to the root. These symptoms are the same across the whole range of hosts. Although the disease does not affect the overall harvest, the appearance of infected plants is ruined. In crops such as potatoes, this can mean an unsellable crop and cause an extensive amount of loss for a farmer.

== Disease cycle ==
The life cycle of Streptomyces scabies or common scab in potato starts out as the pathogen overwinters in tubers left behind in the soil. As spring comes around, some of the hyphal like growths from mycelium develop cross walls that break into asexual spores and disperse through wind, rain, or movement of soil. The spores infect developing roots/tubers through natural openings or wounds. Mycelia grow through the external cell layers and allow the pathogen to feed on plant tissue. As the pathogen feeds, it produces lesions that are seen with common scab. This process repeats after the pathogen overwinters the following season.

== Management ==
Many different management styles can be used to lessen the severity of common scab. One of these can be crop rotation with non-host crops. This is a worthwhile strategy if there is enough land to work with. By rotating fields from root crops to non-root vegetables such as soybeans, the strength of the pathogen is reduced. If soil moisture is kept above 90% for the initial growth of root crops, this is another effective way of reducing the pathogenicity of streptomyces. Acidic soil (lower than pH 5.2) is also beneficial in eliminating the growth of streptomyces. By adding acidic fertilizer to a field over the course of a few years, the pH will not be suitable for the pathogen to grow. Finally, growing scab resistant cultivars will greatly improve crop appearance in the presence of streptomyces by decreasing the number of infected cultivars.

== See also ==
- List of potato diseases
