= The World According to Monsanto =

- Le monde selon Monsanto
- Written by: Marie-Monique Robin
- Directed by: Marie-Monique Robin
- Starring: David Baker; Ken Cook
- Music by: Olivier Auriol
- Countries of origin: France; Canada; Germany
- Original languages: English; Spanish; French

Production
- Producer: Marie-Monique Robin
- Cinematography: Étienne Carton de Grammont; Bernard Cazedepats; Arnaud Mansir; Guillaume Martin; Frédéric Vassort
- Editor: Françoise Boulègue
- Running time: 108 minutes
- Production companies: Image et Compagnie; Arte France; Office national du film du Canada; Productions Thalie; Westdeutscher Rundfunk

Original release
- Network: Arte
- Release: 17 February 2008

The World According to Monsanto is a 2008 film directed by Marie-Monique Robin. Originally released in French as Le monde selon Monsanto, the film is based on Robin's three-year-long investigation into the corporate practices around the world of the United States multinational corporation, Monsanto. The World According to Monsanto is also the title of a book written by Robin.

== Synopsis ==
The film reports many controversies surrounding the use and promotion of genetically modified seeds, polychlorinated biphenyls (PCBs), Agent Orange, and bovine growth hormone. Cases in the United States (including Anniston, Alabama), Canada, India, Mexico, Paraguay, the United Kingdom (Scotland) and France, are explored, claiming that the Monsanto corporation's collusion with governments, pressure tactics, suppression and manipulation of scientific data, and extra-legal practices aided the company's attempts at dominating global agriculture. Scientists, representatives of the United States Food and Drug Administration and the United States Environmental Protection Agency, civil society representatives, victims of the company's activities, lawyers, and politicians are interviewed.

In March 2008, French journalist Marie-Monique Robin released the results of her three years of worldwide research into Monsanto. A book was published by La Découverte, a French editor, and a video documentary, Le Monde selon Monsanto (The World According to Monsanto), was released on DVD and shown on Arte, the Franco-German culture TV channel.

Robin travels to India, Mexico, Argentina, and Paraguay to see how Monsanto's genetically modified organisms (GMOs) have affected local farmers using it for their crops. The film claims that GMO use has increased suicide rates of farmers in India.

== Participants ==
The original version of The World According to Monsanto was not only focused on GMOs but Monsanto’s bad behavior in general. Much of this material was contributed to and used by Marie-Monique Robin to by retired U.S. Environmental Protection Agency policy analyst William Sanjour. Sanjour, while working for EPA, had written a 21-page report titled “The Monsanto Investigation.” The report and its 62 end notes and other supporting material was loaned to Robin for her documentary. The report was “an analysis of the failure of EPA to investigate allegations that the Monsanto Company had falsified scientific studies on the carcinogenicity of dioxin.”

Film participants include David Baker, Ken Cook, Professor David Carpenter, Dan Glickman, James Maryanski, Jeffrey Smith, Michael Hansen, Jeremy Rifkin, Michael Taylor, Dr. Samuel Epstein, Shiv Chopra, Prof. Arpad Pusztai, Peter Melchett, Vandana Shiva, Prof. Ignacio Chapela, Prof. Stanley Ewen, Segundino, Elena Alvares Buyll, Aldo González Morales, Jonathan Matthews, Roberto Franco, Prof. Robert Bellé, Richard Burroughs, Pete Hardin, Ray Mowling, Lisa Watson, Margaret Haydon, Steven Druker, William Sanjour, Gerson Smoger, Prof. Ian Pryme, Troy Roush, David Runyon, Kiran Sakhari, Abdul Gayum, Kishor Tiwari, Tarak Kate, and Jorge Galeano.

== Reception ==
The book has been reviewed by Les Inrockuptibles, L'Express, AFP, Bakchich, L'Humanité, Télérama, Le Point, Politis, La Marseillaise among others. A review compares the book's impact to Rachel Carson's Silent Spring in raising awareness of the issues of Monsanto. La Recherche criticised the lack of a thorough examination of biotechnology in the book, but praised it as captivating and saying that it had a thriller style.

The Toronto Star described the film as taking a "scattershot approach", criticised its use of boring footage showing the creator googling for information, and notes that even though the documentary is available in English and available to the American public, Monsanto will probably not be constrained by them. The Globe and Mail described the film as "a well researched but stylistically flawed film", and criticised the use of footage showing Robin googling. Le Monde described the film as an edifying documentary, and praised the diversity in testimonies presented in the film. A later review feels that the film was one-sided until the phone conversation where Monsanto declined to appear was shown. The film was projected in the National Assembly before a debate on GMOs by the initiative of the Greens party and was described by Le Figaro as "a long and meticulous indictment against GMOs" ("s'agit d'un long et minutieux réquisitoire contre les OGM"). Rue89 described the film as "paced like a thriller on public health", and compared it to the film Erin Brockovich but without the satisfying conclusion of that film. La Presse describes the film as being not in the vein of Michael Moore's documentaries, but instead relying on the facts to make its point. In its showing on 11 March 2008, it had 1,569,000 viewers.

Biologist Marcel Kuntz denounced the film in an article published on the website of the French Association for Scientific Information (AFIS), describing the film as "replete with pseudoscientific claims" ("truffé d'allégations pseudo-scientifiques"). A review in Libération states that the film amalgamates the issues of GMO and Monsanto, and, citing the review by Marcel Kuntz, states that the film lacks scientific rigor.

The author of the book and film, Marie-Monique Robin, won the Rachel Carson Prize for her work on this project.
