= Pink Fir Apple potato =

Variety of potato

Pink Fir Apple
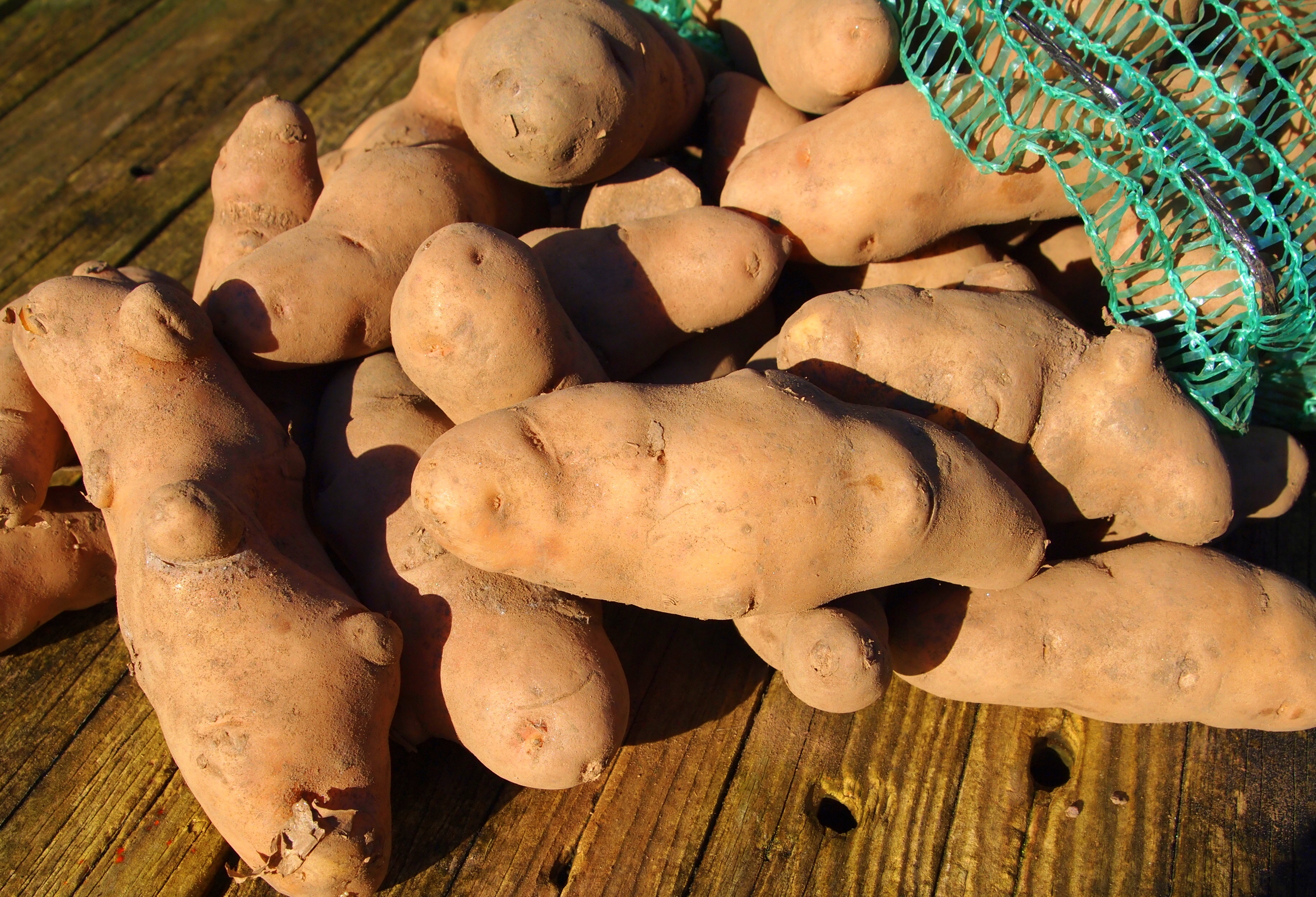
- 'Pink Fir Apple' potatoes
- Species: Solanum tuberosum
- Cultivar: 'Pink Fir Apple'
- Origin: France

The Pink Fir Apple potato is a maincrop potato variety with a long knobbly shape, pink skin, and creamy waxy flesh. Its shape makes it difficult to peel, unless boiled before peeling.

Pink Fir Apple potato was first imported to the United Kingdom from France in 1850, and in 1996 was crossed with the Désirée variety to form the Anya potato for Sainsbury's supermarkets.

== Characteristics ==
It grows to about 1.2 m (3 ft 11 in) in height. Its blooms, which are single form, normally with five petals, are about 2.5 cm (0.98 in) in diameter at full maturity and are coloured blue-violet, mauve taupe and light pastel purple.
