= Women in Kenya =

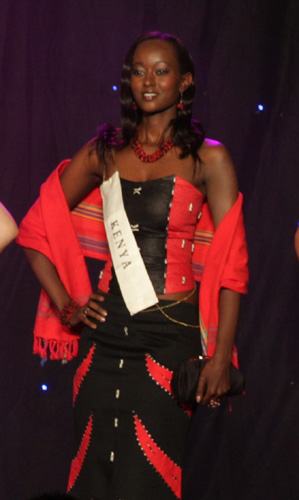
Ruth Kinuthia

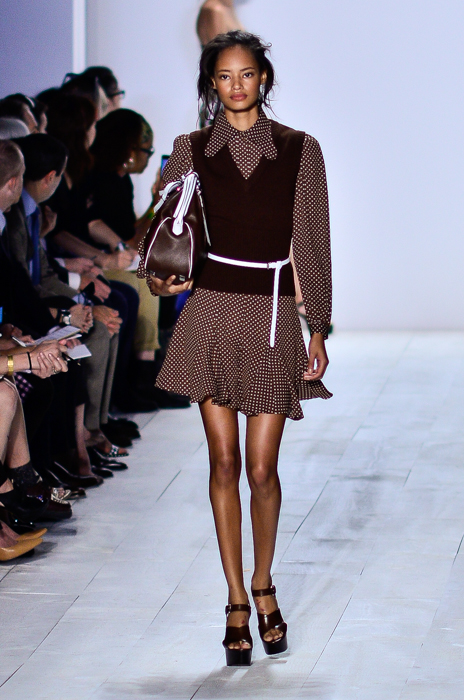
Malaika Firth

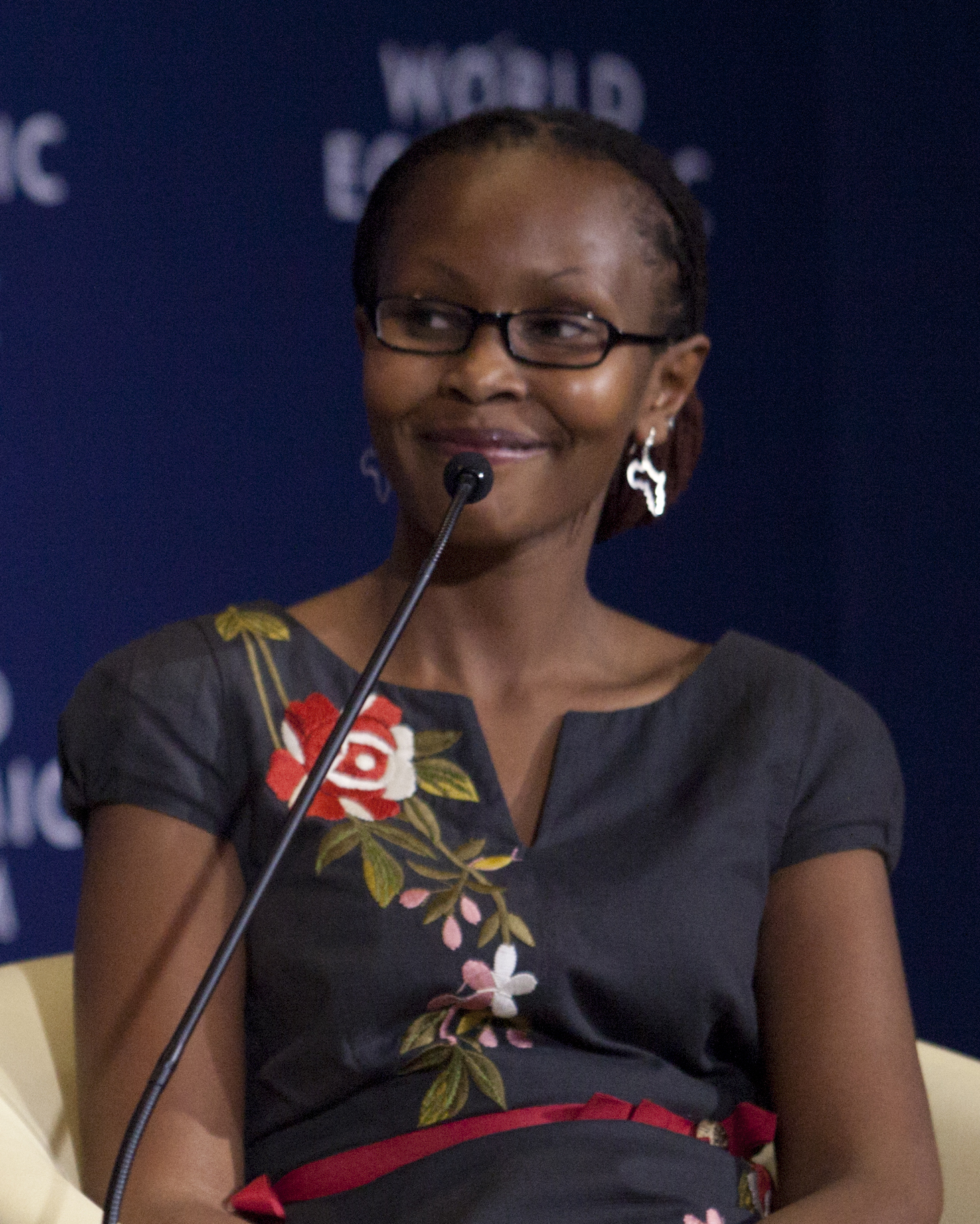
Juliana Rotich

General statistics
- Maternal mortality (per 100,000): 360 (2010)
- Women in parliament: 19.9% (2013)
- Women over 25 with secondary education: 25.3% (2012)
- Women in labour force: 62.0% (2012)

Gender Inequality Index
- Value: 0.506 (2021)
- Rank: 128th out of 191

Global Gender Gap Index
- Value: 0.729 (2022)
- Rank: 57th out of 146

The history of the evolution of the traits of women in Kenya can be divided into Women within Swahili culture, Women in British Kenya, and Kenyan Women post-Independence. The condition and status of the female population in Kenya has faced many changes over the past century.

Kenya was a British colony from 1888 until 1963. Before colonial rule, women had played important roles in the community, from raising and bringing up children to working on farms and in marketplaces. Under colonial rule, women became increasingly unimportant to the economic system, and their powers and influence soon faded from the public sphere. Despite this, some women such as Mekatilili wa Menza and other women including Muthoni wa Kirima who was part of the Mau Mau uprising fought alongside men during the campaign for independence and are acknowledged in the country's long history for their contributions.

After Kenya gained independence in 1963, women have still faced issues relating to sexism and have not been given many opportunities in sectors such as education except for a small number of young women. Women still face many problems, such as child marriages, arranged marriages, female genital mutilation, the AIDS epidemic, poor quality of maternal healthcare, as well as a lack of education. Although Kenya still has a long way to go in hearing the plight of women, there continues to be an improvement in financial, social and economic inclusion within the country at different stages ranging from dialogue, policy implementation, representation and so forth.

In Kenya, women have little opportunities to obtain decision making roles in the government, despite a gender rule in the 2010 constitution, which further sets women back. Although Kenya is behind in this case, there are a few influential women who haven taken seats in the Kenyan parliament.

== Women in Pre-Colonial Kenya ==
The main functions of women in most pre-colonial societies of Kenya were related to farming, child care, maintenance of the household, market vendors, and caring for their husbands, if married. There were a few matriarchal societies, but the power structures often favored men. In a few societies such as the Akamba, Kuria and the Nandi, women could marry women, often to protect them after their husbands died, or they discovered they could not bear children. In such settings, a woman would marry another woman and have children with a man of her choice.

== Women in Colonial Kenya (1888–1963) ==
The lives of Kenyan women changed significantly under colonial rule. The colony was primarily used for the purpose of establishing cash crop plantations owned by white settlers and staffed by Kenyan laborers. Under this system, the role of women became increasingly marginalized, and Kenyan women began losing autonomy in the family unit. Kenyan woman occupied a distant role in this economic system, but still strived to be equal to the men in making their voices heard by both the colonial authorities and men of Kenya.

In 1922, for example, a protest to demand the release of political activist Harry Thuku turned bloody after one of his most vocal supporters, Muthoni Nyanjiru, demanded the protestors to do something other than protest outside the police station. Nyanjiru was shot and killed by the police after the protestors stormed the station, and is today remembered as one of the first female Kenyan activists.

=== Missionary opposition to female genital mutilation/cutting (FGM/C) ===
Between 1929 and 1932, Protestant missionaries campaigned against the practice of female genital mutilation, and were met with resistance primarily by the Kikuyu. Lynn M. Thomas, an American historian, writes that during the female circumcision controversy, the issue of female genital mutilation became a focal point of the movement campaigning for independence from British rule, and a test of loyalty—either to the Christian churches of the missionaries, or to the Kikuyu Central Association, the largest association of the Kikuyu people.

== Women in Post-Independence Kenya (1963–) ==
During the post-independence period, women in Kenya continued to live in a society that had a patriarchal order. When Kenya gained independence in 1963, a few young women were able to attain education because of parents who became involved in religious mission activities since the Colonial era. Many of those who were not able to obtain education in schools, even those who were only 12 years old, were "married off". After 1995, due to the Beijing Platform for Action, many Kenyan women have benefited from the introduction of feminist point of views such as "female consciousness", "confidence as women", "gender equality" and justice for women. Many Kenyan women soon became active participants in Kenyan politics.

=== Education ===
The extent of education women received in pre-colonial Kenya was how to do the jobs women had been doing for years such as wife, caregiver, child birth and housekeeping. Playing this role gave many Kenyan women a sense of identity which most women cherished. During and after colonial rule, however, educating the youth became a more commonly accepted idea. Although there was access to education, it was difficult for Kenyan children, especially girls, to receive a formal education simply because parents did not find it necessary to send their daughters to school. The education that young girls were receiving was similar to that of what they would learn from their mothers in the pre-colonial era. That included skills such as child care and sewing and if the girls were lucky, they would be taught how to read and write. In the late 1900s it became more common for a girl to receive a primary education, but men, on the other hand, were going off to earn degrees and get jobs whereas women were staying at home taking care of the home.

By the 1990s, almost 50% of the students attending primary schools in Kenya were girls. This large jump occurred over time due to Kenya's independence and the development of easier accessible public primary schools throughout Kenya. The Kenyan government has put a larger focus on educating the youth because they believe that it will lead to an overall more prosperous country. According to the Republic of Kenya Embassy's website, they concluded, "...it has been established that by providing primary education to women, a society is able to hasten its development."

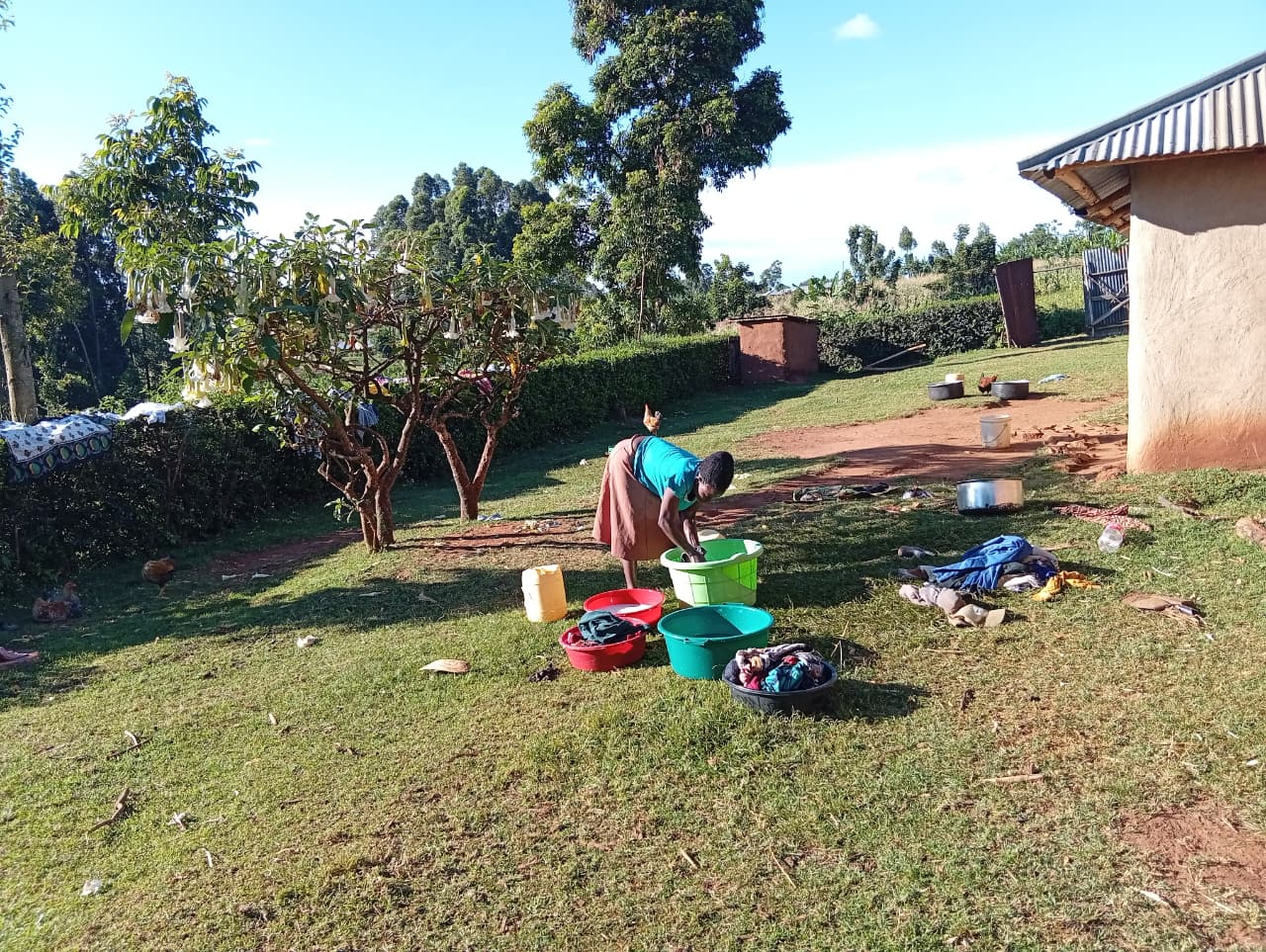
Woman in Kuria washing clothes

The situation for Kenyan girls in secondary school is slightly different than how it was for primary school. At the time of Independence, about 32% of enrollment in Kenyan secondary schools was young women and 68% young men. Over time, those numbers have gone up, but in the most recent studies, it is still 40% to 60% favoring young men attending secondary schools in Kenya. This gap can be explained by the gap between schools available for boys and girls. In 1968 in Kenya, there were 148 government funded primary schools for boys, 61 government funded secondary schools for girls, and 28 co-ed secondary schools funded by the government. Because young men in Kenya have more than twice the number of schools available for them to attend than their female counterparts, many more boys end up going to school because it is easier for them to access secondary schooling. More secondary schools have been built in Kenya since 1968, but that large gap still remains.

=== Property rights ===
Kenyan women's rights to own and inherit property are challenged, threatened and suppressed by customs, laws, and individuals, such as government officials. Many leaders, both of the nation and individual households, believe women to be incompetent to manage land. This is juxtaposed by the fact that, in Africa, women constitute 70–90 percent of the agricultural labor force, meaning that they manage most of the lands already, but are made unable to own any. In addition, African women receive about 7% of agricultural extension services and 10% of credit for small-farmers.

When women are widowed, they are often evicted from the lands and houses on which they reside, as they belonged to the husband, and women are not given any rights to the land. If a husband dies from an AIDS-related illness, wives are more often evicted with more vigor, as she is blamed for his death. Once evicted, some women end up begging for water and food, living in dangerous slums, and sleeping on cardboard with their children, who are also forced to leave school.

Widows are entitled to none of their husband's estate or assets when they die, and so women are often left virtually powerless under the rules of their in-laws. Often the in-laws feel entitled to do whatever they will with their late sons wives, as they consider the dowry paid for the marriage to be an act of purchasing the woman.

Divorced women often leave marriages with no property or items at all. It is common for them to return to live with their parents.

Widows and separated women with HIV often have a hard time receiving medical care, as they have no health insurance and no means of income, especially when their lands and all their possessions are taken from them.

==== Governance ====
In the 2010 constitution, gender discrimination in law, customs, and traditional authorities was officially prohibited. In 2011, a court case determined married women have the rights to inherit their parents' land. However, these practices are often not enforced. When women reach out to police and other officials for aid regarding abuse or infractions against their rights to property, they are commonly told to pay a bribe.

==== Effects ====
A 2009 publication by the World Bank, the Food and Agriculture Organization, and the International Fund for Agricultural Development found that improving women's land rights would grow agricultural output and better nutritional intake and child schooling.

The International Center for Research on Women (ICRW) found a large disparity between the rates of domestic violence against women who held property and those who did not. The study found that 49% of women with no property had experienced violence from a partner or family member, as compared to 7% of those with land and a house. Women in Kenya play a vital role in agriculture production, in Kenya they represent between 42 and 65 percent of the agriculture labor force.

=== Maternal healthcare ===
Maternal healthcare has improved recently for Kenyan women. Generally, maternal mortality rates have reduced, however, difficulties within the rural parts of Kenya persist as healthcare can be inaccessible in rural areas because of distances. In Western Kenya, healthcare institutions often do not have electricity or clean water, and are unable to provide women with the necessary services. In 2016, only 16% of its healthcare establishments were equipped to deliver emergency obstetric services. Additionally, the rate of maternal mortality, referring to deaths linked to pregnancy, was reported to be 355 per 100,000 live births in 2024. Maternal mortality remains heavily influenced by poor quality healthcare, with over 80% of deaths still linked to this issue, despite an increase in skilled midwives assisting births from 62% to 70% from 2017 to 2024.

In 2022, an initiative known as Boda Girls was launched in rural Kenya, where transport was an overlooked barrier to women's health and economic empowerment, as access to a clinic was both expensive and difficult. The initiative consists of women riders trained not only in motorcycle riding but also basic maternal health and patient care, where many of the women riders are nurses or community health workers.

=== Economic empowerment and contributions ===
Over time, the role of Kenyan women in society has evolved from more traditional duties like homemakers, to vital participants in the country’s economy. Women today contribute significantly to the Gross Domestic Product of Kenya, particularly through small and medium-sized businesses, where they often hold both job and ownership positions. These successful women business owners are able to provide for their families, assist their communities, elevate their living conditions, and help transcend poverty. In the agriculture sector, a sizable portion of smallholdings is overseen by women. Women are also managing and directing both food and cash crop production. Many of Kenya’s women’s groups start as informal savings circles and gradually develop into formal organizations or Non-Governmental Organizations (NGOs). Women entrepreneurs are assisted in navigating challenges by these NGOs. These organizations offer women the support, tools and expertise they need to achieve financial independence. Additionally, Kenyan women have access to credit through various Microfinance institutions which has enabled them to save and secure loans to start or expand businesses.

=== Governmental policies for women empowerment ===
Over the years, the government of Kenya has been taking particular steps for the empowerment of women. Two primary funding opportunities aimed at empowering women have been introduced

1. Uwezo Fund in 2013, based on the advancement of skills and capabilities of the disadvantaged in order to boost their economic conditions.

2. During 2007, the Women Enterprise Fund programme was proposed by the Kenyan government and came into action in 2009. It aimed at providing accessible and affordable credit to support women in starting and/or expanding businesses for wealth and employment creation.

The legislative body of the country has taken initiatives to encourage women to enroll in educational programs through the Kenya Education Sector Support Programme (KESSP) (2005-2010). Moreover, a decision was made by the Kenyan government in 2004 regarding re-enrolling pregnant women and women who got married early in school to finish their studies.

=== Sexual autonomy and HIV exposure ===
Many clans in Kenya, along with other locations in Eastern Africa, believe that the spirit of a widow's late husband stays with her body. To rid the body of the purported haunting, widow's in-laws will pay men from outside the clan to rape the widow without a condom. Some of these men, called "cleansers" are paid as little as USD$6. As HIV/AIDS continues to be a crisis, with an exceptional growth in African nations, widows fear they will contract HIV during these forced encounters. Some of the men who force the acts worry too; as one "cleanser" who has performed the act on 75 different women told the Human Rights Watch: "I don't use condoms with the women. It must be body to body. I must put sperm in her... If no sperm comes out, she is not inherited... I don't do anything to stop pregnancy... I've heard about how you get AIDS. I'm getting scared... There are inheritors who are infected with HIV. They don't use condoms."

Throughout Kenya, there is also a common practice of "wife inheritance" where, after the death of their husbands, widows are raped by an outsider to be considered "cleansed", and then are taken as the wife of one of her late-husband's family members. This is often done in polygamous families, so the wife will have unprotected intercourse with a stranger and a man with multiple other wives who also do not use protection.

In one of the provinces where both ritual "cleansing" and wife inheritance are common, the population's rate of HIV prevalence is at about 14%.

Women who are subjected to domestic violence often have a difficult or impossible time negotiating condom use, and then have higher risks of unwanted pregnancies and sexually transmitted infections (STIs), including HIV.

=== Polygamy in Kenya ===
In March 2014, the Kenyan parliament passed a bill allowing men to marry multiple wives. Polygamy is common among rural communities in Kenya, as well as among the country's Muslim community.

The proposed 2014 polygamy bill had initially given a wife the right to veto the husband's marriage to a new bride, but male members of Parliament overcame political divisions to push through a text that dropped this clause. The passing of the bill caused angered female members of Parliament to storm out of the late night vote on the polygamy legislation in protest.

== Women in Activism and Politics ==
The first woman in Kenya elected to hold a political position was Grace Onyango. She holds many firsts such as the first female councillor, the first female mayor in post-independence Kenya, and the first woman elected to Parliament. She achieved all these firsts between 1964 and 1969, and served in Parliament until 1984. She was also the first female parliamentarian to occupy the temporary speaker's chair, before being officially elected Deputy Speaker between 1979 and 1984. Other women who served in Parliament in the first three decades after independence include Dr. Phoebe Asiyo, Chelagat Mutai, and Dr. Julia Ojiambo. Other notable female politicians include Prof. Wangari Maathai, Charity Ngilu, Naisula Lesuuda, Esther Passaris, Millie Odhiambo, Prof. Margaret Kamar, Sophia Abdi Noor, and many others.

Following the new constitution in 2010, politics in Kenya took a different turn. There was a shift from the unitary system and structure of government to a decentralized one where authority and responsibility of public functions were redistributed to local governments. The country was divided into 47 counties, and each has its own local government, headed by a Governor. All 47 seats were won by men during the first election under the new constitution in 2013.

It was just in the 2017 elections that three women were voted into the Governors seat for the first time. The elected governors were Joyce Laboso for Bomet County, Anne Waiguru for Kirinyaga County and Charity Ngilu for Kitui County.

=== Wangari Maathai ===
One of the most notable Kenyans was Prof. Wangari Maathai, an activist and politician. Wangari Maathai was the first African woman to receive the Nobel Peace Prize for her "contribution to sustainable development, democracy and peace." She was also elected a member of the Kenyan parliament and worked in Kenyan politics for over two decades which was extremely threatening to her male counterparts who she surpassed throughout her time working in the Kenyan Government. As Assistant Minister for the Environment in Mwai Kibaki's first-term, she embarked on several campaigns to protect the environment and reduce government wastage. She, for example, changed how government reports were presented, urging for a smaller font, less space, and use of both sides of the printing paper.

Maathai was not directly a feminist activist, but an environmental activist who inspired other women in Kenya and around the world to go into politics and activism. Maathai was also considered to be a "bottom-up" worker as opposed to the "top-down" ruling that Kenya was so accustomed to having for decades past. This was another way she was able to inspire women and other minority groups who were silenced by the government in the past.

=== Women Activists ===
Grassroots activism is an important social force in Kenya, especially for women and is not just a modern phenomenon. Campaigns led by Kenya women have included issues such as FGM, women's political participation and gender-based violence. Leading protests can put activists like Wanjeri Nderu at risk of violence. Human rights campaigner Philo Ikonya fled to Norway after being beaten by police. Despite this Kenya women activists have won international awards for their efforts: Fatuma Abdulkadir Adan was awarded the Stuttgart Peace Prize; Dekha Ibrahim Abdi was awarded several prizes for her work on peace and reconciliation in Kenya before her 2011 death. Grace Lolim is the chair of the Isiolo Peace Committee.

== Women in Arts and Sports ==
In 1937, Margaret Trowell founded an art school within Makerere University in Kampala. Her first student was a Kenyan woman, Rosemary Karuga, and her students included others such as Theresa Musoke, the first woman to obtain a degree at Makerere. Since then, Kenyan women have thrived in different forms of art; for example, Magdalene Odundo's pottery is world-famous. other famous artists include Beatrice Wanjiku, Barbara Minishi, Wangechi Mutu, Syowia Kyambi and Ingrid Mwangi.

In 2014, actress Lupita Amondi Nyongo, her roots from Kisumu City in Western Kenya, brought the first Oscar win to Africa and therefore Kenya for her performance in the critically acclaimed film 12 Years a Slave. Lupita Nyongo who was born in Mexico but brought up in Nairobi has had a passion for acting and directing since she was a child. She performed in both primary and secondary school, then had a stint in theatre at the famous Phoenix Players in Nairobi. She had a significant acting role on MTV Shuga and then after completing her studies at the prestigious Yale, she successfully made it to the big screen in both Hollywood and internationally as well as on Broadway. Lupita has played a significant role in creating awareness about the negative effects of Colourism and Racism in society, in the process, writing and publishing a children's book Sulwe as well as creating the documentary In My Genes.

In 2018, Kenyan film director, producer and author Wanuri Kahiu released Rafiki, a story about two girls who fall in love with each other and struggle to navigate this love with their families in a homophobic society. The firm premiered at the 2018 Cannes Film Festival, and was also shown at the 2018 London Film Festival. It was, however, banned in Kenya until the ban was temporarily lifted by a court order.

In sports, especially athletics, Kenyan women are dominant across the globe. Some of the most notable athletes include Lorna Kiplagat, who was born in Kabiemit in Rift Valley. She switched her nationality to Dutch in 2003. Others include Catherine Ndereba, Pamela Jelimo, Vivian Cheruiyot, Nancy Langat, Eunice Jepkorir, Linet Masai, Ruth Bosibori and many others.

== See also ==
- Women in Africa
- Gender disparities in Kenyan education

== See also ==
- Women in Africa
