= Horn of Africa Development Initiative =

Horn Of Africa Development Initiative
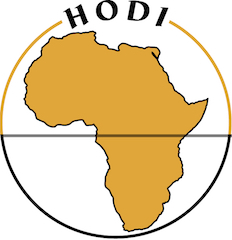
- Horn of Africa Development Initiative logo
- Abbreviation: HODI
- Formation: 2003 (23 years ago)
- Founder: Fatuma Abdulkadir Adan
- Founded at: Marsabit, Kenya
- Type: Non-governmental
- Headquarters: Marsabit, Kenya
- Staff: 25 (2017)
- Website: hodiafrica.org

The Horn Of Africa Development Initiative (HODI) is a non-profit organisation based in Marsabit, Kenya. Founded by Fatuma Abdulkadir Adan in 2003, the organisation's mission is to champion justice and development in northern Kenya through advocacy, facilitation of education, community cohesion (through football), and livelihood support programs.

== History and structure ==
HODI began in 2003 as a community based organisation in Marsabit, Kenya. The initial focus of the organisation was to address the inequality of access to legal services for the poor people of Marsabit. In 2007, HODI became registered as an NGO. As of November 2017, the HODI staff has grown to over 25 members. HODI serves roughly 7000 people, with offices in Marsabit, Kenya, and Moyale, Ethiopia.

== Football program "Shoot To Score, Not To Kill" ==
The organisation is known for its use of a program known as "Shoot To Score, Not To Kill" through which football is used as a voice in the advocacy for peace among members of different ethnicity in northern Kenya. The football program focuses on "disarming" the mind to accept those who are different, and promotes peaceful acts on the football field. The games have 3 halves, which allows the players to converse when not playing. Since 2008, this program has been helping to stop children from falling into ethnic rivalry and violence (notably tribe wars). "Shoot To Score, Not to Kill" puts an emphasis on empowering soldiers, young people, as well as resolving conflict peacefully between tribes at war. Some of the young girls that started playing football with HODI in the early days have since become coaches and captains for the future generation of players. HODI has hosted their "Kenya-Ethiopia Cross Border Football for Peace" event which brings young people, including warriors from conflicting clans, to play football. At these conferences, there are two parts. The first part sets out to talk about conflicts, and peace resolution action plans. The second half is the football tournament.

== Education programs ==
Through their education program, HODI empowers women and girls to have an active voice in their communities. This program trains women about alternative livelihoods. After graduation of the program, those women become role models in their communities, and continue to educate future generations. HODI also trains paralegals, to provide legal aid to less fortunate people that would otherwise not have those services.

== Notable events ==
- In 2002, the HODI Girls' Championship assembled 200 teenage girls from different villages and tribes in northern Kenya. The tournament helped bring awareness, and break down the silence around traditional practices that are harmful to women, such as child marriage and female genital mutilation (FGM).
- In January 2011, Adan received the Stuttgart Peace Prize for her work with the Horn of Africa Development Initiative "combining soccer and emancipation".
- In 2015, the organisation won a Beyond Sport Award for sport for social inclusion.
- In 2008, seven girls were kidnapped from a HODI football game, and were then tortured (raped and beaten). HODI founder, Adan, spent two years searching for them, retrieved three, but was not able to retrieved the remaining four.

== Kenyan conflicts ==
- Recent Kenyan conflicts have been fueled by climate change induced drought.

== See also ==
- 2007-2008 Kenyan crisis
