= Domestic violence in Kenya =

Domestic violence in Kenya constitutes any harmful behavior against a family member or partner, including rape, assault, physical abuse, and forced prostitution. Domestic violence in Kenya reflects worldwide statistics in that women are the overwhelming majority of victims. Over 40% of married women in Kenya have reported being victims of either domestic violence or sexual abuse. Worldwide, over 30% of "ever-partnered women" aged 15 and older have experienced physical or sexual partner violence. The distinct factors and causes of this high percentage have often not been studied due to lack of data.

Factors such as low levels of education, religion, and socioeconomic status all are relevant when looking at the causes of domestic violence in Kenya. Sexual coercion is prevalent in Kenya and often leads to abuse as well. Pregnant women are more likely to be victims of domestic abuse because they are more likely to be in a relationship. Pregnant women are often also economically or socially vulnerable, putting them at a higher risk for domestic violence due to the patriarchal dominance. Unwanted pregnancies are often seen as the fault of the woman, leading to more abuse. The gender roles in Kenya contribute to the acceptance of domestic abuse.

Domestic violence also contributes to negative mental and physical health effects. Negative outcomes of domestic violence include pregnancy loss, complications, hypertension, physical injuries, and stress. In recent cases deaths have been reported. In addition, victims of domestic violence are more likely to contract HIV/AIDS and other sexually transmitted diseases. Responses to domestic violence in Kenya include legal mandates and programs set in place by social organizations. Underreporting of domestic violence in developing countries is due to many reasons, including shame, financial barriers, lack of awareness of access to services, and distrust of healthcare worker].

== Causes ==
=== Sexual coercion ===
In Kenya, along with in other parts of Africa, sexual coercion among adolescents is common. Sexual coercion is defined as any experience in which a person is "compelled to have sex against his or her will." In a research survey in Kenya in 2004, 11% of men and 21% of women aged 10–24 had experienced sexual coercion in their lifetime. Women reported that intimate partner coercion was the most common form, with coercion by acquaintances following. Only 23% of these women and 22% of these men told a close family member or friend about the experience.

In 2014 the Kenya Demographic and Health Survey issued a report stating about 44 per cent of Kenyan women had encountered physical abuse by men since they were a Juvenile.

=== Gender inequality ===
Women with low levels of education are also often of low socioeconomic status and must depend financially on a male partner, often leading to abuse. Poor women also depend on men for household maintenance. In some relationships, men prevent their wives from being employed, keeping them trapped within both their physical home and within the man's control. These women remain silent in the face of abuse.

Women transgressing gender norms often also leads to abuse. If a woman does not act with respect and obedience, or does not complete her chores, she is "disciplined" by her partner. In addition, men are also threatened by women making independent decisions. If a couple has agreed upon a decision and the woman goes against it, it is cause for violence. If a woman questions the financial choices of a man, or makes him feel as if he is not providing for the family well, the man often uses violence in his anger.

In a study with a focus group of male and female nurses in Africa showed that male infidelity is a commonly accepted situation, and is even encouraged, whereas female infidelity is seen as behavior that merits physical abuse. In addition, because a man's right to infidelity is accepted so widely, a female's refusal to allow this behavior also was seen as warranting abuse.

In the men's focus group, domestic violence against women was also viewed as a way to forgive a woman's "transgressions." The studies also found that when surveyed alone, women claimed that the violence was a form of love. It is widely accepted that after a husband's "punishment" or the abuse, the woman regains dignity in the household and is the receiver of love from her partner.

=== Education ===
Lack of education in Kenya also contributes to the prevalence of abuse. In the 2003 "Demographic & Health Surveys", a clear link was made between the respondent's level of education and the percentage of people who believe that "it is justified for a man to hit his wife, if she argues with him." The survey was done with both men and women, and the general trend for both showed that as years in education of the respondent increased, fewer people felt domestic violence was justified. Another trend was shown when the respondent's education was plotted against the percentage of people who agreed that "a man is justified in hitting his wife if she goes out without telling him." As the level of education increased, the mean percentage who felt the above claim was justified, decreased.

In a similar survey the average education of both the respondent and her mother were taken into account. The evidence showed that as the respondent's mother's education increased, the percentage of respondents who felt that domestic violence was justified in certain situations decreased almost linearly. The article that explains these surveys concludes that this link may be because mothers who are more educated raise their children to reject domestic violence.

== Mental and physical health ==
Domestic violence also affects mental health. A study by the World Health Organization in 2008 found that women who have reported being a victim of partner violence also reported a higher likelihood of having feelings of distress, suicidal thoughts, and suicidal attempts than women who had not experienced violence. Additionally, drug and alcohol abuse, depression and anxiety are all increased in domestic violence victims. Specifically among women, domestic violence decreases self worth, security, and dignity. An interview based study in 1998 showed that women who had reported experiencing violence had "significantly more diagnosis of phobias than women who reported no abuse." Out of the women in the study who tested positive for lifetime PTSD related to any stressful event in their life, 30.6% reported adult abuse.

A study showed that the strongest risk factor for domestic violence was being physically abused as a child. Many victims of domestic violence may also be perpetrators. This study also found a correlation between intimate partner violence (IPV) and the development of chronic illnesses (both mental and physical) in both men and women. Other physical outcomes of domestic violence include a higher likelihood of developing irritable bowel syndrome, gastrointestinal disorders, and chronic pelvic pain. Complications of pregnancy, risk of sexually transmitted infections, and risk of unwanted pregnancies also increase as a result of domestic violence. Coker's study also found that if intimate partner violence is exposed early, interventions can be put into place to minimize the long term negative health effects.

== Responses ==
=== Government ===
The scholar Patricia Kameri-Mbote wrote that the Constitution of Kenya states that men women and children have the right to "life, liberty, and security of the person and his/her protection from the law." While the constitution provides both men and women protection from "inhuman treatment or torture", it does not explicitly provide protection from violence against women and girls. The Kenyan Penal Code also has provisions that are used to protect against domestic violence. Under a section called "Sexual Offenses", three kinds of "rape" are prohibited against. However, the language used in this provision has lent itself to many loopholes. Under another section labeled "Defilement", it is written that extreme punishment will be used for men who rape women under the age of 14 or a girl that "was an idiot or imbecile". For married women, protection from rape is almost nonexistent, especially if the marriage is considered valid under the law. Due to the fact that Kenya does not have a minimum age for marriage, the issue of age for consent of sexual relationship is often unclear.

In many countries, the law enforcement does not act in cases of domestic violence because the severity of the violence is undermined and seen as a "domestic quarrel." As Lenore E. Walker writes in "Psychology and Domestic Violence Around the World", many believe that "an arrest and incarceration" is the most successful way to end the violence. However, others are of the opinion that in situations where the man does not have good community relations or many social ties, intervention by law enforcement can actually increase violence.

=== Social responses ===
Social efforts to reduce the domestic violence prevalence in Kenya include programs to increase gender-based violence recovery programs. In 2012, Rebecca Njuki et al. discussed how aid voucher programs are increasing with the goal of providing vouchers to victims for a specific health purpose. In this system, vouchers are given to victims of abuse that can be used for medical examinations, counseling services, and links to support groups which often provide legal assistance and referrals to shelters. Qualifications in violence recovery are available.

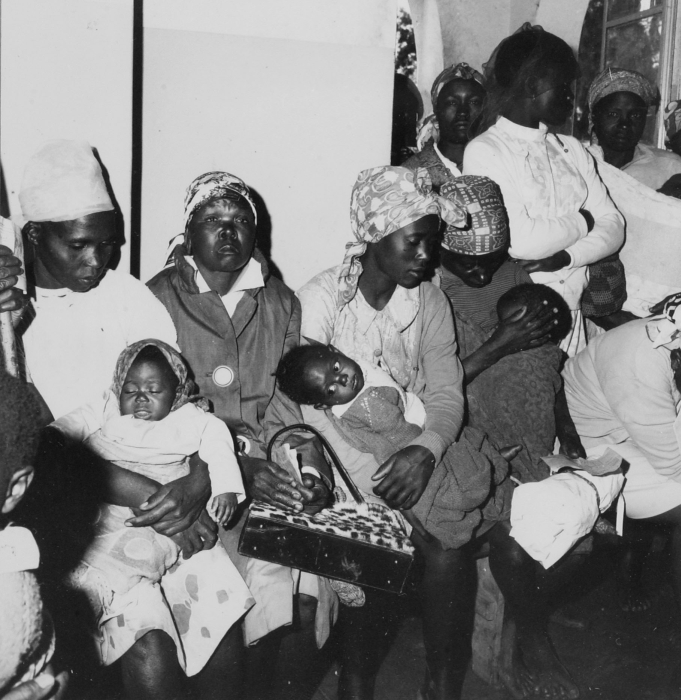
Women waiting for health services in the Great Rift Valley, Kenya

In 2002, a study showed that the healthcare system is the most efficient way to find victims of domestic violence. However, research has shown that many healthcare professionals are not trained to identify signs of domestic violence. In a study using focus groups of both male and female nurses and asked them what they deemed as domestic violence. The males frequently described occurrences of violence as "discipline" or "punishment". When victims are identified, they "have often been treated insensitively and had their abuse minimized or ignored, with healthcare workers tending to focus on physical injuries while subtly blaming women for their abuse".

A program was implemented in 2013 to decrease domestic violence towards pregnant women. This program was started in rural Kenya and provided clinical assistance, referrals, and emotional support to victims of domestic abuse. A 40-hour training session was mandated for all clinicians, and community partners (religious, social, traditional) were educated on domestic violence and its effects. Women were tested for HIV, educated in mother-to-child transmission interventions, and provided with transportation in case a referral was needed. 134 women were studied during a 5-month period. Results of this study showed that the community benefited greatly from this program, as victims knew where to go for medical assistance, perpetrators knew they would be held liable for their actions, and health workers became empowered and confident in their abilities to help victims. A study by Ann L. Coker also concluded that specific screening for domestic violence should be implemented for all women, and that special attention should be given to screening for physical and sexual abuse.
