= Scientists Under Attack: Genetic Engineering in the Magnetic Field of Money =

- Film poster
- German: Gekaufte Wahrheit – Gentechnik im Magnetfeld des Geldes
- Directed by: Bertram Verhaag
- Written by: Bertram Verhaag
- Produced by: Bertram Verhaag
- Edited by: Verena Schönauer
- Music by: Gert Wilden Jr.
- Production company: Denkmal Film
- Distributed by: Denkmal Film, BR
- Release date: November 2009 (IDFA)
- Running time: 88 minutes
- Country: Germany
- Languages: English, German

Scientists Under Attack: Genetic Engineering in the Magnetic Field of Money (German: Gekaufte Wahrheit – Gentechnik im Magnetfeld des Geldes) is a 2009 German documentary film by Bertram Verhaag. It alleges that the biotechnology industry was implicit in ruining the careers of Árpád Pusztai and Ignacio Chapela when they published research critical of genetic engineering.

The film premiered at the 2009 International Documentary Film Festival Amsterdam.

== Synopsis ==
The 2009 documentary interviewed three scientists (Árpád Pusztai, Nina Fedoroff and Ignacio Chapela) and an attorney (Andrew Kimbrell). Pusztai was a biochemist who went to the media with unpublished research claiming that a type of genetically modified potato suppressed the immune system and stunted growth when fed to rats. The resulting controversy led to him being fired from the Rowett Institute. Fedoroff is a highly decorated molecular biologist who is an external adviser to the US Department of State. Chapela is a professor at the University of Berkeley and Kimbrell is the executive director of the Center for Food Safety who sued the FDA in 1998 over its regulation of GM foods.

== Reception ==
The German ARD cultural magazine "titel thesen temperamente" broadcast a 6-minute review about the film. The Bayerischer Rundfunk described the film as committed, partisan and disputatious. KinoZeit calls it an ambitious documentary.

== International awards ==
The documentary received 8 international prizes, including three for best documentary. It won 1st prize at Indie Fest 2010 in the feature documentary category.
