= Anya potato =

Potato variety

Anya
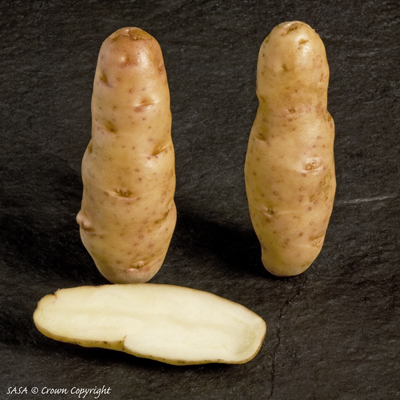
- Species: Solanum tuberosum
- Cultivar: 'Anya'
- Origin: Scottish Crop Research Institute, Scotland, 1996

Anya is a variety of potato that was bred at the Scottish Crop Research Institute, which has rights over the variety which expire in 2026.

Anya is a cross between the varieties Désirée and Pink Fir Apple, and it was named after Lady Sainsbury, and as of 2024 they were exclusively available commercially from Sainsbury's supermarkets.

This type of finger potato has a long knobbly oval shape, a pinkish beige coloured skin, and white waxy flesh. Its flavour is slightly nutty. The Anya potato is a good boiling potato but can be prepared using most cooking methods. It is particularly suitable for salads.
