= Rachel Carson Prize =

Rachel Carson Prize may refer to any of three prizes and awards named after environmentalist Rachel Carson:

- Rachel Carson Prize (academic book prize), an American academic book prize
- Rachel Carson Prize (environmentalist award), a Norwegian prize for female environmentalists
- Rachel Carson Award, an award honoring women environmentalists
