= David Baker (activist) =

Alabama Civil Rights Activist

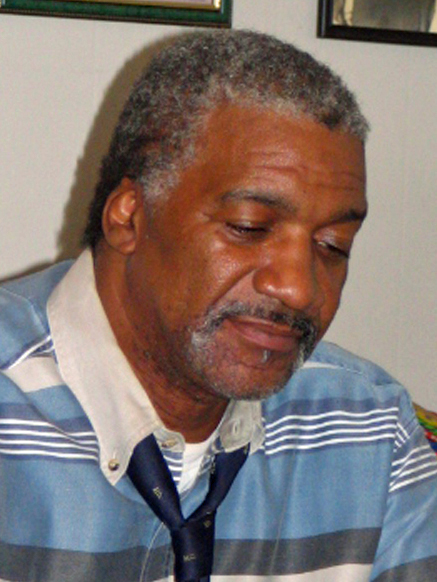
- David Baker
- Born: David Barney Baker; September 1, 1951; Anniston, Calhoun County, Alabama, U.S.A.
- Died: July 13, 2026 (aged 74); Anniston, Calhoun County, Alabama, U.S.A.
- Occupations: Environmental Justice Activist, Civil Rights Activist
- Known for: Nationally recognized for Environmental Justice Activism, CEO/Founder Of The Anniston-based Non-Profit, Community Against Pollution (CAP)

David B. Baker was an American activist. A former union organizer, Baker was the founder and director of Community Against Pollution.

== Background ==
Baker was from Anniston, Alabama. As children, he and his younger brother Terry would play in ditches and cross the water in the ditches that were used for the Monsanto plant run-off.

In 1970 his brother died of brain and lung cancer at the age of 17. Baker believes that this was caused by PCBs in the environment. Since then he was instrumental in getting lawyers to represent the people who appear to be the victims of PCB poisoning.

In 1995 while he was working for an environmental company, he accidentally discovered that the presence of PCB's had been covered up for 50 years.

== Recent & current ==
He was the founder and Executive Director of the organization Community Against Pollution.

He was also active in the organisation of a team of workers going to help in the clean-up of the Gulf of Mexico oil spill.

Baker died on July 13, 2026 in Anniston, Alabama at the age of 74.

== Organization membership ==
- Community Against Pollution (Founder / Director)
- Environmental Working Group (Board of Directors)
- Coalition of Black Trade Unionists (Member)
- Calhoun County Chapter of the NAACP (Vice-President)

== Video ==
- The GMWatch video collection ... (Contributor)
- The World According to Monsanto ... (Himself)

== Awards ==
- EPA 1st Assistant Administrator's Environmental Justice Incentive Award 2003
- CARAT Team Award
