= Marie-Monique Robin =

French TV journalist and documentary filmmaker

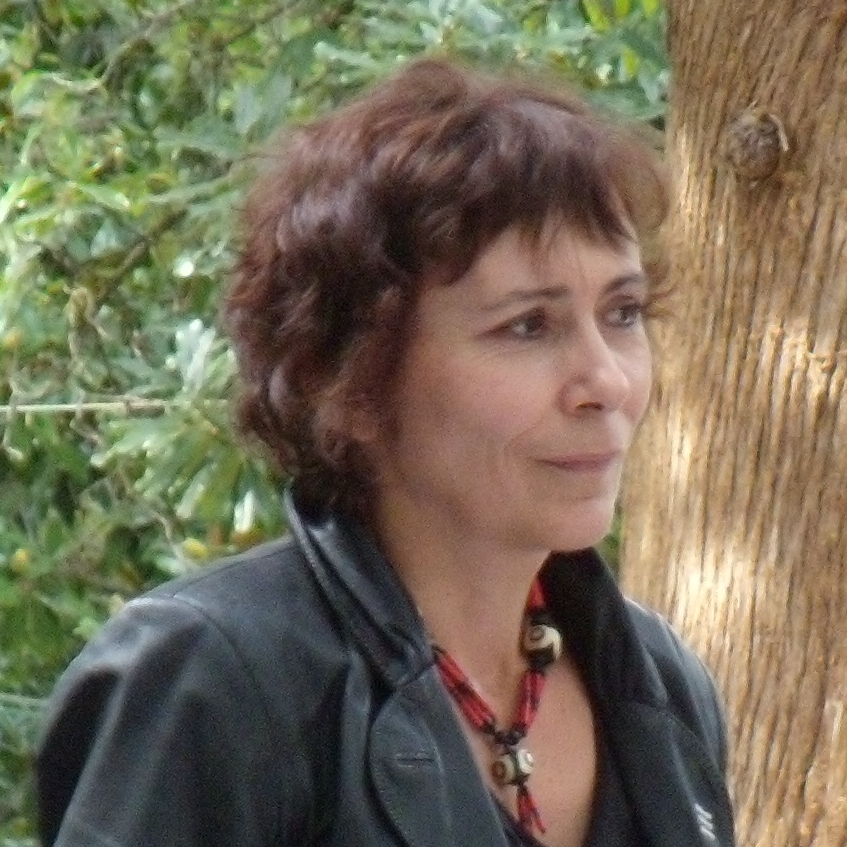
- Marie-Monique Robin in 2009
- Born: 15 June 1960 (age 66); Gourgé, Poitou-Charentes, France
- Occupations: TV journalist and documentary filmmaker

Marie-Monique Robin (French pronunciation: [maʁi mɔnik ʁɔbɛ̃]; born 15 June 1960, Poitou-Charentes) is a French TV journalist and documentary filmmaker. She generally issues books and documentary films together on the topics she investigates, in order to make more people aware of the issues she studies.

Her work has been recognized by numerous awards: the 1995 Albert Londres Prize for Voleurs d'yeux (1994), an exposé about organ theft; best political documentary award from the French Senate for Escadrons de la mort, l'école française (2003), her film about France's transfer of counter-insurgency techniques (including torture) to Argentina; and the Rachel Carson Prize for Le monde selon Monsanto (2008), her film on Monsanto and challenges to the environment from its products, including GMOs.

== Early life ==
Marie-Monique Robin was born in 1960 and grew up in the Deux-Sèvres, where her parents were farmers. She studied political science at the University of Saarbrücken and graduated from university teaching journalism center of the University of Strasbourg.

== Career ==
After studying journalism in Strasbourg, she worked with France 3 for a time. Robin went to Nicaragua and worked in South America as a freelance reporter. She traveled to South America more than 80 times, including 30 times to Cuba. She reported on the Colombian guerrillas, and later worked for CAPA news agency.

== Voleurs d'yeux ==
Voleurs d'yeux (Eye Thieves), 1994, was the name of a book and a film based on it, related to her investigations of organ theft. After her film was shown at the United Nations, the USIA spokesman said that it was a lie. She was subjected to various pressures and personal attacks, but the following year in 1995, she was awarded the Albert-Londres prize for her film. However, the concession was suspended while the jury studied allegations of falsehoods after French physicians discovered that one of the children whose corneas the film said has been stolen still had them. After months of discussions, the commission decided to ratify the concession because they didn't find "bad faith".

Marie-Monique Robin subsequently left CAPA to work freelance. She is doing a report on Cuba for Thalassa, a French television program. Another project is exploring the rise in false allegations of pedophilia being made against teachers.

== Escadrons de la mort, l'école française ==
Robin made a 2003 film documentary titled Escadrons de la mort, l'école française (The Death Squads: The French School) that investigated the little-known ties between the French secret services and their Argentine and Chilean counterparts. (The next year she published a book on the same topic.) Specifically, she documented that the French transferred to Argentina counter-insurgency tactics which they had developed and used during the Algerian War (1954–62), including extensive use of torture and disappearances. The security forces later used them during the Dirty War (1976–1983) and for Operation Condor. She received an award in 2003 for the "best political documentary of the year" by the French Senate, in recognition of this work. Robin said in an August 2003 interview in L'Humanité:

[the] French have systematized a military technique in urban environment which would be copied and pasted to Latin American dictatorships.

While J. Patrice McSherry noted that the United States had also taught Argentine and other Latin American military officers, and had a larger role in Operation Condor, he said that Robin "succeeds exceptionally well" in illuminating the lesser known French connection. People in Argentina were outraged when they saw the 2003 film, which included three generals defending their actions during the Dirty War. Due to public pressure, "President Néstor Kirchner ordered the military to bring charges against the three for justifying the crimes of the dictatorship." They were Albano Hargindeguy, Reynaldo Bignone, and Ramón Díaz Bessone.

Her associated book on the death squads was published in 2004. Robin expanded on her discussion of how the French military officials had taught Argentine counterparts counter-insurgency tactics, including the systematic use of torture as they had used it during the Algerian War. She documented a 1959 agreement between Paris and Buenos Aires that created a "permanent French military mission" in Argentina, formed of French veterans of the Algerian War (1954–62). The mission was located in the offices of the chief of staff of the Argentine Army. Roger Trinquier was a French theorist of counter-insurgency who legitimized the use of torture. His noted book on counter-insurgency, Modern Warfare: A French View of Counterinsurgency, had a strong influence in South America and elsewhere, including in the School of the Americas. Trinquier was a member of the Cité catholique fundamentalist group. It recruited many former members of the OAS pro-"French Algeria" terrorist group and opened a subsidiary in Argentina near the end of the 1950s. It had an important role in teaching ESMA Navy officers counter-insurgency techniques, including the systematic use of torture and ideological support.

In a related issue that Robin documented, Manuel Contreras, the head of Dirección de Inteligencia Nacional (DINA) had told her that the Direction de surveillance du territoire (DST) French intelligence agency had given Chilean secret police the names of refugees in exile in France, and those who had returned to Chile from France (Operation Retorno). The Chileans who returned were killed, but France prevented CONDOR assassination of Chilean exiles on its soil. In an interview Robin said that her findings meant that the French government, and Giscard d'Estaing, then President of the Republic, were responsible for the deaths of people in Chile. She said, "I was very shocked by the duplicity of the French diplomatic position which, on one hand, received with open arms the political refugees, and, on the other hand, collaborated with the dictatorships."

General Paul Aussaresses also taught the US Army these tactics. Its forces used torture and interrogation during the Vietnam War in the Phoenix Program, through which an estimated 20,000 civilians were killed.

Citing Roger Faligot, a French journalist and expert on Ireland, Marie-Monique Robin also noted that General Frank Kitson's book, Low Intensity Operations: Subversion, Insurgency and Peacekeeping, had become the "Bible" used by the British Army during The Troubles in Northern Ireland and that it quoted heavily from Trinquier.

=== Algerian Civil War ===
At the conclusion of her book on the death squads, Robin cites the 2003 report, Algérie, la machine de mort, by Algeria-Watch, which said that Algerian military leaders during the civil war used techniques introduced by the French during the war for independence. She wrote:

To conserve their power and their fortunes nurtured by corruption, those who have been called the généraux janviéristes (Generals of January) — Generals Larbi Belkheir, Khaled Nezzar, Mohamed Lamari, Mohamed Mediène, Smaïl Lamari, Kamal Abderrahmane and several others — did not hesitate in triggering against their people a savage repression, using, at an unprecedented scale in the history of civil wars of the second half of the 20th century, the "secret war" techniques theorized by certain French officers during the Algerian War for Independence, from 1954 to 1962: death squads, systemic torture, kidnapping and disappearances, manipulation of the violence of opponents, disinformation and "psychological action, etc.

Citing Lounis Aggoun and Jean-Baptiste Rivoire, Françalgérie. Crimes et mensonges d'État (2004), Marie-Monique Robin refers to false flag attacks committed by Algerian death squads. These were formed by secret agents disguised as Islamist terrorists, including the OJAL created by the DRS security services and the OSSRA (Organisation secrète de sauvegarde de la République algérienne, Secret Organisation of Safeguard of the Algerian Republic). She said such actions recalled "the French Main rouge", a terrorist group during the 1960s which may have been constituted by French secret services, "or the Argentine Triple A":

After having liquidated dozens of opponents, posing as anti-Islamist civilians, these pseudo-organisations disappeared in mid-1994. Because at the same moment, the leaders of the DRS chose the widespread deployment and action of death squads also composed of their men, but posing as Islamist terrorists.

=== The Battle of Algiers ===
In 1997, Robin interviewed two Argentine navy cadets from the ESMA, noted as a center of counter-insurgency during the Dirty War. They said they had been shown The Battle of Algiers (1966), the film by Gillo Pontecorvo, at the military school. When the film was first released, several years after the end of the Algerian War, it had been censored in France for its portrayal of the French effort, showing the use of torture and other abuses.

The cadets said the screening was introduced by Antonio Caggiano, archbishop of Buenos Aires from 1959 to 1975, when President Arturo Frondizi had inaugurated the first course on counter-revolutionary warfare at the Higher Military College. Caggiano, the military chaplain at the school in 1997, had introduced The Battle of Algiers approvingly and added a religiously oriented commentary. Anibal Acosta, one of the cadets interviewed by Robin, described the session:

They showed us that film to prepare us for a kind of war very different from the regular war we had entered the Navy School for. They were preparing us for police missions against the civilian population, who became our new enemy.

Robin noted that United States Pentagon officials involved in "special operations" viewed Pontecorvo's film on 27 August 2003. This was several months after the US had invaded Iraq, and it was encountering rising insurgency in Baghdad and other areas.

=== Official responses to Robin's film ===
After seeing Robin's film, on 10 September 2003 French Green Party deputies Noël Mamère, Martine Billard and Yves Cochet formally requested that a parliamentary commission be established on the "role of France in the support of military regimes in Latin America from 1973 to 1984" before the Foreign Affairs Commission of the National Assembly. Apart from coverage by Le Monde, newspapers in France were silent about this request.

Deputy Roland Blum, in charge of the commission, refused to allow Robin to testify. In December 2003 the Commission published a 12-page report, claiming that no agreement had been signed between France and Argentina or other Latin American countries. She criticized the commission's report for its gaps, as she had found the document at the Quai d'Orsay.

When Minister of Foreign Affairs Dominique de Villepin traveled to Chile in February 2004, he said that no cooperation between France and the military regimes had occurred.

== Le monde selon Monsanto (The World According to Monsanto) ==
In March 2008, her documentary about the Monsanto Company, The World According to Monsanto, was aired on the Arte network in France and Germany. It was a co-production of Arte and the National Film Board of Canada.

The movie explores Monsanto, the major United States chemical manufacturing firm based in St. Louis, Missouri. With offices and plants in 46 countries, Monsanto has become the world leader in GMO (genetically modified organisms). The firm also has produced PCBs (such as pyralene), herbicides (such as Agent Orange during the Malayan Emergency and the Vietnam War), and the recombinant bovine growth hormone (rBGH), used to increase milk production in cows. Europe has prohibited the use of rBGH in its dairy cattle and milk production.

The documentary explains that Monsanto has been the subject of numerous lawsuits for environmental contamination since the late 20th century. It promotes itself today as a "life sciences" company, committed to sustainable development. In her study, Robin suggests that Monsanto made efforts to win support in the sciences and regulatory spheres in order to sell its GMOs internationally. Translated into 16 languages, the movie and her related book have found wide international audiences. In France the documentary was released at a time when the debate about GMOs divided the political class and researchers; the majority of residents was opposed to their use.

This film earned the following awards: the Rachel Carson Prize (Norway), the Umwelt-Medienpreis prize (Germany), and the Ekofilm Festival of Cesky Kumlov (Czech Republic, 2009).

== Torture Made in USA ==
Torture Made in USA is a documentary by Marie-Monique Robin released in 2009. It relates to information reported on torture in Afghanistan, Iraq and Guantanamo.

== Our Daily Poison ==
Robin's book Our Daily Poison (2011) is the result of a two-year investigation of the toxins in the food chain in ten countries, a thorough examination of industrial chemicals in the food chain revealing a large increase in rates of cancer, neurodegenerative diseases, reproductive disorders, and diabetes caused by the toxins. It documents the many ways in which we encounter a variety of chemicals in our everyday lives—from the pesticides that blanket our crops to the additives and plastics that contaminate our food—and their effects over time.

== Crops of the Future ==
On October 16, 2012, on World Food Day, her film Crops of the Future - How to feed the world in 2050? was shown on Arte a Franco/German TV channel. It describes farmer-led alternatives for food, farming and land use. It is her third work in a film-book trilogy on foods (after The World According to Monsanto in 2008 and Our Daily Poison in 2011).

== Sacrée Croissance! ==
Her documentary Sacrée Croissance! (2014), known as Sacred Growth! (or Damned Growth) in English, was aired by French-German channel Arte. It explores western cultures' emphasis on continual growth and expansion of economies, and the alternatives being explored for sustainability.

== See also ==
- Monsanto
- Genetically modified food controversies

== Bibliography ==
- Voleurs d’organes. Enquête sur un trafic, Éditions Bayard.
- Escadrons de la mort, l'école française, de Marie-Monique Robin. 453 pages. La Découverte (15 September 2004). Collection : Cahiers libres. (ISBN 2707141631)
- Los Escuadrones De La Muerte / The Death Squads, de Marie-Monique Robin. 539 pages. Sudamericana (October 2005). (ISBN 950072684X) (Presentation)
- Les 100 photos du siècle (Le Chêne/Taschen)
- Le sixième sens, science et paranormal (Le Chêne).
- Le Monde selon Monsanto, coédition ARTE éditions / La Découverte 2008 (ISBN 9782847344660). (Presentation)
