= Ignacio Chapela =

Ignacio Chapela (born 1959) is a microbial ecologist and mycologist at the University of California, Berkeley. He is best known for a 2001 paper in Nature on the flow of transgenes into wild maize populations, as an outspoken critic of the University of California's ties to the biotechnology industry, as well as a later dispute with the University over denial of tenure that Chapela argued was politically motivated. Chapela is also notable for his work with natural resources and indigenous rights.

== Mycological research ==
In the late 1980s, Chapela completed his PhD dissertation research at Cardiff University on the ecology of microbial wood-rotting fungi. He continued research on a number of areas of fungal ecology through the 1990s, as a visiting scholar at various research institutions, private companies, and NGOs, finally settling at UC Berkeley, where he has been on the faculty the Department of Environmental Sciences, Policy, and Management (ESPM) since 1996.

He has worked on the symbiosis between leafcutter ants and their cultivated fungi. His research seems to indicate that some leaf-cutter ants have "domesticated" a single lineage of fungi for over 30 million years; Chapela is currently studying this symbiosis from evolutionary and agricultural perspectives, as well as looking for ways to manipulate it.

== Transgene research ==
Chapela was co-author (with his graduate student, David Quist) of a controversial 2001 Nature paper about the flow of transgenes into wild Zea mays ssp. mexicana in mountains of Oaxaca in Southwestern Mexico -a culturally significant region known as the Mesoamerican center of origin for Zea mays L. Controversy over the accuracy of the claims and methodological concerns about the paper led to an editor's note saying there was insufficient evidence to justify the original publication. Advocates of GM crops widely, and erroneously, called this a retraction.

In 2002 and 2003 a research team had two commercial American companies test 153,000 seeds from 870 maize plants in 125 fields in Oaxaca - the same area Chapela and Quist sampled - for transgenic DNA material. In their article published on August 8, 2005 in the Proceedings of the National Academy of Sciences (PNAS) they reported that no (transgenic DNA) was found. However, a more recent study published in the February 2009 issue of Molecular Ecology confirmed the presence of transgenic DNA in Mexican maize. The study, however, did not confirm an important conclusion from the 2001 Nature paper, namely, that the transgene-contaminated corn has replicated. Chapela is reported to have stated in response to the study, "It is good to see this...but it took seven years."

== Disputes with University of California ==
Chapela objected to an agreement in which the department and faculty of Plant and Microbial Biology at UC Berkeley took money from Novartis in exchange for a degree of publication scrutiny and trade secrecy, taking a strong position on the issue.

Chapela was initially denied tenure at UC Berkeley in 2003, despite a unanimous vote in his favor by an ad hoc tenure committee. Supporters claim that this stems from opposition to Chapela's anti-Novartis activism from Molecular and Cell Biology faculty member Jasper Rine, who was both a member of the tenure committee and in a research relationship with the company. However, Chapela was ultimately awarded tenure in 2005.

Chapela has also spoken out against the deal between UC Berkeley, University of Illinois, Urbana-Champaign, and British Petroleum to research the development of biofuels, which may involve genetically engineering microorganisms and plants. The grant went into effect in 2007. The case is detailed in the German documentary Scientists Under Attack: Genetic Engineering in the Magnetic Field of Money.

== Activism ==
Chapela founded The Mycological Facility in Oaxaca state, a facility dealing with questions of natural resources and indigenous rights, and collaborates with indigenous communities in Mexico, Costa Rica, and Ecuador on issues of rights to genetic resources. He is also an advisory board member for The Sunshine Project, an organization promoting citizens' concerns with biosafety and biowarfare.

He has appeared in several films on genetically modified organism and food systems issues, The World According to Monsanto, Symphony of the Soil, and The Future of Food.

== See also ==
List of mycologists
