= Árpád Pusztai =

Hungarian-born British biochemist (1930–2021)

Árpád János Pusztai (8 September 1930 – 17 December 2021) was a Hungarian-born British biochemist and nutritionist who spent 36 years at the Rowett Research Institute in Aberdeen, Scotland. He was a world expert on plant lectins, authoring 270 papers and three books on the subject.

In 1998, Árpád Pusztai publicly announced that the results of his research showed feeding genetically modified potatoes to rats had negative effects on their stomach lining and immune system. This led to scientific criticism. Pusztai was suspended and his annual contract was not renewed. The resulting controversy became known as the Pusztai affair.

== Life and career ==
Pusztai was born in Budapest, Hungary, on 8 September 1930. He was a student of the high school Óbudai Árpád Gimnázium and later obtained a diploma in chemistry in 1953 from the Eötvös Loránd University in Budapest. He worked for three years as an associate scientist at the Hungarian Academy of Sciences before the Hungarian revolution against Soviet control in 1956. After the failed revolution, Pusztai escaped to a refugee camp in Austria and from there made his way to England. He completed his doctorate in biochemistry at the Lister Institute in London and continued there with his post-doctorate. In 1963, he was invited to join the Protein Research Department at the Rowett Research Institute in Aberdeen, Scotland. Pusztai worked at the Rowett Institute for the next 36 years, predominately studying plant lectins. During that time, he discovered glycoproteins in plants, authored over 270 research papers, published 3 books, and was considered an "internationally renowned expert on lectins". He was made a Fellow of the Royal Society of Edinburgh in 1988 and has received fellowships from the Leverhulme Trust. Árpád Pusztai was married to Dr Susan Bardócz, with whom he worked at the Rowett Institute. He had two daughters from his first marriage and a stepson from his marriage to Dr. Bardócz. He died at his home in Aberdeen on 17 December 2021, at the age of 91.

== Pusztai affair ==
In 1995, Pusztai began research on genetically modified potatoes containing the GNA lectin gene from the snowdrop plant. His research team fed raw and cooked genetically modified potatoes to rats, using Desiree Red potatoes as controls. In 1998, Pusztai said in an interview on a World in Action programme that his group had observed damage to the intestines and immune systems of rats fed the genetically modified potatoes. He also said, "If I had the choice, I would certainly not eat it," and "I find it's very unfair to use our fellow citizens as guinea pigs."

This resulted in a media frenzy, and the director of the Rowett Institute, Philip James, after initially supporting Pusztai, suspended him and banned both him and Susan Bardocz from speaking publicly. He also used misconduct procedures to seize the raw data. The Rowett Institute eventually published an audit criticizing Pusztai's results and sent the raw data to six anonymous reviewers, who also criticized Pusztai's work. Pusztai sent the audit report and his rebuttal to scientists who requested it, and in February 1999, twenty-one European and American scientists released a memo supporting Pusztai.

James and the Rowett Institute released a statement on 10 August falsely accusing Pusztai of using a lectin (Concanavalin A) that was a known toxin. This wasn't true. Pusztai had used the snowdrop lectin, but a gag order prevented him from defending himself publicly until 1999.

Pusztai's experiment was eventually published as a letter in The Lancet in 1999. Because of the controversial nature of his research, the letter was reviewed by six reviewers – three times the usual number. One publicly opposed the letter, another thought it was flawed, but wanted it published "to avoid suspicions of a conspiracy against Pusztai and to give colleagues a chance to see the data for themselves," while the other four raised questions that were addressed by the authors. The letter reported significant differences between the thickness of the gut epithelium of rats fed genetically modified potatoes and of rats fed the control diet.

The Royal Society of Medicine declared that the study 'is flawed in many aspects of design, execution and analysis' and that 'no conclusions should be drawn from it'. For example, too few rats per test group were used to derive meaningful, statistically significant data.

He was one of several scientists interviewed in the 2010 documentary Scientists Under Attack: Genetic Engineering in the Magnetic Field of Money who, based on their findings, have criticized the use of genetic modification for food.

== Aftermath ==
Pusztai's annual contract at Rowett was not renewed following the incident and he moved back to Hungary. He gave lectures on his GE potato work and on claimed dangers in general of genetic engineering of crop plants. In 2005, he received the Whistleblower Award of the Federation of German Scientists and the German section of the International Association of Lawyers against Nuclear Arms (IALANA). In 2009, Pusztai and his wife, Prof. Bardócz Zsuzsa, received the Stuttgart Peace Prize.

== See also ==
- Genetically modified food controversies
- List of whistleblowers
