= Pusztai affair =

Controversy in genetic engineering

The Pusztai affair is a controversy that began in 1998. The protein scientist Árpád Pusztai went public with the initial results of unpublished research he was conducting at the Rowett Institute in Aberdeen, Scotland, investigating the possible effects of genetically modified potatoes upon rats. Pusztai claimed that the genetically modified potatoes had stunted growth and repressed the rats' immune systems while thickening their gut mucosa. Initially supported by the Rowett Institute, his comments on a British television program caused a storm of controversy, and the Rowett Institute withdrew its support. Pusztai was suspended and misconduct procedures were used to seize his data and ban him from speaking publicly. The institute did not renew his annual contract, and Pusztai was criticized by the Royal Society and some other scientists for making an announcement before his experiment was complete or peer-reviewed and for the experiment's design, methodology and analysis. Some of the data from the study was eventually published in The Lancet in 1999 after five out of six peer reviewers approved of the study – triggering further controversy.

== Background ==
Before 1995, no peer-reviewed studies had been published investigating the safety of genetically modified food using human or animal feeding trials. In 1995 the Scottish Agriculture Environment and Fisheries Department commissioned a £1.6 million three-year research study to assess the safety of genetically engineered Desiree Red potatoes. The potatoes had been developed by biochemist John Gatehouse at Cambridge Agricultural Genetics (later renamed Axis Genetics) and had recently completed two years of field trials at Rothamsted Experimental Station. The GNA gene from the Galanthus (snowdrop) plant was inserted into the potato, allowing the GNA lectin protein to be synthesised. This lectin has been shown to be toxic to some insects. (Further research along the same lines - inserting further antifeedant-producing genes - was performed over the next few years. This was the work of a Durham/Axis team: At University of Durham, Gatehouse, his wife Angharad and others; and Axis; and a few others.)

Twenty-eight studies were proposed, of which eight were selected for peer review by the Biotechnology and Biological Sciences Research Council. From these eight the Rowett Research Institute's proposal was chosen and a combined team of academics from the Scottish Crop Research Institute, the Durham University Department of Biology and the Rowett Institute was assembled, and coordinated by Pusztai.

Although the tested potatoes were not a commercial variety and not intended for human consumption a contract was signed with Cambridge Agricultural Genetics, which included a profit-sharing agreement, if potatoes developed using this technology were approved and released commercially. In earlier ten-day feeding trials on GNA-fed rats, Pusztai concluded that they did not significantly affect growth, despite some hypertrophy of the small intestine and a slight decrease of gut enzyme activity.

== Experiment ==
The experimental potatoes had been transformed with the Galanthus nivalis agglutinin (GNA) gene from the Galanthus (snowdrop) plant, allowing the GNA lectin protein to be synthesised. This lectin is toxic to some insects. Rats were fed raw and cooked genetically modified potatoes, using unmodified Desiree Red potatoes as controls. One control group ate an unmodified Desiree Red potato spiked with the GNA snowdrop lectin. Twelve feeding experiments were conducted, ten short-term (10 days) and two long-term (110 days). Before the experiment Pusztai and his team said they expected no differences between the rats fed modified potatoes and rats fed the non-modified ones.

The potatoes were chosen because they were deemed substantially equivalent to non-genetically modified Desiree Red potatoes. The study used two transgenic lines of potato, both with the GNA gene inserted. They were grown in the same conditions as the non-genetically modified parent plant. According to Pusztai, the potatoes were not substantially equivalent, as one of the transgenic lines contained 20 percent less protein than the other, and the starch and sugar contents varied by up to 20 percent among the three lines. Pusztai claimed that these differences were reason enough to discontinue further experimentation.

Their experiment showed a statistically significant difference in the thickness of the stomach mucosa. The mucosa of rats fed raw or cooked potato modified with the GNA gene was thicker than that of rats fed the unmodified potato. The crypt length in the jejunum was greater on rats fed the raw modified potato, although there was no statistical difference observed in the rats fed the cooked potato. As these effects were not observed in rats fed the control potatoes spiked with GNA, Pusztai concluded that the differences were a result of the transformation procedure, rather than the presence of GNA. Pusztai's collaborator Stanley Ewen said that the cauliflower mosaic virus used as a promoter could likely be the cause of the observed changes.

== Announcement ==
On June 22, 1998, Pusztai revealed his research findings during an interview on Granada Television's current affairs programme World in Action titled "Eat up your genes". He was given permission to do the interview by Rowett Institute Director Philip James. Rowett's press officer was present at the start of filming. During the interview Pusztai said he had "concerns that some of the testing techniques are not up to what we thought it was necessary to do, and therefore we should have more testing." When asked why he felt concerned, he said "it was because we had done some experiments which made us feel concerned" and discussed his results in general terms.

Pusztai later said that at the time of the interview he was not sure if he should reveal results from experiments that had not been completed and did not think the programme would be hostile toward genetically modified food. He estimated that the experiments were 99 percent complete when the interview was conducted. He said that the rats in his experiments suffered stunted growth and had suppressed immune systems and that more safety research was required. He also said, "If you gave me the choice now, I wouldn't eat it" and it was "very, very unfair to use our fellow citizens as guinea pigs".

== Reaction ==
World in Action issued a press release the day before the broadcast, stimulating numerous phone calls to Pusztai and the institute from government, industrial, non-governmental and media organisations. James says he was dismayed that unpublished data had been released and withdrew Pusztai from any further media commitments that morning. He eventually suspended Pusztai, used misconduct procedures to seize his data, banned him from speaking publicly and did not renew his annual contract.

Confusion reigned over just what experiments had been conducted. Pusztai had mentioned two lines of genetically modified potatoes, meaning the two GNA lines, and this was reported by the media. The Rowett institute mistakenly assumed the media was talking about a second line transformed with concanavalin A (ConA), a Jack Bean lectin that is toxic to mammals. Transgenic ConA Potatoes had been developed, but had never been tested. Two press releases issued by the Rowett Institute on the 10th and 11th praised Pusztai's research and supported increased safety tests on genetically modified food. The press releases also said that the potatoes were modified with ConA, adding to the confusion. Pusztai claimed that he had not seen the press releases before they went out and had no opportunity to correct the mistake. James says that he drafted it and Pusztai rewrote one section, but did not see the final copy. The mistaken belief that the ConA gene was inserted into the potato led scientist Sir Robert May and Agricultural Minister Jack Cunningham to release statements to the media saying that the findings were not surprising, as a known poison had been added to the potato. Some scientists still dismiss Pusztai's work over this error.

=== Audit ===
The Rowett Institute audited Pusztai's work on 22 October 1998. It concluded that his data did not support his conclusions. In February 1999, 22 scientists from 13 countries, organised by Friends of the Earth, published a memo responding to the audit. It stated that their independent examination supported Pusztai's conclusions and that he should have been concerned by his findings.

=== Royal Society peer review ===
On 19 February the Royal Society publicly announced that a committee would review his work. World in Action reporters Laurie Flynn and Michael Sean Gillard claimed that this was an unusual step, as the Royal Society did not normally conduct peer reviews. The data were sent to six anonymous reviewers and the resulting review was published in June 1999. It stated that Pusztai's experiments were poorly designed, contained uncertainties in the composition of diets, tested too few rats, used incorrect statistical methods and lacked consistency within experiments. He responded by saying the reviewers had reviewed only internal Rowett reports, which did not include the design or methodology of the experiments.

=== Lancet response ===
The editors of The Lancet published an editorial in May 1999 in which they denounced all parties involved, criticizing Pusztai for "unwisely" announcing his results on television and stating that scientists should publish "results in the scientific press, not through the popular media"; the editorial also denounced the Royal Society's review as "breathtaking impertinence".

== Publication ==
The data were published as a letter in The Lancet in October 1999, co-authored by Ewen. It reported significant differences in the thickness of the gut epithelium of rats fed genetically modified potatoes (compared to those fed the control diet), but no differences in growth or immune system function were suggested.

The letter was reviewed by six reviewers – three times the Lancet's usual number. Four reviewers found it acceptable after revisions. A fifth thought it was flawed, but wanted it published "to avoid suspicions of a conspiracy against Pusztai and to give colleagues a chance to see the data for themselves". The sixth, John Pickett of the Institute of Arable Crops Research, also said it was flawed. After consulting with the Royal Society, Pickett publicly criticised The Lancet for agreeing to publish the study. The study, which used data held by Ewen, who was not subject to the veto of Pusztai's work, reported significant differences in thickness of the gut epithelium between control and test subjects, but did not mention growth or immunity problems.

The published work was criticised on the grounds that the unmodified potatoes were not a fair control diet and that any rats fed only potatoes would suffer from protein deficiency. Pusztai responded to these criticisms by saying that all the experimental diets had the same protein and energy content, and that the food intake of all rats was the same. In an interview, Pickett later said that Lancet editor Richard Horton must have had a political motive for publishing the paper because the referees had rejected it. According to Pusztai this claim was repeated by academic critics who assumed that Pickett's use of the plural suggested that the study had failed peer review.

Horton claimed that he had received a "very aggressive" phone call calling him "immoral" and threatening that if he published the paper it would "have implications for his personal position" as editor. Peter Lachmann, the former vice-president and biological secretary of the Royal Society and president of the Academy of Medical Sciences, acknowledged making the call but denies that he threatened Horton and says the call was to "discuss his error of judgment" in publishing the letter and to discuss the "moral difficulties about publishing bad science".

== Aftermath ==
Ewen retired following publication, claiming that his career options had been "blocked at a very high level".

A survey by the European Food Safety Authority GMO Panel Working Group on Animal Feeding Trials concluded: "Results obtained from testing GM food and feed in rodents indicate that large (at least 100-fold) 'safety' margins exist between animal exposure levels without observed adverse effects and estimated human daily intake. The studies did not show any biologically relevant differences in the parameters tested between control and test animals."

In 2005 Pusztai was given a whistleblower award from the Federation of German Scientists.

== See also ==
- Conspiracy theory
- Genetically modified food controversies
- Seralini affair
- Andrew Wakefield
