= Community Against Pollution =

Organization in Alabama, U.S.

- Founded: United States
- Type: Non-governmental organization
- Method: lobbying,
- Key people: David Baker

Community Against Pollution aka Citizens Against Pollution or (CAP) is an organization formed by the residents of Anniston, Alabama, in response to the effects of pollution.

== Background ==
During a period of around 36 years from 1935 to 1971, there were about five million pounds of PCBs produced and released. These ended up in landfill sites in the area, and around one million pounds contaminated local waterways and was embedded in sediments. The resident's health was also affected.

In 1998 David Baker founded CAP. With the organization's support residents sued chemical giant Monsanto over their health problems brought about by the company's pollution.

In 2002 Anniston was featured in an episode of 60 minutes; it was stated in the programme that the city was one of the most toxic in America.

== Action ==
As a result of CAP's efforts a lawsuit in Alabama was brought against Monsanto.
