= Enrico Pieri =

Italian man (1934–2021)

Enrico Pieri (19 April 1934 – 10 December 2021) was an Italian man who, as a child, survived a German massacre of Italian villagers during World War II, the Sant'Anna di Stazzema massacre. The child is depicted in Spike Lee's film Miracle at St. Anna and Pieri was present at the project's announcement in July 2007.

Pieri was awarded the Stuttgart peace prize in 2013.

Pieri died on 10 December 2021, at the age of 87.
