= Shiv Chopra =

Canadian microbiologist (1933–2018)

Shiv Darshan Lal Chopra (1933 – 7 January 2018), commonly known as Shiv Chopra, was a Canadian microbiologist and human rights activist. Chopra stood for food safety and testified before the Senate of Canada in defending the public from hormones, antibiotics, genetically modified organisms, rendered animal proteins, and pesticides.

Chopra was involved in one of the first major whistleblowing incidents in the Public Service of Canada. Chopra was also involved in the second systemic racial discrimination case in the Canadian public service, when it was found by a Canadian Human Rights Tribunal that his employer, Health Canada had discriminated against him on the basis of his race.

== Career ==
Born in Kapurthala, Punjab, India, Chopra studied veterinary medicine at Punjab University in Chandigarh, receiving the degree Bachelor of Veterinary Science & Animal husbandry in 1957. For graduate study he went to Indian Veterinary Research Institute at Izatnagar, obtaining in 1960 his diploma in the production and standardization of vaccines and sera. He relocated to Montreal, Quebec and studied microbiology at the Macdonald Campus of McGill University, obtaining a master's degree in 1962. His research induced enteritis by early weaning of piglets to obtain samples of e-coli for study. Chopra was awarded the Ph. D in 1964.

For 1965 the Medical Research Council of Canada granted him a fellowship to work with Bram Rose in the Division of Immunochemistry and Allergy at the Royal Victoria Hospital, Montreal. Subsequently, Miles Laboratories hired Chopra to direct its Biological Research Division in Stoke Poges, Buckinghamshire, England until 1969. He assisted in applications to regulatory agencies for new products. Chopra then returned to Canada where he worked with Health Canada, first as a senior scientific advisor in the Bureau of Drugs until 1987, and then in the Bureau of Veterinary Drugs until 2004.

In 1998 he became a member of the rBST gaps analysis team at Health Canada, investigating effects of bovine growth hormone in milk and human vulnerability to this molecule produced by genetic engineering. His opinion was that approval of this dairy enhancement was not warranted. He testified before the Committee on Agriculture and Forestry of the Senate of Canada 22 October 1998, 26 April 1999, and 3 May 1999.

In 2017, he appeared as an expert witness in a family law arbitration and set out the false view that children don't need the combination MMR vaccine against measles, mumps, and rubella (German measles). ~~This is untrue~~: the benefit of measles vaccination in preventing illness, disability, and death has been well documented. He also testified that HIV was caused by vaccines, ~~which is also untrue~~. The Superior Court later ruled that Chopra was unqualified to appear as an expert in vaccines, immunochemistry and microbiology.

Shiv Chopra died on 7 January 2018.

== Racial discrimination ==
In 1992 and 1993, Chopra initiated two human rights complaints against Health Canada, citing discrimination on the basis of race and national origin. On the basis of the ruling of the tribunal in March 1996, Health Canada was ordered to make a series of corrective measures over a five-year period. In August 2001, the tribunal rendered a second decision finding that Health Canada had discriminated against Chopra on the basis of his race, and specifically had altered job evaluations for Chopra in order to bolster its defense.

This was one of two major cases of systemic racial discrimination in the Canadian public service. In 1992 and 1994, the National Research Council of Canada, a government scientific agency, was found by the Canadian Human Rights Tribunal to have systemically discriminated against Chander Grover, an expert in optics and photonics, on the basis of race, colour and national origin.

== Whistleblowing incident ==
In 1998 and 1999, Chopra, along with two co-workers, Margaret Haydon and Gerard Lambert, testified to the Senate of Canada's Standing Committee on Agriculture and Forestry that they were pressured by senior supervisors to approve multiple drugs of questionable safety, including Bovine Growth Hormone (rBST) and Baytril, which in the words of Chopra, "is even more controversial. It's a critical antibiotic, one that produces cross-resistance against a critical antibiotic necessary for human use called ciprofloxacin. It's from the same class of drugs. When it is used in poultry, beef, turkeys, pigs, or whatever, then it causes cross-resistance in the intestines of those animals. Then those bacteria, like Salmonella, Campylobacter, or E. coli, get transferred to people and cause disease and death of immense order." Prior to the mad cow disease crisis in Canada, Chopra warned the government that the current handling of feed to cows was inadequate. Following this, Chopra, Haydon, Lambert and colleague Chris Bassude complained to the Public Service Integrity Officer (PSIO) office, a federal investigative body under the jurisdiction of the Treasury Board of Canada, indicating again that they were pressured by their seniors to pass a number of veterinary drugs, including Tylosin, Revalor H, Synergistin Injectable Suspension, Baytril, rBST, Carbodex and Eugenol, without proof of human safety. The PSIO case was initially dismissed in 2003, but the ruling was appealed to the Federal Court of Canada.

In June 2004, Chopra, Haydon and Lambert were fired from Health Canada. Health Canada denied that the trio was fired for speaking publicly about the pressure employed by their supervisors to approve the usage of a number of animal drugs, but did not reveal the exact reason, mentioning that the reasons were confidential and included in the letters of termination the three scientists received. Chopra's letter revealed that the stated reason for his dismissal was his "total lack of progress" in a current project.

Three weeks later, Chopra received a congratulatory letter and a gold watch from Deputy Health Minister Ian Green, declaring that his "years of service have not gone unnoticed" and that he had "earned praise and respect."

On April 29, 2005, the Federal Court of Canada quashed the previous finding of the PSIO, and found that the PSIO had inadequately handled Chopra, Haydon and Lambert's complaints. The Federal Court's decision called into question the credibility of the PSIO, citing a failure in the organization in protecting whistleblowers acting in good faith.

== Human rights complaint ==
In September 2008, Human Rights Tribunal (HRT) adjudicator Pierre Deschamps ruled that Chopra was entitled to $4,000 in damages for "hurt feelings", lost wages, and interest after finding that Chopra was subjected to discriminatory comments, was suspended in retaliation for filing an earlier human rights complaint, and was discriminated against when passed over for a temporary promotion. Chopra's "hurt feelings" were in response to a 1998 speech by an incoming superior at Health Canada, during which the speaker stated that "he liked visible minorities." In his complaint, Chopra claimed this was a "deeply insensitive racial remark toward visible minority employees of the bureau." Deschamps accepted Chopra's argument, writing that Lachance's remark was "discriminatory against Mr. Chopra as well as individuals … who were non-white" and that Lachance's remark showcased his insensitivity. Deschamps criticized the racist nature of Lachance's remark. Deschamps also stated that the supervisor's intent was irrelevant, as: "The test is, over and above the racial nature of the comment itself, whether or not the person alleging discrimination was offended by the comment."

Although the tribunal ruled in favour of Chopra on some points, it also chastised him for "asserting that every manager at Health Canada practises racial discrimination, and for alleging that every appointment in the past 20 years has been discriminatory" and that such sweeping assertions, made "without a proper evidentiary basis," undermine Chopra's credibility. Several other complaints by Chopra that he was passed over for promotions because of his race were also dismissed. The tribunal also ruled that "there is no reason for the Tribunal to conclude that systemic discrimination still exists at Health Canada and to order it to take additional measures to address general or systemic issues of discrimination."

Jonathan Kay of the National Post criticized the decision, alleging that Deschamps accepted Chopra's claim without any "substantive explanation."

== Discipline and termination ==
In 2011, the federal Public Sector Labour Relations and Employment Board (PSLRB) dismissed grievances by Chopra, Haydon and Lambert; the PSLRB upheld their suspensions and terminations of employment. Chopra and Haydon sought judicial review of the decision, which the Federal Court allowed and remitted to the PSLRB for redetermination. The Federal Court of Appeal upheld the judicial review decision in 2015. In 2016, the PSLRB adjudicator upheld Chopra's dismissal, finding that the penalty was warranted in light of his disciplinary record for acts of insubordination. An application for judicial review was dismissed by the Federal Court of Appeal in 2017.

== Autobiography ==
Shiv Chopra identified his life so completely with his whistleblowing at Health Canada that his autobiography is nearly all about his work protecting Canadians from unsafe products being pushed through approval. In 1974 Chopra sat for an interview for a shift in position at the Bureau of Drugs. He was asked, "Suppose you are selected for this post, whom would you consider to be your client?" Chopra replied, "The public, of course." The interviewer replied, "No, it is the industry." Chopra insisted that the mandate of the position was Parliament's Food and Drugs Act (page 19). Such unabashed subservience of supervisors to corporate influence convinced Chopra that Health Canada was Corrupt to the Core - Memoirs of a Health Canada Whistleblower, the title of the autobiography. One aspect of his whistleblowing was flagging obstructions to advancement, which he grieved and sued. The major conflict was approval of unsafe products:

All these managers expected everyone to follow as government policy expecting the departments' own scientists to pass products of questionable safety. Among the products that they were expected to pass were growth hormones, antibiotics and drugs to be used in food-producing animals in order to obtain extra yields of meat and milk. The potential harm that these products could cause in consequence of passing them into the food supply included cancer, immune and reproductive disorders, antimicrobial resistance, and other effects in people.

As a whistleblower has a daunting task of standing up to an institution, Chopra demonstrated the importance of documentation and public relations. Some family background and the wedding with Nirmala fill the first chapter, but most of 295 pages of text recount bureaucratic battling. The names and positions of 120 interlocutors in government are listed (pages 323-6). An appendix gives 20 pages of reproductions of key correspondence. Furthermore, Chopra lists 59 print media reports, 11 radio or television shows, and a bibliography of media sources, special reports, books and letters. Prefaces to the autobiography were supplied by Maude Barlow and MP Paul Dewar.

=== Five Pillars of Food Safety ===
In an epilogue, Chopra recounts a trip to Powell River, British Columbia, where he met with organic farmers. He experienced an epiphany while speaking to them. He summarized his expression in this declaration:

It is our divine right as people of God and our constitutional right as people of Canada to eat and feed our families the food that the earth produces naturally. Therefore, we demand all contaminants in our food supply be banned by an act of Parliament. The five items in question include: Hormones, antibiotics, genetically modified organisms (GMOs), rendered animal proteins, and pesticides.

Since people in any country might aspire to such protection, Chopra stated, "Canada is a key country in which to launch such an action." (page 295) Chopra acknowledged assistance from The Council of Canadians to spread the word for food safety.

== Awards and honors ==
On November 14, 2011, Chopra, Haydon and Lambert became the first recipients of the Canadian Journalists for Free Expression Integrity Award, in recognition of their role as "individuals who acted courageously in the public interest without thought of personal gain, and in doing so risked reprisals in the form of threats to their careers, livelihood, or personal freedom."

== Film appearances ==
- 2003: The Corporation
- 2005: Frankensteer
- 2008: Homo toxicus
- 2008: The World According to Monsanto
- 2009: The Idiot Cycle
- 2012: Seeds of Death: Unveiling the Lies of GMOs

== See also ==
- Canadian Human Rights Commission
