= Gender disparities in Kenyan education =

Gender disparities in Kenyan education are the differences in educational outcomes observed between different genders in Kenya. Specifically, gender disparities imply that one sex is disadvantaged over the other in experiences and outcomes. Education disparities can be seen in different enrollment rates, dropout rates, and survival rates among the sexes. Often these phenomena happen together. This can also include a difference in the quality of education received. In Kenya, gender disparities in education may be created or perpetuated by policy, ethnicity, region, religion, and age.

== Overall performances and transition rates ==
Enrollment in education has greatly increased in Kenya over the years. During the last two decades of colonial rule, it is estimated that girls took up just 25% of all children enrolled in the workforce. In 1953, only one woman, or 6% of all students, achieved post-secondary education. Since then, according to a UNICEF study, enrollment has increased and the gender gap has reduced in size. UNICEF estimates as of 2012, 83.2% of youth (ages 15–24), are literate. In 1973, the girls made up only 43% of total primary school enrollment. In the educationally advanced districts, this proportion was close to 50%, while in the districts in the pastoral areas and coastal province, it was below 32%.

UNICEF states females actually show slightly higher enrollment than males in primary school, 84.5% enrollment compared to 83.5% for boys. In addition, overall survival rate to the last year of primary school is a high 96.1%. However, the relationship between male and female enrollment switches and widens in secondary education. In secondary school, 51.6% of enrolled students are male and 48.4% are female. UNICEF reports that the greatest gender disparity exists among the poorest quintile group of Kenya, with attendance rates being 33.1% and 25% for males and females respectively. What is very clear is that there is a distinct difference in rates of enrollment for females in certain districts, with the highest district, Kirinyaga enrolling 51.8% of its girls in school and the lowest district, Wajir, only enrolling 13.9% of its girls.

== Regional and ethnic disparities ==
The demographics of Kenya includes over 43 ethnic tribes. In recent years, violent ethnic conflict has come to the attention of the media, especially because of the 2007-08 Kenyan crisis, however, it is believed by many that this violence represents a larger problem in Kenya: uneven and combined development that leads to uneven resources and outcomes among its ethnic groups. Kenyan regions were determined by the British Empire during colonization to reflect ethnic differences, and enrollment in different levels of education varies by region as a result. Regional differentiation has been linked to uneven capitalist development that occurred in Kenya in the first half of the twentieth century. Some regions were chosen as central regions, and periphery regions were given different, lesser functional roles, resulting in different outcomes and accentuating ethnic differences. This regional differentiation, meant to create a class of capitalist farmers to replace the peasants during colonization, created disparities between the rural workers and the poorest marginal group.

=== History of ethnic and regional disparities ===
Before 1900, Christian Missionaries set up schools mostly along the east coast of Kenya, before swiftly moving inland. The main missionary settlements were in the present Central Province (Kenya), Eastern Province (Kenya), Western Province (Kenya), and Nyanza Province, particularly in the Central and Western Province; there were very few settlements in the Rift Valley Province and parts of Coast Province. This lowered concentration of schools in these districts continued over the decades.

Provinces of Kenya: 1. Central; 2. Coast; 3. Eastern; 4. Nairobi / 5. North Eastern; 6. Nyanza; 7. Rift Valley; 8. Western

The tribes that were penetrated most deeply by the initial missionary spring in the 1920s were the Luo, Luhya, Kikuyu, Embu, Meru, and Kamba.

The Luo and Kikuyu were the first tribes to embrace Western systems, including education and are also the groups that have advanced most greatly socio-economically along the tribes. Other tribes like the Kalenjin, who lived in the Rift valley, previously mentioned to have had less missionary presence, were slower to jump onto the Western education bandwagon because of their regional disadvantage. The spreading of education in Kenya was a political one as all tribes initially resisted the presence of missionary force until they realized the socio-economic benefits. Education was a way to escape forced labor and unfair market conditions under colonial presence. As Kinyanjui goes on to say, over time the different tribes decided to take more power over their educational systems. The first to do so were the Kikuyu. It seems that as missionary presence intensified in an area, more initial protest and subsequent acceptance of Western education and tribal advancement happened. This phenomenon varied in strength in different regions. In regions that took longer to assimilate into Western countries and benefit from advanced schooling systems, the girls experienced greater education inequality. Kikuyu, Luo and other groups have benefited from this early educational influence experience greater academic achievement and female enrollment in the long term than in other tribes.

== Achievements in gender disparities in Kenya ==
Because of dwindling land reserves, higher stress has been put on formal education. The Kenyan government has also poured vast amounts of resources into educating the population, including introducing universal primary schooling. Education has increasingly become more valuable since more Kenyans have been able to get more middle and higher-income jobs due to education. In addition, illegitimate post-colonial elections have perpetuated the socioeconomic advancement of certain regions like the Central region, over others by elected officials.

=== Achievement in codified law ===
In 1972, the Law of Succession was enacted that requires equal access to property at death when the owner dies without a will.

== Challenges to gender equality ==
=== Ethnic, tribal, and family barriers ===
All four major tribes in Kenya (Kikuyu, Luo, Luyia, and Kamba) are polygynous, patrilineal, and usually patrilocal. For example, traditionally (before the 1972 Law of Succession) only male relatives could inherit land from their fathers in the Kikuyu, Luo, and Luyia tribes, with the exception of Kamba women being able to inherit from their husbands. However, often women may not be able to assert their rights to inherit due to low literacy among women, expenses in court, and corruption. According to Cubbins, although females are increasingly more involved in the productive labor of their households, in rural areas, they are mostly in charge of agriculture production that goes back into the households, whereas fathers mainly have control over the cash crops which have the economic power to support their children in school. Because women are more likely to invest their resources into their children's education, the traditional practice of males controlling cash crops poses a significant concern for gender disparities in Kenya.

One of the reasons the Kikuyus, the tribe to assimilate into Western education first, refused to enter into this formal education was because missionaries often put restrictions on groups who practiced female genital mutilation. This barrier kept Kenyans of many tribes from being able to access formal education from the missionaries.

In some tribes, girls who receive formal education may be seen as breaking traditional tribal norms and rejecting the tribal lifestyle. As Lesorogol observed in the Samburu people, educated women may differentiate themselves by enforcing conceptual differences along the dimensions of knowledge/capabilities and morality/sexuality. Many times when educated women show knowledge of Swahili or English, the nation's national languages, or work outside the home, they are seen as showing off their superiority or not valuing traditional roles for women. Educated women may be viewed by their tribes, family members and greater society as "worldly", a definition that often comes with associated connotations like disrespectful, arrogant, or even promiscuous.

=== National barriers ===
Even though the Law of Succession was passed in 1972, women are still denied access to disputing these rights in court due to corruption, lack of knowledge of their rights under the law, and court fees. Government aid to rural areas where technical skill in agriculture may be high is often not very much. This contributes to a lower amount of resources parents can invest in their children's education, especially daughters. Women and children make up most of these households in rural areas, where fathers may be absent for long periods of time. Until 1979, Kenya required people to pay for the first 6 years of schooling, lowering the number of children enrolled in primary schools. Importance of mother education. Of those who were chosen, males were more likely to be chosen than girls. This early disparity inhibited the growth of women in education because women are more likely to invest resources into providing education for their daughters if they have also gotten an education.

== Consequences of gender inequality ==
When denied access to formal education, girls may grow up illiterate and without the tools to gain the economic resources needed to invest in the education of the next generation of Kenyan women. In addition, education often prolongs marriage, and because marriage almost always means the end of education for women, additional years of schooling can give a woman more opportunities to stay in school and gain economic tools before marriage. Girls who do not continue with school are also more likely to encounter forced marriages and the forceful practice of female genital mutilation (FGM).

As of 2023, the lack of menstrual health and reproductive education, and unaffordable products, such as sanitary pads, lead to high rates transactional sex, suicide and increased school drop-out rates. In 2017, Kenyan President Uhuru Kenyatta mandated the government to provide pubescent girls with sanitary towels free of charge in public schools. In February 2020, the government stated that it was not meeting its goal. In 2016, the Bill and Melinda Gates Foundation granted US$2.6 million to Zanaa Africa to study the efficacy of sanitary pads and reproductive health education on the quality of life of female Kenyan teens.

When women stay in school, they are more likely to go into areas like teaching, law, and arts subjects over areas like science, engineering and medicine. Between 1980 and 1987, bachelor's degrees in education and arts accounted for between 63.7% and 67.6% of the total attained by women. Trends like this may lead to the narrow isolation of women into service and teaching jobs.

== Possible solutions ==
=== Increasing the number of female teachers ===
Beyond the primary school level, female teachers are significantly fewer in number than their male counterparts. Kenya represents a diverse group of religious groups. The second largest group is the Muslim group. Many Muslim families prefer for their daughters to be taught by females only, and increasing the number of female teachers may subsequently increase female participation, as well as increase the number of female administrators. For this to happen, supplementary laws, including those that protect maternity leave, equal pay, and discrimination in the workplace, may have to be implemented. In the prestigious University of Nairobi, according to Chege and Sifuna, less than 20% of teachers are female.

=== Evening out regional disparities ===
Rural areas and the specific ethnic groups they compose suffer from disproportionately low resources in education and receive significantly less funds from the government. More schools with more female teachers could be created in rural areas and policies could be enacted to stem the surge of government funds to solely urban areas.

=== Increasing land and other economic resources to women ===
Since the land reform acts of the 1950s, it has been difficult for women to possess land, where before they had easy access through traditional kinship arrangements. Government aid has also been low to rural areas and has not directly benefited woman. According to Cubbins, men's education and women's education are both highly related to the education of both girls and boys, and so increasing general educational attainment should decrease gender disparities in education over time.

== See also ==
- Education in Kenya
- Women in Kenya
- Female education
- Education inequality
- ZanaAfrica foundation
