= Fusarium dry rot =

Common potato disease

Fusarium dry rot is one of the most common potato diseases. It is caused by fungi in the genus Fusarium. This fungi causes a variety of colored rots in potatoes. This pathogen, while having both a sexual and asexual form, stays in an asexual cycle due to the way it spreads. Preferring warmer climates, it is not uncommon to find this pathogen in the northern United States where it has been reported to affect yield as much as 60%.

== Hosts and symptoms ==
Fusarium dry rot of potato is a devastating post-harvest losses (vegetables) disease affecting both seed potatoes and potatoes for human consumption. Dry rot causes the skin of the tuber to wrinkle. The rotted areas of the potato may be brown, grey, or black and the rot creates depressions in the surface of the tuber. Seed pieces may rot completely before they have the chance to be planted.

The genus that causes dry rot of potato, Fusarium, is a fungus. Signs of Fusarium can be seen on an infected potato, and include white or pink mycelia (masses of vegetative fungal tissue) and very colorful spores that can be blue, black, purple, grey, white, yellow, or pink.

== Disease cycle ==
The most prevalent Fusarium species is Fusarium sambucinum. There are thirteen known dry rotting species of Fusarium but Fusarium sambucinum causes the most problems in the United States. Fusarium species are asexual but some do have a sexual stage. The sexual stage for Fusarium sambucinum is known as Gibberella pulicaris but little is known about it other than it is an ascomycete.

Each tuber is capable of producing a brand new plant from various eye spots. Farmers can culture an identical plant from each tuber, in turn cutting costs as each tuber can sprout multiple new plants. However, this also creates new sources of dry rot.

Tubers are stored over winter and in the spring, they are cut up so that each piece yields a new plant. Fusarium takes advantage of this overwintering and spring cutting. The pathogen is unable to enter the tuber until it is either wounded through harvest, storage, or cutting and thus if there is any inoculum present in the soil, it has to wait until harvest occurs to infect the tuber. Once in, the fungus, along with other opportunistic pathogens like soft rot, begin to decompose the tubers and are able to kill off the plant before it emerges. Depending on the time of year, this pathogen moves and infects in different manners. As Fusarium is a soil borne pathogen, if there is sufficient wounding to the tubers, it may infiltrate that way. Because of the way this Fusarium species spreads, it does not need to produce any above ground fruiting bodies. It is only necessary to form microconidia late in the season or remain in the tubers to infect in the following season.

The general cycle is as follows:

1. Overwinters in/on infected and healthy tubers in warehouse.
2. During the spring, tubers are cut to create seeds for planting. This allows for increased spread.
3. "Seeds" are then put in storage before planting and disease continues to spread.
4. During later spring when the crop is planted, less than 50% of planted seed sprouts due to rot.
5. As the season progresses, rotted seed and sprouts leave behind sparse fields of smaller, weaker potatoes
6. Potatoes that were not infected can still cause a problem as Fusarium can produce microconidia and rest in the soil and on tubers.
7. During late summer harvest, damage is caused to the newly grown tubers allowing for Fusarium to infect.
8. In the fall, tubers are put into storage with ideal growing conditions for Fusarium to spread and allow for opportunistic species to infect.

== Environment ==
Warmer climates are preferred. However; different species of Fusarium may be more prevalent in different areas. Michigan is currently having trouble with Fusarium sambucinum. Fusarium sambucinum can be found in Ohio, Michigan, Wisconsin, North Dakota, and Montana. Fusarium requires higher moisture to grow and is not able to when conditions are only periodic.

Temperatures preferred for growth and spread are above 50F. There are currently no listed vectors known to carry and transmit Fusarium sambucinum. However, humans are very good at transmitting the pathogen through the creation of cull piles, agricultural equipment, or warehouse storage where temperatures and moisture are ideal for growth.

== Management ==
There are many ways to manage dry rot. Application of thiabendazole, also known as Mertect, was a common and efficacious method used from 1970 to 1985. Eventually, however, the pathogen developed resistance to the chemical treatment, and while some people still use thiabendazole, it is no longer an effective treatment.

Effective chemical control of dry rot can be achieved with chemicals like Tops MZ, Maxim MZ, and Moncoat MZ. These chemicals protect not only against dry rot, but also against other potato diseases like rhizoctonia, silver scurf, and black dot. These chemical treatments can delay emergence of the young plants, but this doesn't mean these chemicals shouldn't be used. Many fungicides, including thiabendazole, work best when they are applied to tubers before they are cut into seed pieces.

Cultural practices can also limit the spread of dry rot. Farmers are advised to only use certified, disease-free seed, and to inspect seed pieces personally to ensure that they are symptom-free. Seed should be stored at 40-42 degrees Fahrenheit, but gently warmed to 50 degrees prior to cutting. The cooler temperatures antagonize growth of Fusarium, and the warmer temperature encourages potato tubers to heal any post-harvest wounds, minimizing the chance that Fusarium will get inside the tuber.

Sanitation is very important in controlling dry rot. Storage facilities and cutting equipment should be disinfected frequently. The blades used for cutting should be sharp to ensure clean cuts. Farmers also should not keep “cull piles” of potato tubers. .

Before planting, cut seed pieces should be treated with fungicide, such as Tops MZ, Moncoat MZ, or Maxim MZ. The seed pieces should be planted in warm, well-drained soil within 24 hours of cutting; this environment is conducive to sprout growth and emergence. The seed pieces should be shielded from wind and sunlight before they are planted, to prevent dehydration.

Tubers shouldn't be harvested until their skins have set and their internal temperature is greater than 50 degrees Fahrenheit. These measures minimize the risk of harvest injury, which could give the Fusarium pathogen entrance into the tuber.

Biological control of dry rot is an intriguing concept, but currently nothing is available commercially. Researchers at Michigan State University are investigating the efficacy of Bacillus subtilis and Bacillus pumilis (both bacteria) and Trichoderma harzianum (a fungus) in controlling Fusarium dry rot.

Scientists in Tunisia have found that several bacterial species of the genus Bacillus, commonly found in the salty soils of Tunisia, can reduce the amount of rot seen due to Fusarium sambucinum. Bacillus thuringiensis can help control dry rot when applied to older cultures.

== Importance ==
Dry rot is not just a cosmetic problem like many other pathogens. It destroys tubers and leaves them completely inedible or unusable as seed in the future. Long-term storage losses have been reported to be as high as 60% while annual dry rot losses can range from 6 to 25%. In Michigan, over 50% of seed lots have reported having variable levels of dry rot.
