= James Maryanski =

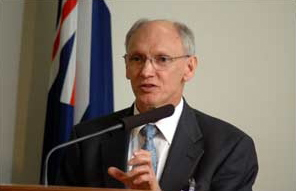

James Maryanski, was the Biotechnology Coordinator for the Food and Drug Administration's Center for Food Safety and Applied Nutrition. He began working for the FDA in 1977 and became acting Coordinator for biotechnology policy in 1986. He retired from FDA in 2006.

== Education ==
Maryanski received a BSc in microbiology from Ohio State University, in 1965 after which he was briefly employed by the US Public Health Service in Ohio. Maryanski received a PhD in 1972 from the University of New Hampshire where he had studied microbiology and marine science.

He then spent four years at the National Institute for Dental Research,[National Institutes of Health, investigating carbohydrate transport and cell adhesion in dental micro-organisms. After retiring from FDA, Dr Maryanski served as an expert consultant on food biotechnology. He lives in Tokyo, Japan.
