= Fatuma Abdulkadir Adan =

Kenyan lawyer and peace ambassador

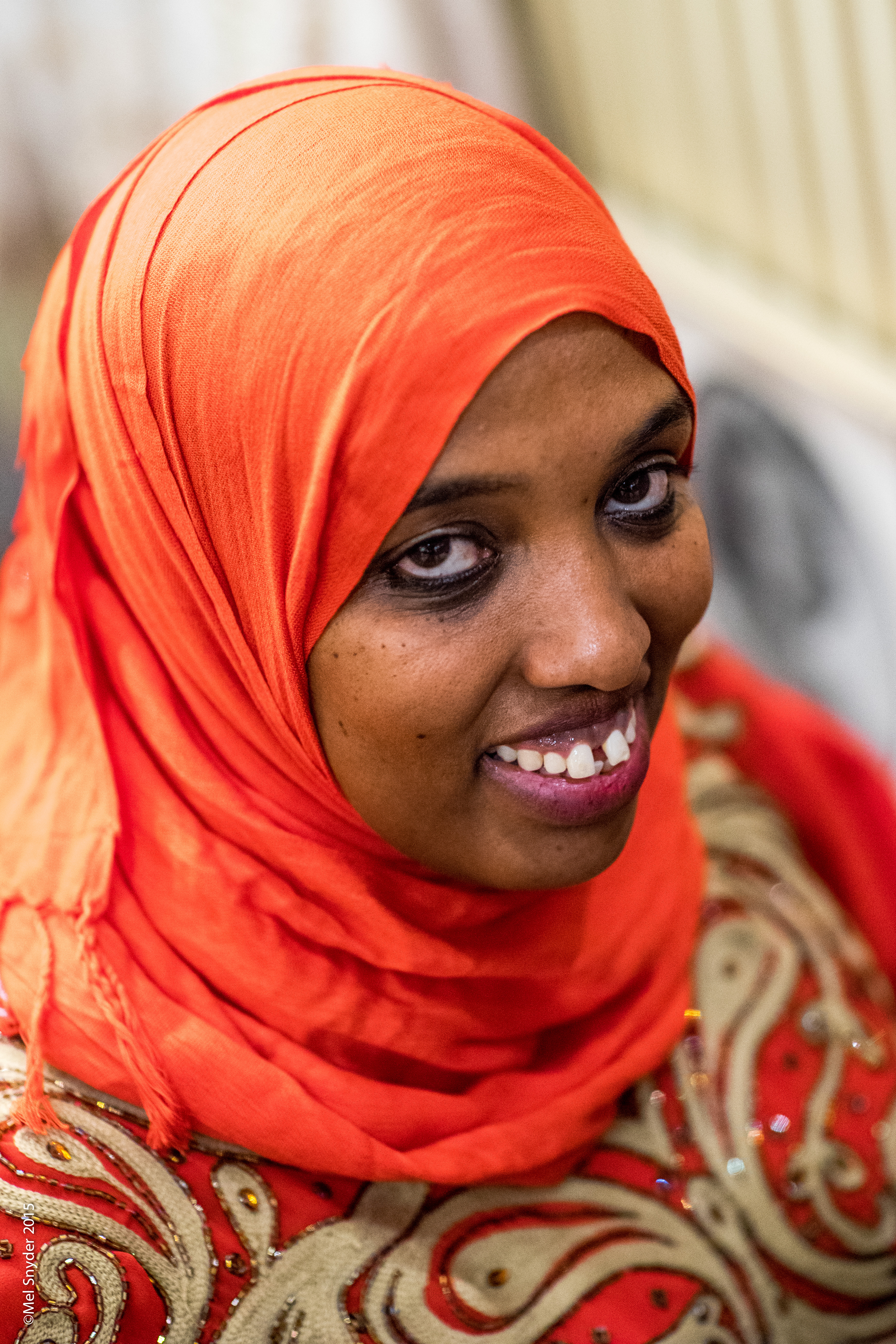
- Born: 1978 (age 47–48); Marsabit, Marsabit County, Kenya
- Occupations: Lawyer; activist
- Years active: 2001–present
- Organization: Horn of Africa Development Initiative
- Known for: "Shoot to Score, Not to Kill" Initiative
- Spouse: Abubakar Lewano
- Parents: Abdulkadir Sheikh Adan (father); Saadia Abdulkadir (mother)
- Awards: Stuttgart Peace Prize; The Unsung Hero Award; Commonwealth Point of Light 68

Fatuma Abdulkadir Adan (born c. 1978) is a Kenyan lawyer and peace ambassador. She is a recipient of the Stuttgart Peace Prize.

== Life ==
Adan was born to parents who were from two warring tribes in Marsabit, Northern Kenya. After her training as a lawyer, she returned to her hometown in order to promote peace between the conflicting Borana Oromo, Gabra and Rendille peoples. In 2003, she founded Horn of Africa Development Initiative, a non-governmental organization she uses to foster peace and advocate for education in Kenya.

Through the Horn of Africa Development Initiative, Adan launched a programme called "Shoot to score, not to Kill", that uses soccer to engage Kenyan youths in advocacy for peace.

Horn of Africa Development Initiative (HODI) is based on four supporting pillars: Advocacy, Education, Economic sustainability and Inter-ethnic Cohesion. Through HODI she started a programme "Breaking the Silence" which has four modules: Be yourself, be healthy, be empowered and know something about finance. Fatuma Adan was the first African woman to be elected as member of the streetfootballworld in 2015. In 2017 she was nominated as part of the Dream Team of the Global Goals World Cup. In January 2011, Adan received the Stuttgart Peace Prize for "combining soccer and emancipation". In 2013 she was invited to talk about her work with the Horn of Africa Development Initiative at the Geneva Peace Talks on 20 September 2013. The talks were organised by the United Nations and other groups for the International Day of Peace.

Adan won a Commonwealth Points of Light Award in 2018 for her work with HODI bringing communities together and championing the rights of women and girls.
