= Stuttgart Peace Prize =

The Stuttgart Peace Prize (German: Stuttgarter Friedenspreis) is an annual award of 5000 Euros made by the non governmental organization Die AnStifter ("The Instigators") to people or projects involved "in a special way for peace, justice and world solidarity".

Voting is open to all who have won either the Foundation or the instigators Stuttgart Peace Prize in the year in question, those who have made a donation before the election or are supporting members. Each voter has three votes, and may give a proposal per vote or distribute their votes over existing proposals.

== Winners ==
- 2003: Committee for Basic Liberties and Democracy, Germany.
- 2004: Lama Tarayra - Palestinian pupil, for her work in reconciling Israeli and Palestinian youth
- 2005: Giuliana Sgrena, Italian journalist who was kidnapped in Iraq.
- 2006: Wolfram Hülsemann (Germany) - Director of the NGO Brandenburg Institute for Community Guidance, Democracy and Integration
- 2007: Agustín Aguayo (United States) - combat medic whose application for conscientious objector status was denied forcing him to desert
- 2008: POEMA (Germany/Brazil) - program against poverty and for protection of the environment in the Amazon rainforest.
- 2009: Susan Bardócz and Árpád Pusztai, scientists and critics of genetic engineering.
- 2010: Werner Baumgarten - pastor for asylum seekers and refugees.
- 2011: Fatuma Abdulkadir Adan (Kenya) - for combining soccer and emancipation ("We aim to score not to kill.“)
- 2012: Aktion Aufschrei – Stoppt den Waffenhandel! (Action Outcry – Stop the Arms Trade!“, Germany)
- 2013: Enio Mancini and Enrico Pieri - survivors of the Sant’Anna di Stazzema massacre in Tuscany, Italy during World War II, who fight for justice and international understanding.
- 2014: Edward Snowden, former CIA employee and whistleblower who disclosed America's extensive surveillance programme in 2013
- 2015: Giusi Nicolini, Mayor of Lampedusa and Linosa.
- 2016: Jürgen Grässlin, peace activist and armament opponent in Germany, publicist of non-fiction books about arms exports, military and economy policy
- 2017: Aslı Erdoğan, Turkish physicist, journalist and author
- 2018: X González, American anti-weapons activist
- 2019: Sea-Watch, NGO that saves lives in the Mediterranean sea
- 2020: Julian Assange, Australian investigative journalist, political activist and founder and spokesperson of WikiLeaks
- 2021: Maria Kalesnikava, Belarusian political activist
- 2022: Reporters Without Borders Germany, non-governmental organization for freedom of information
- 2023: Seebrücke Baden-Württemberg
- 2024: Correctiv, media company
- 2025: Anne Brorhilker, German jurist particularly known for her investigations into the CumEx-Files fraud.
