= Rachel Carson Prize (environmentalist award) =

International environmental award for women

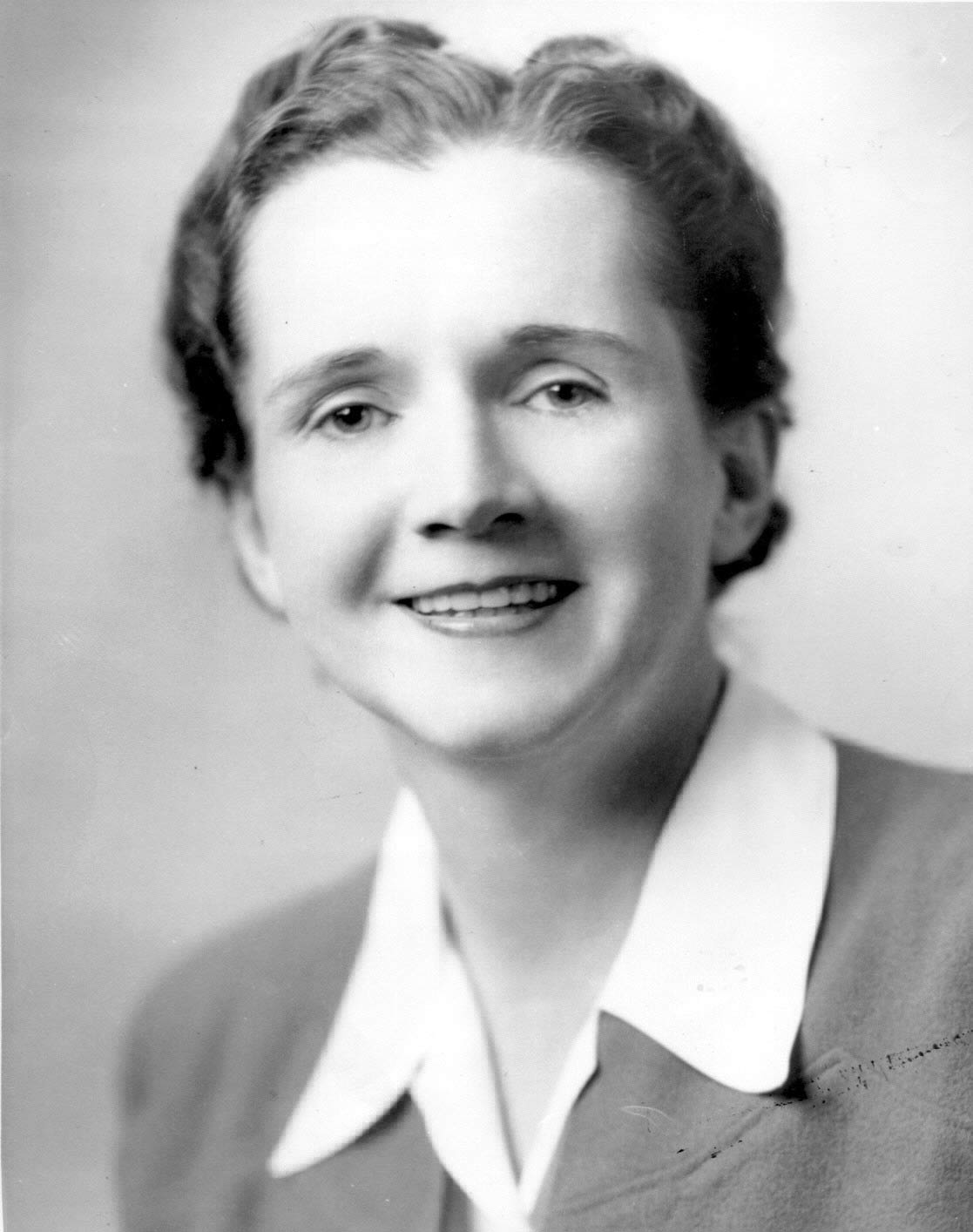
- Rachel Carson
- Awarded for: environmental award
- Date: 1991
- Location: Stavanger
- Country: Norway
- Website: http://www.rachelcarsonprisen.no/

The Rachel Carson Prize (Rachel Carson-prisen) is an international environmental award, established in Stavanger, Norway in 1991 to commemorate the achievements of environmentalist Rachel Carson and to award efforts in her spirit. The prize is awarded to a woman who has distinguished herself in outstanding work for the environment in Norway or internationally.

The prize was established spontaneously during a 1989 meeting in Stavanger, on the initiative of speaker Berit Ås. The prize consists of money and the sculpture The Cormorant by artist Irma Bruun Hodne.

== Awardees ==
- 1991: Sidsel Mørck, Norwegian author and activist
- 1993: Bergljot Børresen, Norwegian veterinarian
- 1995: Anne Grieg, Norwegian psychiatrist
- 1997: Berit Ås, Norwegian feminist and professor in social psychology
- 1999: Theo Colborn, American zoologist
- 2001: Renate Künast, German Federal Minister of Consumer Protection, Food and Agriculture
- 2003: Åshild Dale, Norwegian farmer
- 2005: Malin Falkenmark, Swedish professor in hydrology
- 2007: Sheila Watt-Cloutier, Canadian Inuit climate activist
- 2009: Marie-Monique Robin, French journalist
- 2011: Marilyn Mehlmann, Swedish environmentalist and writer
- 2013: Sam Fanshawe, British marine conservationist
- 2015: Mozhgan Savabieasfahani, Iranian environmental toxicologist
- 2016: Gabrielle Hecht
- 2017: Sylvia Earle
- 2019: Greta Thunberg, Swedish climate activist
- 2021: Maja Lunde, Norwegian author

== See also ==
- Women in science
- List of prizes, medals, and awards for women in science
- List of environmental awards
