= Désirée potato =

Potato cultivar

Potato 'Désirée'
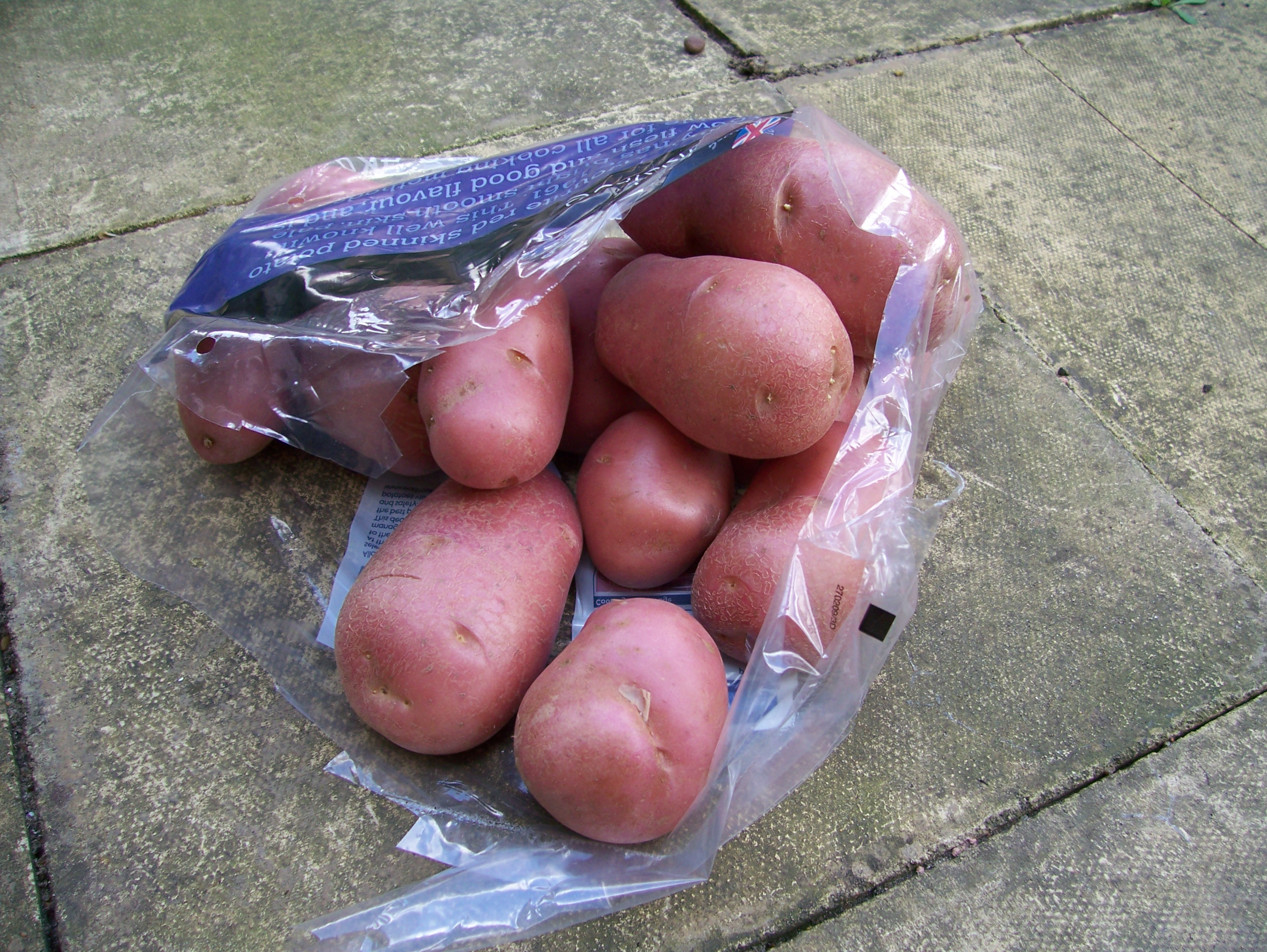
- 'Désirée' potatoes
- Species: Solanum tuberosum
- Cultivar: 'Désirée'
- Origin: Netherlands, 1962

The Désirée potato (sometimes rendered Desirée or Desiree) is a red-skinned main-crop potato originally bred in the Netherlands in 1962. It has yellow flesh with a distinctive flavour and is a favourite with allotment-holders because of its resistance to drought, and is fairly resistant to disease. It is a versatile, fairly waxy variety which is firm and holds its shape, and is useful for all methods of cooking, from roasting to mashing and salads.

It is immune to potato wart and it is resistant to skin spot. It has good resistance to PVY, tuber late blight and blackleg. It also has moderate resistance to PVA, PVX and fusarium dry rot. It is found to be moderately susceptible to leaf late blight and leaf roll, also it is susceptible to common scab.

== Description ==
- Habit: Medium height, later spreading
- Foliage: Medium to dark grey-green, strong purple colour throughout plant
- Stems numerous, purple
- Leaf rigid, open, slightly arched
- Leaflets oval, pointed
- Secondaries few
- Buds/flowers: Buds large, red-purple on hairy stalks, flowers red-violet fading to white

== Other sources ==
- Romans, Alan (2005). The Potato Book. London: Frances Lincoln. ISBN 0-7112-2479-X.
- Barker, Alex; Mansfield, Sally (2002). Potatoes. London: Lorenz Books. ISBN 0-7548-1090-9.
- "British Potato Council".
