= Oemini =

Scientific classification
- Kingdom: Animalia
- Phylum: Arthropoda
- Class: Insecta
- Order: Coleoptera
- Suborder: Polyphaga
- Infraorder: Cucujiformia
- Family: Cerambycidae
- Subfamily: Cerambycinae
- Tribe: Oemini; Pascoe, 1869

Obsolete tribe of beetles

Oemini is an obsolete tribe of beetles in the subfamily Cerambycinae, now placed in the Xystrocerini.

It contained the following genera:

- Amphelissoeme
- Aponoeme
- Argentinoeme
- Atenizus
- Austroeme
- Chromoeme
- Eudistenia
- Euryprosopus
- Gounelleoeme
- Haplidoeme
- Kalore
- Liberedaxia
- Macroeme
- Malacopterus
- Martinsia
- Metalloeme
- Methioeme
- Methioides
- Mimoeme
- Necydalosaurus
- Neoeme
- Nesoeme
- Ocroeme
- Oeme
- Paramartinsia
- Paranoplium
- Paratemnopis
- Phrynoeme
- Placoeme
- Proeme
- Sepaicutea
- Sphagoeme
- Sphalloeme
- Stenoeme
- Temnopis
- Tristachycera
- Vandykea
- Xanthoeme
