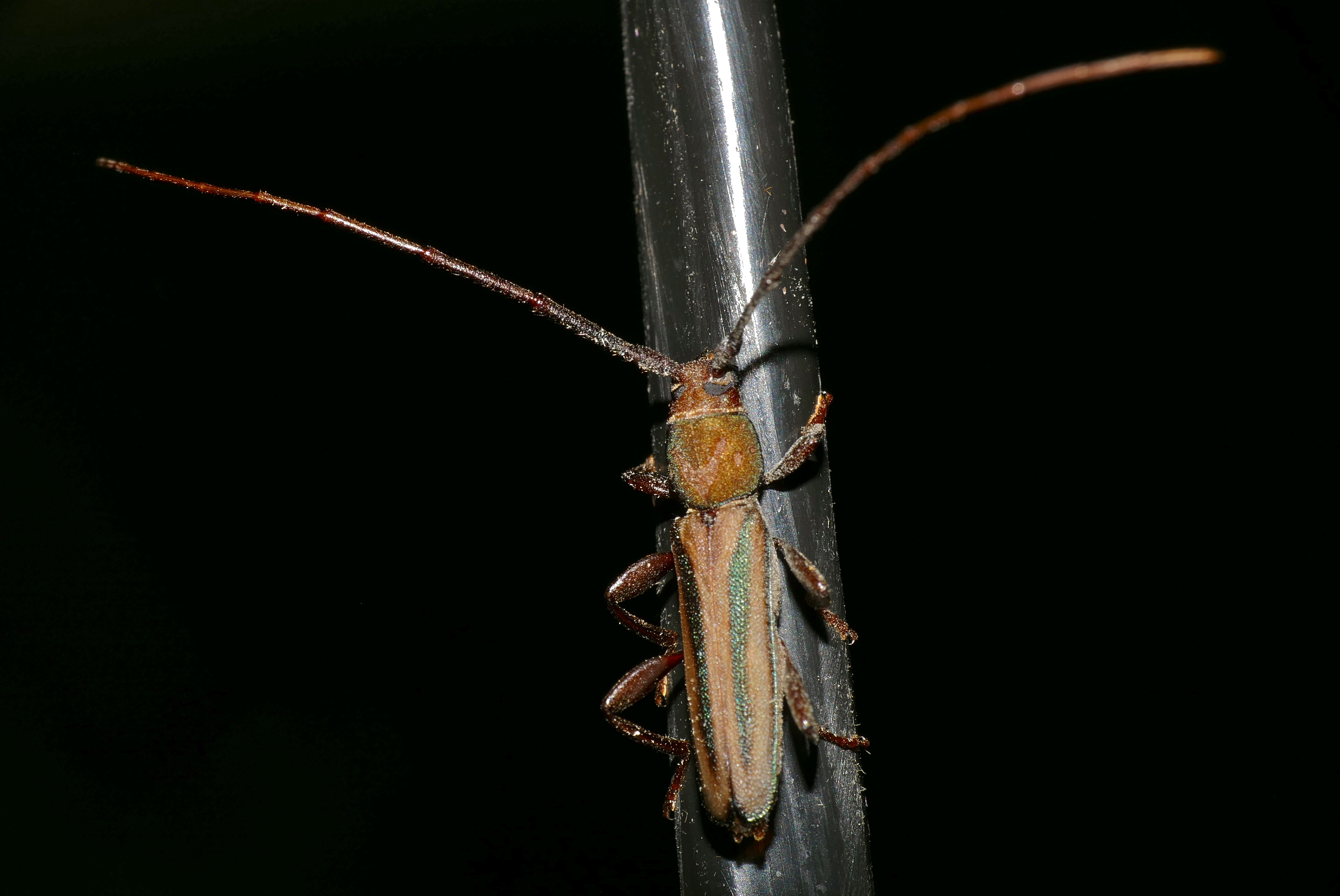
- Xystrocera dispar

Scientific classification
- Kingdom: Animalia
- Phylum: Arthropoda
- Clade: Pancrustacea
- Class: Insecta
- Order: Coleoptera
- Suborder: Polyphaga
- Infraorder: Cucujiformia
- Family: Cerambycidae
- Subfamily: Cerambycinae
- Tribe: Xystrocerini; Blanchard, 1845

Synonyms
- Auxesides Lacordaire, 1869 o; Auxesina Lepesme & Breuning, 1952 nec Lacordaire, 1869; Auxesini Lacordaire, 1869; Methiini Thomson, 1860; Oemini Pascoe, 1869; Psathyrini Quentin, 1954

= Xystrocerini =

Tribe of beetles

Xystrocerini is a tribe of longhorn beetles in the subfamily Cerambycinae, erected by Blanchard in 1845.

== Genera ==
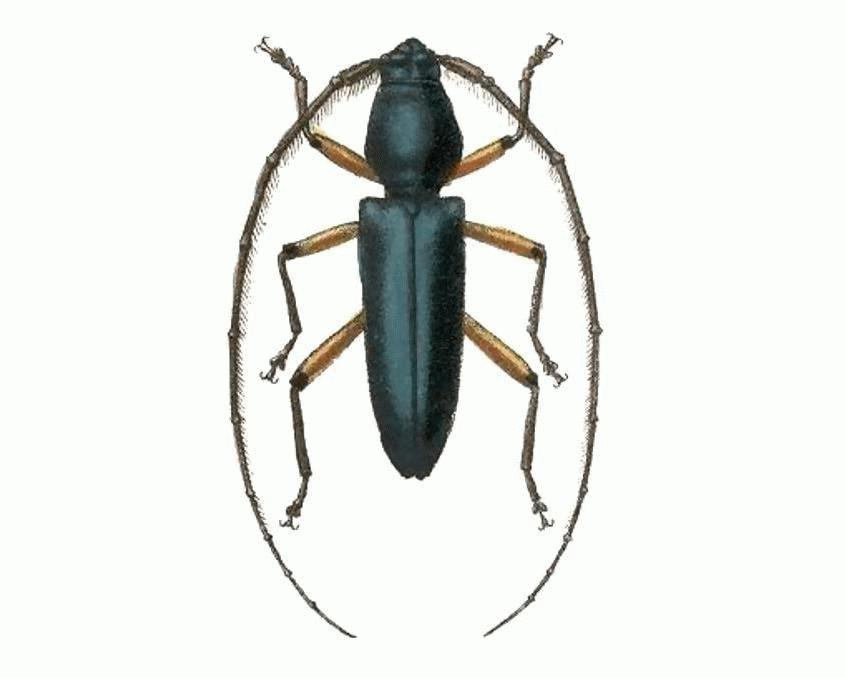
Tristachycera viridis

The following are included in BioLib.cz:

1. Addoeme Adlbauer, 1998
2. Afroeme Adlbauer, 2004
3. Afromethia Adlbauer, 2000
4. Afronoserius Sama, 2008
5. Amimes Pascoe, 1862
6. Amphelissoeme Martins, 1981
7. Amplilygrus Adlbauer, 2004
8. Androeme Aurivillius, 1910
9. Antennoeme Hintz, 1911
10. Aponoeme Martins, 1985
11. Argentinoeme Bruch, 1911
12. Atenizus Bates, 1867
13. Austroeme Martins, Chemsak & Linsley, 1966
14. Auxesis Thomson, 1858
15. Calybistum Thomson, 1878
16. Capezoum Adlbauer, 2003
17. Capoeme Adlbauer, 2008
18. Catoeme Aurivillius, 1908
19. Chromoeme Chemsak & Linsley, 1967
20. Cilioeme Adlbauer, 2006
21. Coleomethia Linsley, 1940
22. Coptoeme Aurivillius, 1903
23. Corioeme Adlbauer, 2006
24. Cyanomethia Philips & Ivie, 1998
25. Cylindroeme Vives, 2019
26. Diptychoeme Aurivillius, 1914
27. Dorjia Holzschuh, 1989
28. Elegantometallyra Adlbauer, 2004
29. Enicoeme Aurivillius, 1915
30. Entetraommatus Fisher, 1940
31. Ethiolygrus Adlbauer, 2008
32. Etiosaphanus Adlbauer, 1999
33. Eudistenia Fall, 1907
34. Euryprosopus White, 1853
35. Fragiliella Holzschuh, 2013
36. Gabunsaphanidus Adlbauer, 2006
37. Gennarus Adlbauer, 2008
38. Gounelleoeme Monné & Martins, 1974
39. Haplidoeme Chemsak & Linsley, 1965
40. Heterosaphanus Aurivillius, 1914
41. Hyphus Lacordaire, 1869
42. Hypoeschrus J. Thomson, 1864
43. Isosaphanodes Breuning, 1958
44. Isosaphanus Hintz, 1913
45. Jendekia Holzschuh, 1993
46. Kabatekiella Holzschuh, 2008
47. Kalore Martins & Galileo, 2006
48. Kenyoeme Quentin & Villiers, 1979
49. Leptoeme Jordan, 1903
50. Leptoxenus Bates, 1877
51. Liberedaxia Alten, Alten & Ramey, 2009
52. Limernaea Thomson, 1878
53. Listrocerum Chevrolat, 1855
54. Macroeme Aurivillius, 1893
55. Madecassometallyra Lepesme & Breuning, 1956
56. Malacopterus Audinet-Serville, 1833
57. Martinsia Chemsak & Linsley, 1967
58. Meiyingia Holzschuh, 2010
59. Metalloeme Touroult, Dalens & Tavakilian, 2010
60. Metallyra Thomson, 1864
61. Methia Newman, 1842
62. Methicula Chemsak & Linsley, 1971
63. Methioeme Zajciw, 1963
64. Methioides Chemsak & Linsley, 1967
65. Metopotylus Quedenfeldt, 1882
66. Millotsaphanidius Lepesme & Breuning, 1956
67. Mimoeme Chemsak & Linsley, 1967
68. Namiboeme Adlbauer, 2000
69. Necydalosaurus Tippmann, 1960
70. Neoeme Gounelle, 1909
71. Neolygrus Martins, 1980
72. Neomarius Fairmaire, 1872
73. Neoxela Botero, Bezark & Santos-Silva, 2022
74. Nesoeme Linsley & Chemsak, 1966
75. Noserius Pascoe, 1857
76. Ocroeme Martins, Chemsak & Linsley, 1966
77. Oeme Newman, 1840
78. Oemodana Gahan, 1904
79. Oemospila Gahan, 1906
80. Oplatocera White, 1853
81. Oxycauloeme Lepesme, 1948
82. Paracalybistum Lepesme, 1952
83. Parahyphus Gressitt, 1959
84. Paramartinsia Martins & Galileo, 2005
85. Paranoplium Casey, 1924
86. Paratemnopis Martins, 1978
87. Paratessaropa Zajciw, 1957
88. Parauxesis Aurivillius, 1915
89. Paroeme Aurivillius, 1886
90. Paulianometallyra Lepesme & Breuning, 1956
91. Pelossus Thomson, 1864
92. Phrynoeme Martins, 1980
93. Placoeme Chemsak & Linsley, 1964
94. Proeme Martins, 1978
95. Prosopoeme Aurivillius, 1927
96. Psathyrioides Breuning & Villiers, 1958
97. Pseudomethia Linsley, 1937
98. Saphanidus Jordan, 1894
99. Senorius Hüdepohl, 1992
100. Sepaicutea Lane, 1972
101. Sphalloeme Melzer, 1928
102. Stenocoptoeme Adlbauer, 2005
103. Stenoeme Gounelle, 1909
104. Styloxus LeConte, 1873
105. Tallyrama Martins, 1980
106. Temnopis Audinet-Serville, 1834
107. Tessaropa Haldeman, 1847
108. Tetraommatus Perroud, 1855
109. Trichopsathyrus Breuning, 1958
110. Tristachycera Bates, 1872
111. Vandykea Linsley, 1932
112. Wappesoeme Galileo, Martins & Santos-Silva, 2015
113. Xanthoeme Martins, 1980
114. Xystrocera Audinet-Serville, 1834
115. Xystroceroides Lepesme, 1948
116. Yementallyrama Adlbauer, 2007
117. Zamioeme Adlbauer, 2012
