= Methiini =

Scientific classification
- Kingdom: Animalia
- Phylum: Arthropoda
- Class: Insecta
- Order: Coleoptera
- Suborder: Polyphaga
- Infraorder: Cucujiformia
- Family: Cerambycidae
- Subfamily: Cerambycinae
- Tribe: Methiini; Thomson, 1860

Obsolete tribe of beetles

Methiini is an obsolete tribe of beetles in the subfamily Cerambycinae, now placed in the Xystrocerini.

It contained the following genera:

- Coleomethia
- Cyanomethia
- Methia
- Methicula
- Paratessaropa
- Pseudomethia
- Styloxus
- Tessaropa
