= S. costata =

S. costata may refer to:

- Schefflera costata, a flowering plant species
- Scissurella costata, a sea snail species
- Sclerolaena costata, a plant
- Scopula costata, a moth species
- Sepaicutea costata, a beetle species
- Spilarctia costata, a moth species
- Symplocos costata, a flowering plant species

== Synonyms ==
- Styela costata, a synonym of Styela angularis, a tunicate species
