= Sphalloeme costipennis =

Scientific classification
- Kingdom: Animalia
- Phylum: Arthropoda
- Class: Insecta
- Order: Coleoptera
- Suborder: Polyphaga
- Infraorder: Cucujiformia
- Family: Cerambycidae
- Subfamily: Cerambycinae
- Tribe: Xystrocerini
- Genus: Sphalloeme
- Species: S. costipennis

Binomial name
- Sphalloeme costipennis Melzer, 1928

Synonyms
- Sphalloeme castipennis Zikán & Wygodzinsky, 1948

Species of beetle

Sphalloeme costipennis is a species of longhorned beetle in the family Cerambycidae, found in Brazil, Argentina, and Honduras.
