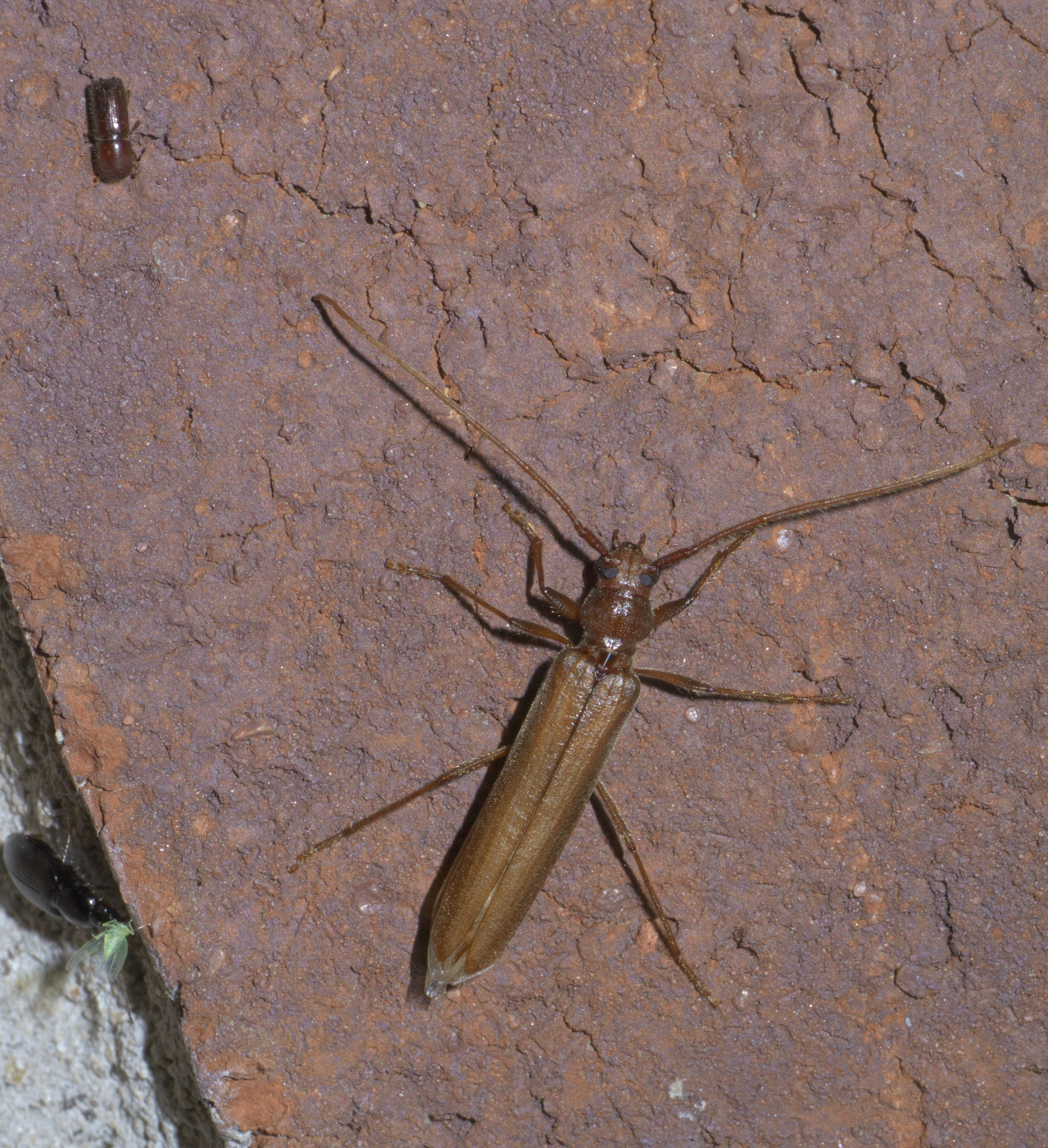
- Oeme rigida in Oklahoma

Scientific classification
- Kingdom: Animalia
- Phylum: Arthropoda
- Class: Insecta
- Order: Coleoptera
- Suborder: Polyphaga
- Infraorder: Cucujiformia
- Family: Cerambycidae
- Subfamily: Cerambycinae
- Tribe: Xystrocerini
- Genus: Oeme
- Species: O. rigida

Binomial name
- Oeme rigida (Say, 1826)

= Oeme rigida =

Species of beetle

Oeme rigida is a species of longhorn beetle in the family Cerambycidae, described by Say in 1826. It is found primarily in the United States and Mexico.

== Subspecies ==
These two subspecies belong to the species Oeme rigida:

- Oeme rigida deserta Casey, 1924
- Oeme rigida rigida
