= Auxesis =

Auxesis may refer to:

- Auxesis (beetle), a genus of longhorn beetles
- Auxesis (biology), expansion of cell size
- Auxesis (figure of speech), exaggerated language
