= Tessaropa carioca =

Scientific classification
- Kingdom: Animalia
- Phylum: Arthropoda
- Class: Insecta
- Order: Coleoptera
- Suborder: Polyphaga
- Infraorder: Cucujiformia
- Family: Cerambycidae
- Genus: Tessaropa
- Species: T. carioca

Binomial name
- Tessaropa carioca Martins, 1981

Species of beetle

Tessaropa carioca is a species of beetle in the family Cerambycidae. It was found in Brazil, and described by Ubirajara Ribeiro Martins in 1981.
