= Methia flavicornis =

Scientific classification
- Kingdom: Animalia
- Phylum: Arthropoda
- Clade: Pancrustacea
- Class: Insecta
- Order: Coleoptera
- Suborder: Polyphaga
- Infraorder: Cucujiformia
- Family: Cerambycidae
- Genus: Methia
- Species: M. flavicornis

Binomial name
- Methia flavicornis Casey, 1924

Species of beetle

Methia flavicornis is a species of beetle in the family Cerambycidae. It was described by Casey in 1924.
