= Listrocerum maynei =

Scientific classification
- Kingdom: Animalia
- Phylum: Arthropoda
- Class: Insecta
- Order: Coleoptera
- Suborder: Polyphaga
- Infraorder: Cucujiformia
- Family: Cerambycidae
- Genus: Listrocerum
- Species: L. maynei

Binomial name
- Listrocerum maynei (Lepesme & Breuning, 1956)

Synonyms
- Psathyrus maynei Villiers, 1959

Species of beetle

Listrocerum maynei is a species of beetle in the family Cerambycidae. It was described by Lepesme and Stephan von Breuning in 1956. It is known from the Democratic Republic of the Congo, Angola, Gabon, and the Central African Republic.
