= Listrocerum olseni =

Scientific classification
- Kingdom: Animalia
- Phylum: Arthropoda
- Class: Insecta
- Order: Coleoptera
- Suborder: Polyphaga
- Infraorder: Cucujiformia
- Family: Cerambycidae
- Genus: Listrocerum
- Species: L. olseni

Binomial name
- Listrocerum olseni (Lepesme & Breuning, 1956)

Species of beetle

Listrocerum olseni is a species of beetle in the family Cerambycidae. It was described by Lepesme and Stephan von Breuning in 1956. It is known from Guinea.
