= Stenoeme kempfi =

Scientific classification
- Kingdom: Animalia
- Phylum: Arthropoda
- Class: Insecta
- Order: Coleoptera
- Suborder: Polyphaga
- Infraorder: Cucujiformia
- Family: Cerambycidae
- Genus: Stenoeme
- Species: S. kempfi

Binomial name
- Stenoeme kempfi Martins, 1980

Species of beetle

Stenoeme kempfi is a species of beetle in the family Cerambycidae. It was described by Martins in 1980.
