= Necydalosaurus mysticus =

Scientific classification
- Kingdom: Animalia
- Phylum: Arthropoda
- Class: Insecta
- Order: Coleoptera
- Suborder: Polyphaga
- Infraorder: Cucujiformia
- Family: Cerambycidae
- Genus: Necydalosaurus
- Species: N. mysticus

Binomial name
- Necydalosaurus mysticus Tippmann, 1960

Species of beetle

Necydalosaurus mysticus is a species of beetle in the family Cerambycidae. It was described by Tippmann in 1960.
