= Austroeme modesta =

Scientific classification
- Kingdom: Animalia
- Phylum: Arthropoda
- Class: Insecta
- Order: Coleoptera
- Suborder: Polyphaga
- Infraorder: Cucujiformia
- Family: Cerambycidae
- Genus: Austroeme
- Species: A. modesta

Binomial name
- Austroeme modesta (Gounelle, 1909)

Species of beetle

Austroeme modesta is a species of beetle in the family Cerambycidae. It was described by Gounelle in 1909.
