= Proeme plagiata =

Scientific classification
- Kingdom: Animalia
- Phylum: Arthropoda
- Class: Insecta
- Order: Coleoptera
- Suborder: Polyphaga
- Infraorder: Cucujiformia
- Family: Cerambycidae
- Genus: Proeme
- Species: P. plagiata

Binomial name
- Proeme plagiata (Buquet, 1860)

Species of beetle

Proeme plagiata is a species of beetle in the family Cerambycidae. It was described by Buquet in 1860.
