= Stenoeme iheringi =

Scientific classification
- Kingdom: Animalia
- Phylum: Arthropoda
- Class: Insecta
- Order: Coleoptera
- Suborder: Polyphaga
- Infraorder: Cucujiformia
- Family: Cerambycidae
- Genus: Stenoeme
- Species: S. iheringi

Binomial name
- Stenoeme iheringi Gounelle, 1909

Species of beetle

Stenoeme iheringi is a species of beetle in the family Cerambycidae. It was described by Gounelle in 1909.
