= Placoeme wappesi =

Scientific classification
- Kingdom: Animalia
- Phylum: Arthropoda
- Class: Insecta
- Order: Coleoptera
- Suborder: Polyphaga
- Infraorder: Cucujiformia
- Family: Cerambycidae
- Genus: Placoeme
- Species: P. wappesi

Binomial name
- Placoeme wappesi Galileo & Martins, 2010

Species of beetle

Placoeme wappesi is a species of beetle in the family Cerambycidae. It was described by Galileo and Martins in 2010.
