= Tessaropa guanabarina =

Scientific classification
- Kingdom: Animalia
- Phylum: Arthropoda
- Class: Insecta
- Order: Coleoptera
- Suborder: Polyphaga
- Infraorder: Cucujiformia
- Family: Cerambycidae
- Genus: Tessaropa
- Species: T. guanabarina

Binomial name
- Tessaropa guanabarina Martins, 1981

Species of beetle

Tessaropa guanabarina is a species of beetle in the family Cerambycidae. It was described by Martins in 1981.
