= Martinsia scabrosa =

Scientific classification
- Kingdom: Animalia
- Phylum: Arthropoda
- Class: Insecta
- Order: Coleoptera
- Suborder: Polyphaga
- Infraorder: Cucujiformia
- Family: Cerambycidae
- Genus: Martinsia
- Species: M. scabrosa

Binomial name
- Martinsia scabrosa Chemsak & Linsley, 1967

Species of beetle

Martinsia scabrosa is a species of beetle in the family Cerambycidae. It was described by Chemsak and Linsley in 1967.
