= Macroeme sobrina =

Scientific classification
- Kingdom: Animalia
- Phylum: Arthropoda
- Class: Insecta
- Order: Coleoptera
- Suborder: Polyphaga
- Infraorder: Cucujiformia
- Family: Cerambycidae
- Genus: Macroeme
- Species: M. sobrina

Binomial name
- Macroeme sobrina Gounelle, 1909

Species of beetle

Macroeme sobrina is a species of beetle in the family Cerambycidae. It was described by Gounelle in 1909.
