= Methia aestiva =

Scientific classification
- Kingdom: Animalia
- Phylum: Arthropoda
- Clade: Pancrustacea
- Class: Insecta
- Order: Coleoptera
- Suborder: Polyphaga
- Infraorder: Cucujiformia
- Family: Cerambycidae
- Genus: Methia
- Species: M. aestiva

Binomial name
- Methia aestiva Fall, 1907

Species of beetle

Methia aestiva is a species of beetle in the family Cerambycidae. It was described by Fall in 1907.
