= Sphagoeme aurivillii =

Scientific classification
- Kingdom: Animalia
- Phylum: Arthropoda
- Class: Insecta
- Order: Coleoptera
- Suborder: Polyphaga
- Infraorder: Cucujiformia
- Family: Cerambycidae
- Genus: Sphagoeme
- Species: S. aurivillii

Binomial name
- Sphagoeme aurivillii Gounelle, 1909

Species of beetle

Sphagoeme aurivillii is a species of beetle in the family Cerambycidae. It was described by Gounelle in 1909.
