= Sphagoeme paraensis =

Scientific classification
- Kingdom: Animalia
- Phylum: Arthropoda
- Class: Insecta
- Order: Coleoptera
- Suborder: Polyphaga
- Infraorder: Cucujiformia
- Family: Cerambycidae
- Genus: Sphagoeme
- Species: S. paraensis

Binomial name
- Sphagoeme paraensis Martins, 1977

Species of beetle

Sphagoeme paraensis is a species of beetle in the family Cerambycidae. It was described by Martins in 1977.
