= Temnopis jolyi =

Scientific classification
- Kingdom: Animalia
- Phylum: Arthropoda
- Class: Insecta
- Order: Coleoptera
- Suborder: Polyphaga
- Infraorder: Cucujiformia
- Family: Cerambycidae
- Genus: Temnopis
- Species: T. jolyi

Binomial name
- Temnopis jolyi Martins, 1978

Species of beetle

Temnopis jolyi is a species of beetle in the family Cerambycidae. It was described by Martins in 1978.
