= Methia fischeri =

Scientific classification
- Kingdom: Animalia
- Phylum: Arthropoda
- Clade: Pancrustacea
- Class: Insecta
- Order: Coleoptera
- Suborder: Polyphaga
- Infraorder: Cucujiformia
- Family: Cerambycidae
- Genus: Methia
- Species: M. fischeri

Binomial name
- Methia fischeri Melzer, 1923

Species of beetle

Methia fischeri is a species of beetle in the family Cerambycidae. It was described by Melzer in 1923.
