= Methia violaceipennis =

Scientific classification
- Kingdom: Animalia
- Phylum: Arthropoda
- Clade: Pancrustacea
- Class: Insecta
- Order: Coleoptera
- Suborder: Polyphaga
- Infraorder: Cucujiformia
- Family: Cerambycidae
- Genus: Methia
- Species: M. violaceipennis

Binomial name
- Methia violaceipennis Chemsak & Linsley, 1964

Species of beetle

Methia violaceipennis is a species of beetle in the family Cerambycidae. It was described by Chemsak and Linsley in 1964.
