= Temnopis rubricollis =

Scientific classification
- Kingdom: Animalia
- Phylum: Arthropoda
- Class: Insecta
- Order: Coleoptera
- Suborder: Polyphaga
- Infraorder: Cucujiformia
- Family: Cerambycidae
- Genus: Temnopis
- Species: T. rubricollis

Binomial name
- Temnopis rubricollis Martins, Galileo & de-Oliveira, 2009

Species of beetle

Temnopis rubricollis is a species of beetle in the family Cerambycidae. It was described by Martins, Galileo and de-Oliveira in 2009.
