= Argentinoeme pseudobscura =

Scientific classification
- Kingdom: Animalia
- Phylum: Arthropoda
- Class: Insecta
- Order: Coleoptera
- Suborder: Polyphaga
- Infraorder: Cucujiformia
- Family: Cerambycidae
- Genus: Argentinoeme
- Species: A. pseudobscura

Binomial name
- Argentinoeme pseudobscura Di Iorio, 1995

Species of beetle

Argentinoeme pseudobscura is a species of beetle in the family Cerambycidae. It was described by Di Iorio in 1995.
