= Coleomethia crinicornis =

Scientific classification
- Kingdom: Animalia
- Phylum: Arthropoda
- Class: Insecta
- Order: Coleoptera
- Suborder: Polyphaga
- Infraorder: Cucujiformia
- Family: Cerambycidae
- Genus: Coleomethia
- Species: C. crinicornis

Binomial name
- Coleomethia crinicornis Hovore, 1987

Species of beetle

Coleomethia crinicornis is a species of beetle in the family Cerambycidae. It was described by Hovore in 1987.
