= Temnopis fasciata =

Scientific classification
- Kingdom: Animalia
- Phylum: Arthropoda
- Class: Insecta
- Order: Coleoptera
- Suborder: Polyphaga
- Infraorder: Cucujiformia
- Family: Cerambycidae
- Genus: Temnopis
- Species: T. fasciata

Binomial name
- Temnopis fasciata Galileo & Martins, 2003

Species of beetle

Temnopis fasciata is a species of beetle in the family Cerambycidae. It was described by Galileo and Martins in 2003.
