= Coleomethia xanthocollis =

Scientific classification
- Kingdom: Animalia
- Phylum: Arthropoda
- Class: Insecta
- Order: Coleoptera
- Suborder: Polyphaga
- Infraorder: Cucujiformia
- Family: Cerambycidae
- Genus: Coleomethia
- Species: C. xanthocollis

Binomial name
- Coleomethia xanthocollis (Knull, 1935)

Species of beetle

Coleomethia xanthocollis is a species of beetle in the family Cerambycidae. It was described by Knull in 1935.
