= Listrocerum aspericorne =

Scientific classification
- Kingdom: Animalia
- Phylum: Arthropoda
- Class: Insecta
- Order: Coleoptera
- Suborder: Polyphaga
- Infraorder: Cucujiformia
- Family: Cerambycidae
- Genus: Listrocerum
- Species: L. aspericorne

Binomial name
- Listrocerum aspericorne Chevrolat, 1855

Synonyms
- Psathyrus aspericornis Chevrolat,

Species of beetle

Listrocerum aspericorne is a species of beetle in the family Cerambycidae. It was described by Chevrolat in 1855. It is known from Nigeria.
