= Listrocerum bicolor =

Scientific classification
- Kingdom: Animalia
- Phylum: Arthropoda
- Class: Insecta
- Order: Coleoptera
- Suborder: Polyphaga
- Infraorder: Cucujiformia
- Family: Cerambycidae
- Genus: Listrocerum
- Species: L. bicolor

Binomial name
- Listrocerum bicolor (Lepesme, 1950)

Synonyms
- Combesius bicolor Lepesme, 1950; Combesius lepesmei Quentin, 1951

Species of beetle

Listrocerum bicolor is a species of beetle in the family Cerambycidae. It was described by Lepesme in 1950, originally under the genus Combesius. It is known from Ghana, Sierra Leone, the Ivory Coast, the Central African Republic, and Togo.
