= Temnopis nigripes =

Scientific classification
- Kingdom: Animalia
- Phylum: Arthropoda
- Class: Insecta
- Order: Coleoptera
- Suborder: Polyphaga
- Infraorder: Cucujiformia
- Family: Cerambycidae
- Genus: Temnopis
- Species: T. nigripes

Binomial name
- Temnopis nigripes Aurivillius, 1893

Species of beetle

Temnopis nigripes is a species of beetle in the family Cerambycidae. It was described by Per Olof Christopher Aurivillius in 1893.
