= Ocroeme tricolor =

Scientific classification
- Kingdom: Animalia
- Phylum: Arthropoda
- Class: Insecta
- Order: Coleoptera
- Suborder: Polyphaga
- Infraorder: Cucujiformia
- Family: Cerambycidae
- Genus: Ocroeme
- Species: O. tricolor

Binomial name
- Ocroeme tricolor Martins, 1980

Species of beetle

Ocroeme tricolor is a species of beetle in the family Cerambycidae. It was described by Martins in 1980.
