= Neoeme quinquelineata =

Scientific classification
- Kingdom: Animalia
- Phylum: Arthropoda
- Class: Insecta
- Order: Coleoptera
- Suborder: Polyphaga
- Infraorder: Cucujiformia
- Family: Cerambycidae
- Genus: Neoeme
- Species: N. quinquelineata

Binomial name
- Neoeme quinquelineata Zajciw, 1958

Species of beetle

Neoeme quinquelineata is a species of beetle in the family Cerambycidae. It was described by Zajciw in 1958.
