= Neoeme annulicornis =

Scientific classification
- Kingdom: Animalia
- Phylum: Arthropoda
- Class: Insecta
- Order: Coleoptera
- Suborder: Polyphaga
- Infraorder: Cucujiformia
- Family: Cerambycidae
- Genus: Neoeme
- Species: N. annulicornis

Binomial name
- Neoeme annulicornis (Buquet, 1859)

Species of beetle

Neoeme annulicornis is a species of beetle in the family Cerambycidae. It was described by Buquet in 1859.
