= Neoeme hudepohli =

Scientific classification
- Kingdom: Animalia
- Phylum: Arthropoda
- Class: Insecta
- Order: Coleoptera
- Suborder: Polyphaga
- Infraorder: Cucujiformia
- Family: Cerambycidae
- Genus: Neoeme
- Species: N. hudepohli

Binomial name
- Neoeme hudepohli (Martins & Monné, 1975)

Species of beetle

Neoeme hudepohli is a species of beetle in the family Cerambycidae. It was described by Martins and Monné in 1975.
