= Tessaropa hispaniolae =

Scientific classification
- Kingdom: Animalia
- Phylum: Arthropoda
- Class: Insecta
- Order: Coleoptera
- Suborder: Polyphaga
- Infraorder: Cucujiformia
- Family: Cerambycidae
- Genus: Tessaropa
- Species: T. hispaniolae

Binomial name
- Tessaropa hispaniolae Lingafelter, 2010

Species of beetle

Tessaropa hispaniolae is a species of beetle in the family Cerambycidae. It was described by Lingafelter in 2010.
