= Mimoeme lycoides =

Scientific classification
- Kingdom: Animalia
- Phylum: Arthropoda
- Class: Insecta
- Order: Coleoptera
- Suborder: Polyphaga
- Infraorder: Cucujiformia
- Family: Cerambycidae
- Genus: Mimoeme
- Species: M. lycoides

Binomial name
- Mimoeme lycoides Chemsak & Linsley, 1967

Species of beetle

Mimoeme lycoides is a species of beetle in the family Cerambycidae. It was described by Chemsak and Linsley in 1967.
