= Atenizus taunayi =

Scientific classification
- Kingdom: Animalia
- Phylum: Arthropoda
- Class: Insecta
- Order: Coleoptera
- Suborder: Polyphaga
- Infraorder: Cucujiformia
- Family: Cerambycidae
- Genus: Atenizus
- Species: A. taunayi

Binomial name
- Atenizus taunayi Melzer, 1920

Species of beetle

Atenizus taunayi is a species of beetle in the family Cerambycidae. It was described by Melzer in 1920.
