= Haplidoeme punctata =

Scientific classification
- Kingdom: Animalia
- Phylum: Arthropoda
- Class: Insecta
- Order: Coleoptera
- Suborder: Polyphaga
- Infraorder: Cucujiformia
- Family: Cerambycidae
- Genus: Haplidoeme
- Species: H. punctata

Binomial name
- Haplidoeme punctata Chemsak & Linsley, 1971

Species of beetle

Haplidoeme punctata is a species of beetle in the family Cerambycidae. It was described by Chemsak and Linsley in 1971.
