= Temnopis megacephala =

Scientific classification
- Kingdom: Animalia
- Phylum: Arthropoda
- Class: Insecta
- Order: Coleoptera
- Suborder: Polyphaga
- Infraorder: Cucujiformia
- Family: Cerambycidae
- Genus: Temnopis
- Species: T. megacephala

Binomial name
- Temnopis megacephala (Germar, 1824)

Species of beetle

Temnopis megacephala is a species of beetle in the family Cerambycidae. It was described by Ernst Friedrich Germar in 1824.
