= Proeme asimoni =

Scientific classification
- Kingdom: Animalia
- Phylum: Arthropoda
- Class: Insecta
- Order: Coleoptera
- Suborder: Polyphaga
- Infraorder: Cucujiformia
- Family: Cerambycidae
- Genus: Proeme
- Species: P. asimoni

Binomial name
- Proeme asimoni Touroult, Dalens & Tavakilian, 2010

Species of beetle

Proeme asimoni is a species of beetle in the family Cerambycidae. It was described by Touroult, Dalens and Tavakilian in 2010.
