= Methia debilis =

Scientific classification
- Kingdom: Animalia
- Phylum: Arthropoda
- Clade: Pancrustacea
- Class: Insecta
- Order: Coleoptera
- Suborder: Polyphaga
- Infraorder: Cucujiformia
- Family: Cerambycidae
- Genus: Methia
- Species: M. debilis

Binomial name
- Methia debilis (Horn, 1895)

Species of beetle

Methia debilis is a species of beetle in the family Cerambycidae. It was described by Horn in 1895.
