= Sphagoeme =

Scientific classification
- Kingdom: Animalia
- Phylum: Arthropoda
- Class: Insecta
- Order: Coleoptera
- Suborder: Polyphaga
- Infraorder: Cucujiformia
- Family: Cerambycidae
- Tribe: Xystrocerini
- Genus: Sphagoeme; Aurivillius, 1893

Genus of beetles

Sphagoeme is a genus of beetles in the family Cerambycidae, containing the following species:

- Sphagoeme acuta Martins & Galileo, 1994
- Sphagoeme aurivillii Gounelle, 1909
- Sphagoeme lineata Martins, 1981
- Sphagoeme nigrotibialis Martins, 1973
- Sphagoeme ochracea Fisher, 1927
- Sphagoeme paraensis Martins, 1977
- Sphagoeme sahlbergi Aurivillius, 1893
- Sphagoeme suturalis Martins, 1977
