= Methia pallidipennis =

Scientific classification
- Kingdom: Animalia
- Phylum: Arthropoda
- Clade: Pancrustacea
- Class: Insecta
- Order: Coleoptera
- Suborder: Polyphaga
- Infraorder: Cucujiformia
- Family: Cerambycidae
- Genus: Methia
- Species: M. pallidipennis

Binomial name
- Methia pallidipennis Linsley, 1942

Species of beetle

Methia pallidipennis is a species of beetle in the family Cerambycidae. It was described by Linsley in 1942.
