= Listrocerum psathyroides =

Scientific classification
- Kingdom: Animalia
- Phylum: Arthropoda
- Class: Insecta
- Order: Coleoptera
- Suborder: Polyphaga
- Infraorder: Cucujiformia
- Family: Cerambycidae
- Genus: Listrocerum
- Species: L. psathyroides

Binomial name
- Listrocerum psathyroides (Lepesme, 1950)

Synonyms
- Combesius psathyroides Lepesme, 1950

Species of beetle

Listrocerum psathyroides is a species of beetle in the family Cerambycidae. It was described by Lepesme in 1950. It is known from the Ivory Coast.
