= Sepaicutea unicolor =

Scientific classification
- Kingdom: Animalia
- Phylum: Arthropoda
- Class: Insecta
- Order: Coleoptera
- Suborder: Polyphaga
- Infraorder: Cucujiformia
- Family: Cerambycidae
- Genus: Sepaicutea
- Species: S. unicolor

Binomial name
- Sepaicutea unicolor Martins, 1981

Species of beetle

Sepaicutea unicolor is a species of beetle in the family Cerambycidae. It was described by Martins in 1981.
