= Methia necydalea =

Scientific classification
- Kingdom: Animalia
- Phylum: Arthropoda
- Clade: Pancrustacea
- Class: Insecta
- Order: Coleoptera
- Suborder: Polyphaga
- Infraorder: Cucujiformia
- Family: Cerambycidae
- Genus: Methia
- Species: M. necydalea

Binomial name
- Methia necydalea (Fabricius, 1798)

Species of beetle

Methia necydalea is a species of beetle in the family Cerambycidae. It was described by Johan Christian Fabricius in 1798.
