= Aponoeme amazonica =

Scientific classification
- Kingdom: Animalia
- Phylum: Arthropoda
- Class: Insecta
- Order: Coleoptera
- Suborder: Polyphaga
- Infraorder: Cucujiformia
- Family: Cerambycidae
- Genus: Aponoeme
- Species: A. amazonica

Binomial name
- Aponoeme amazonica Martins, 1985

Species of beetle

Aponoeme amazonica is a species of beetle in the family Cerambycidae. It was described by U. R. Martins in 1985. It is known from the state of Amazonas, Brazil.
