= Listrocerum =

Scientific classification
- Kingdom: Animalia
- Phylum: Arthropoda
- Class: Insecta
- Order: Coleoptera
- Suborder: Polyphaga
- Infraorder: Cucujiformia
- Family: Cerambycidae
- Tribe: Xystrocerini
- Genus: Listrocerum

Synonyms
- Combesius Lepesme, 1950; Psathyrus Thomson, 1857; Listrocerus Chevrolat, 1855 (misspelling)

Genus of beetles

Listrocerum is a genus of longhorn beetles of the subfamily Lamiinae, containing the following species:

- Listrocerum aeolis (Thomson, 1857)
- Listrocerum apiceniger (Breuning, 1961)
- Listrocerum aspericorne Chevrolat, 1855
- Listrocerum asperipenne (Breuning, 1957)
- Listrocerum bicolor (Lepesme, 1950)
- Listrocerum fuscopicalis (Breuning, 1961)
- Listrocerum joveri (Quentin, 1951)
- Listrocerum maynei (Lepesme & Breuning, 1956)
- Listrocerum murphyi Adlbauer, 2004
- Listrocerum olseni (Lepesme & Breuning, 1956)
- Listrocerum psathyroides (Lepesme, 1950)
- Listrocerum quentini (Lepesme & Breuning, 1956)
