= Ocroeme aspericollis =

Scientific classification
- Kingdom: Animalia
- Phylum: Arthropoda
- Class: Insecta
- Order: Coleoptera
- Suborder: Polyphaga
- Infraorder: Cucujiformia
- Family: Cerambycidae
- Genus: Ocroeme
- Species: O. aspericollis

Binomial name
- Ocroeme aspericollis Martins Chemsak & Linsley, 1966

Species of beetle

Ocroeme aspericollis is a species of beetle in the family Cerambycidae. It was described by Martins Chemsak and Linsley in 1966.
