= Sphagoeme nigrotibialis =

Scientific classification
- Kingdom: Animalia
- Phylum: Arthropoda
- Class: Insecta
- Order: Coleoptera
- Suborder: Polyphaga
- Infraorder: Cucujiformia
- Family: Cerambycidae
- Genus: Sphagoeme
- Species: S. nigrotibialis

Binomial name
- Sphagoeme nigrotibialis Martins, 1973

Species of beetle

Sphagoeme nigrotibialis is a species of beetle in the family Cerambycidae. It was described by Martins in 1973.
