= Mimoeme pseudamerica =

Scientific classification
- Kingdom: Animalia
- Phylum: Arthropoda
- Class: Insecta
- Order: Coleoptera
- Suborder: Polyphaga
- Infraorder: Cucujiformia
- Family: Cerambycidae
- Genus: Mimoeme
- Species: M. pseudamerica

Binomial name
- Mimoeme pseudamerica Touroult, Dalens & Tavakilian, 2010

Species of beetle

Mimoeme pseudamerica is a species of beetle in the family Cerambycidae. It was described by Touroult, Dalens and Tavakilian in 2010.
