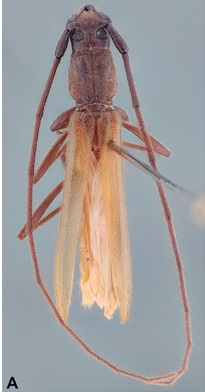

Scientific classification
- Kingdom: Animalia
- Phylum: Arthropoda
- Class: Insecta
- Order: Coleoptera
- Suborder: Polyphaga
- Infraorder: Cucujiformia
- Family: Cerambycidae
- Genus: Stenoeme
- Species: S. aguilari

Binomial name
- Stenoeme aguilari Galileo & Martins, 2010

= Stenoeme aguilari =

Species of beetle

Stenoeme aguilari is a species of beetle in the family Cerambycidae. It was described by Galileo and Martins in 2010. It is found in Paraguay and Brazil.
