= Proeme bucki =

Scientific classification
- Kingdom: Animalia
- Phylum: Arthropoda
- Class: Insecta
- Order: Coleoptera
- Suborder: Polyphaga
- Infraorder: Cucujiformia
- Family: Cerambycidae
- Genus: Proeme
- Species: P. bucki

Binomial name
- Proeme bucki (Melzer, 1931)

Species of beetle

Proeme bucki is a species of beetle in the family Cerambycidae. It was described by Melzer in 1931.
