= Proeme latipennis =

Scientific classification
- Kingdom: Animalia
- Phylum: Arthropoda
- Class: Insecta
- Order: Coleoptera
- Suborder: Polyphaga
- Infraorder: Cucujiformia
- Family: Cerambycidae
- Genus: Proeme
- Species: P. latipennis

Binomial name
- Proeme latipennis (Lane, 1973)

Species of beetle

Proeme latipennis is a species of beetle in the family Cerambycidae. It was described by Lane in 1973.
