= Oeme costata =

Scientific classification
- Kingdom: Animalia
- Phylum: Arthropoda
- Class: Insecta
- Order: Coleoptera
- Suborder: Polyphaga
- Infraorder: Cucujiformia
- Family: Cerambycidae
- Genus: Oeme
- Species: O. costata

Binomial name
- Oeme costata LeConte, 1873

Species of beetle

Oeme costata is a species of beetle in the family Cerambycidae. It was described by John Lawrence LeConte in 1873.
