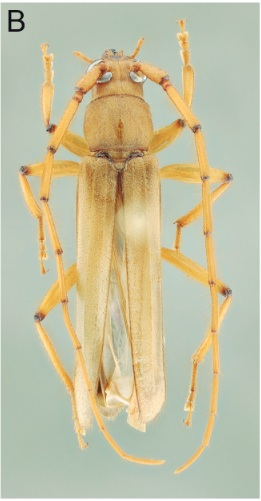

Scientific classification
- Kingdom: Animalia
- Phylum: Arthropoda
- Clade: Pancrustacea
- Class: Insecta
- Order: Coleoptera
- Suborder: Polyphaga
- Infraorder: Cucujiformia
- Family: Cerambycidae
- Genus: Malacopterus
- Species: M. pavidus

Binomial name
- Malacopterus pavidus (Germar, 1824)

Synonyms
- Cerambyx (Stenocorus) pavidus Germar, 1823; Malacomacrus pallescens White, 1853

= Malacopterus pavidus =

Species of beetle

Malacopterus pavidus is a species of beetle in the family Cerambycidae. It was described by Ernst Friedrich Germar in 1824. It is found in Brazil, Paraguay, Argentina and Uruguay.
