= Macroeme cylindrica =

Scientific classification
- Kingdom: Animalia
- Phylum: Arthropoda
- Class: Insecta
- Order: Coleoptera
- Suborder: Polyphaga
- Infraorder: Cucujiformia
- Family: Cerambycidae
- Genus: Macroeme
- Species: M. cylindrica

Binomial name
- Macroeme cylindrica (Thomson, 1857)

Species of beetle

Macroeme cylindrica is a species of beetle in the family Cerambycidae. It was described by Thomson in 1857.
