= Sphagoeme acuta =

Scientific classification
- Kingdom: Animalia
- Phylum: Arthropoda
- Class: Insecta
- Order: Coleoptera
- Suborder: Polyphaga
- Infraorder: Cucujiformia
- Family: Cerambycidae
- Genus: Sphagoeme
- Species: S. acuta

Binomial name
- Sphagoeme acuta Martins & Galileo, 1994

Species of beetle

Sphagoeme acuta is a species of beetle in the family Cerambycidae. It was described by Martins and Galileo in 1994.
