= Listrocerum quentini =

Scientific classification
- Kingdom: Animalia
- Phylum: Arthropoda
- Class: Insecta
- Order: Coleoptera
- Suborder: Polyphaga
- Infraorder: Cucujiformia
- Family: Cerambycidae
- Genus: Listrocerum
- Species: L. quentini

Binomial name
- Listrocerum quentini (Lepesme & Breuning, 1956)

Species of beetle

Listrocerum quentini is a species of beetle in the family Cerambycidae. It was described by Lepesme and Stephan von Breuning in 1956. It is known from the Ivory Coast.
