= Austroeme femorata =

Scientific classification
- Kingdom: Animalia
- Phylum: Arthropoda
- Class: Insecta
- Order: Coleoptera
- Suborder: Polyphaga
- Infraorder: Cucujiformia
- Family: Cerambycidae
- Genus: Austroeme
- Species: A. femorata

Binomial name
- Austroeme femorata Martins, 1997

Species of beetle

Austroeme femorata is a species of beetle in the family Cerambycidae. It was described by Martins in 1997.
