= Kalore asanga =

Scientific classification
- Domain: Eukaryota
- Kingdom: Animalia
- Phylum: Arthropoda
- Class: Insecta
- Order: Coleoptera
- Suborder: Polyphaga
- Infraorder: Cucujiformia
- Family: Cerambycidae
- Genus: Kalore
- Species: K. asanga

Binomial name
- Kalore asanga Martins & Galileo, 2006

Species of beetle

Kalore asanga is a species of beetle in the family Cerambycidae. It was described by Martins and Galileo in 2006.
