= Tessaropa elongata =

Scientific classification
- Kingdom: Animalia
- Phylum: Arthropoda
- Class: Insecta
- Order: Coleoptera
- Suborder: Polyphaga
- Infraorder: Cucujiformia
- Family: Cerambycidae
- Genus: Tessaropa
- Species: T. elongata

Binomial name
- Tessaropa elongata Galileo & Martins, 2009

Species of beetle

Tessaropa elongata is a species of beetle in the family Cerambycidae. It was described by Galileo and Martins in 2009.
