= Temnopis oculata =

Scientific classification
- Kingdom: Animalia
- Phylum: Arthropoda
- Class: Insecta
- Order: Coleoptera
- Suborder: Polyphaga
- Infraorder: Cucujiformia
- Family: Cerambycidae
- Genus: Temnopis
- Species: T. oculata

Binomial name
- Temnopis oculata Zajciw, 1960

Species of beetle

Temnopis oculata is a species of beetle in the family Cerambycidae. It was described by Zajciw in 1960.
