= Listrocerum aeolis =

Scientific classification
- Kingdom: Animalia
- Phylum: Arthropoda
- Class: Insecta
- Order: Coleoptera
- Suborder: Polyphaga
- Infraorder: Cucujiformia
- Family: Cerambycidae
- Genus: Listrocerum
- Species: L. aeolis

Binomial name
- Listrocerum aeolis (Thomson, 1857)

Synonyms
- Listrocerum rufum (Breuning); Psathyrus aeolis Thomson, 1857; Psathyrus rufus Breuning, 1958

Species of beetle

Listrocerum aeolis is a species of beetle in the family Cerambycidae. It was described by Thomson in 1857, originally under the genus Psathyrus. It is known from Mozambique, Ethiopia, Tanzania, Namibia, Kenya, Uganda, South Africa, and Zimbabwe.
