= Macroeme plana =

Scientific classification
- Kingdom: Animalia
- Phylum: Arthropoda
- Class: Insecta
- Order: Coleoptera
- Suborder: Polyphaga
- Infraorder: Cucujiformia
- Family: Cerambycidae
- Genus: Macroeme
- Species: M. plana

Binomial name
- Macroeme plana (Perty, 1832)

Species of beetle

Macroeme plana is a species of beetle in the family Cerambycidae. It was described by Perty in 1832.
