= Macroeme condyla =

Scientific classification
- Kingdom: Animalia
- Phylum: Arthropoda
- Class: Insecta
- Order: Coleoptera
- Suborder: Polyphaga
- Infraorder: Cucujiformia
- Family: Cerambycidae
- Genus: Macroeme
- Species: M. condyla

Binomial name
- Macroeme condyla (Martins, 1971)

Species of beetle

Macroeme condyla is a species of beetle in the family Cerambycidae. It was described by Martins in 1971.
