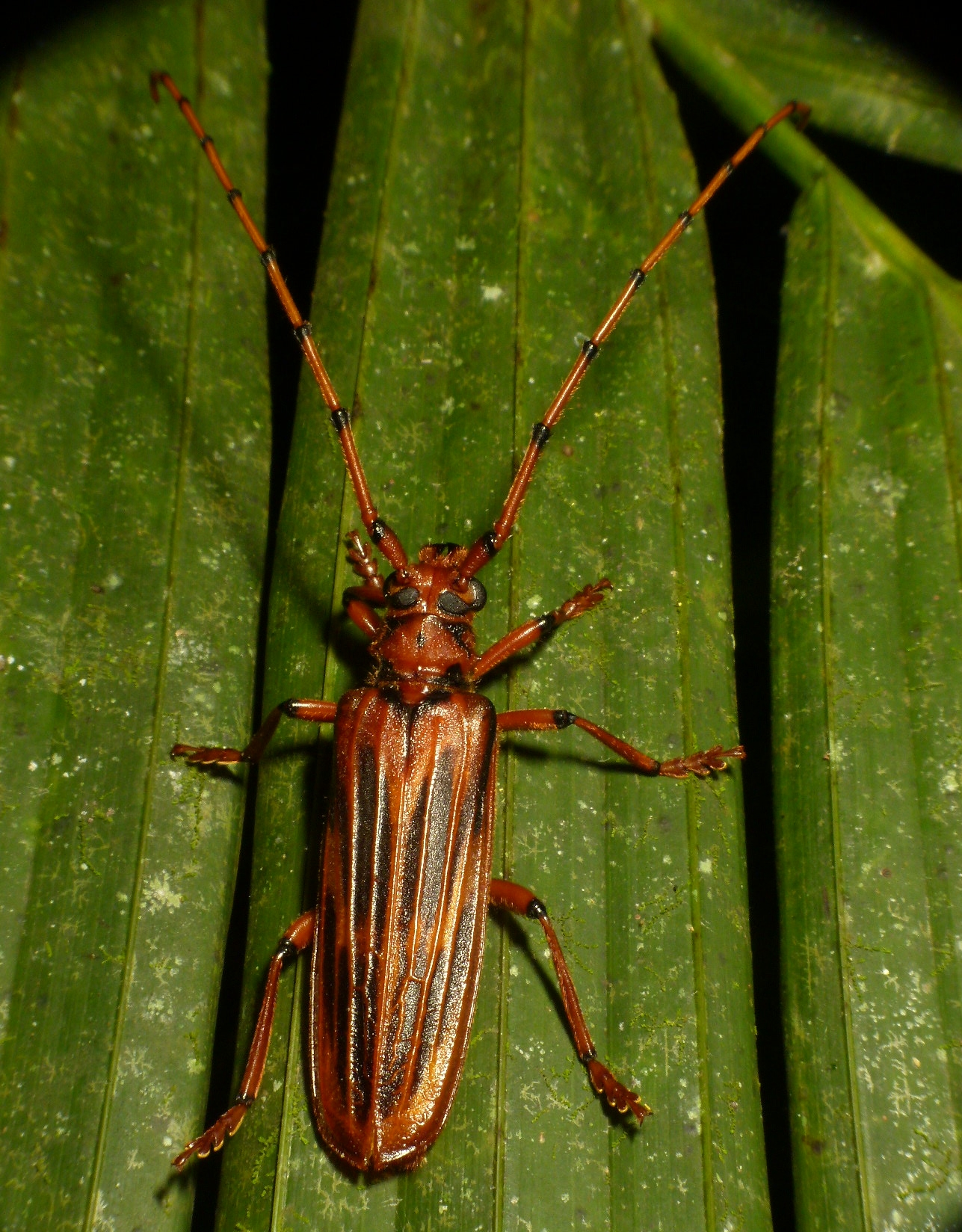
- Oplatocera halli

Scientific classification
- Domain: Eukaryota
- Kingdom: Animalia
- Phylum: Arthropoda
- Class: Insecta
- Order: Coleoptera
- Suborder: Polyphaga
- Infraorder: Cucujiformia
- Family: Cerambycidae
- Subfamily: Cerambycinae
- Tribe: Xystrocerini
- Genus: Oplatocera; White, 1853

Type species
- Oplatocera callidioides White, 1853

= Oplatocera =

Genus of beetles

Oplatocera is a genus of longhorn beetles with about ten species distributed in Asia. The genus is identified by the wide mandibles without teeth on their inner edge with the base being hairy. The antenna base has a thick joint and the third segment is longer than the fourth and the segments shorten from base to tip. The third to seventh antennal segments have spines on the outer margins in some species.

Species are divided into two subgenera and the species currently included in the genus are:

- Subgenus Epioplatocera Gressitt, 1951
  - Oplatocera chujoi Hayashi, 1982 - Philippines (Mindanao)
  - Oplatocera detersa Holzschuh, 2017 - Sumatra
  - Oplatocera halli Lepesme, 1956 - South India
  - Oplatocera khasimontana Hayashi, 1983 - NE India (Assam, Khasi Hills)
  - Oplatocera maculata Pic, 1947 - Vietnam (Tonkin)
  - Oplatocera mandibulata Miwa & Mitono, 1935 - Taiwan
  - Oplatocera mitonoi Hayashi, 1981 - Taiwan
  - Oplatocera oberthuri Gahan, 1906 - Himalayas
  - Oplatocera shibatai Hayashi, 1977 - Borneo, W. Malaysia
  - Oplatocera siamensis Huedepohl, 1994 - Thailand (Chiang Mai)
  - Oplatocera simulata Holzschuh, 2017 - Laos (Hua Phan)
- Subgenus Oplatocera White, 1853 (synonym Hoplitocera Gemminger, 1872)
  - Oplatocera aurociliata Holzschuh, 2016 - NE Laos
  - Oplatocera callidioides White, 1853 - China (Sichuan), Taiwan, "North India" Laos
  - Oplatocera grandis Gressitt, 1951 - China (Sichuan),
  - Oplatocera perroti Lepesme, 1947 - Vietnam (Tonkin)
