= Proeme bella =

Scientific classification
- Kingdom: Animalia
- Phylum: Arthropoda
- Class: Insecta
- Order: Coleoptera
- Suborder: Polyphaga
- Infraorder: Cucujiformia
- Family: Cerambycidae
- Genus: Proeme
- Species: P. bella

Binomial name
- Proeme bella Martins, 1978

Species of beetle

Proeme bella is a species of beetle in the family Cerambycidae. It was described by Martins in 1978.
