= Temnopis martinezi =

Scientific classification
- Kingdom: Animalia
- Phylum: Arthropoda
- Clade: Pancrustacea
- Class: Insecta
- Order: Coleoptera
- Suborder: Polyphaga
- Infraorder: Cucujiformia
- Family: Cerambycidae
- Genus: Temnopis
- Species: T. martinezi

Binomial name
- Temnopis martinezi Martins, 1985

Species of beetle

Temnopis martinezi is a species of beetle in the family Cerambycidae, described by Martins in 1985. It is known from Brazil.
