= Listrocerum asperipenne =

Scientific classification
- Kingdom: Animalia
- Phylum: Arthropoda
- Class: Insecta
- Order: Coleoptera
- Suborder: Polyphaga
- Infraorder: Cucujiformia
- Family: Cerambycidae
- Genus: Listrocerum
- Species: L. asperipenne

Binomial name
- Listrocerum asperipenne (Breuning, 1957)

Synonyms
- Psathyrus asperipennis Breuning, 1957

Species of beetle

Listrocerum asperipenne is a species of beetle in the family Cerambycidae. It was described by Stephan von Breuning in 1957. It is known from Somalia.
