= Temnopis latifascia =

Scientific classification
- Kingdom: Animalia
- Phylum: Arthropoda
- Class: Insecta
- Order: Coleoptera
- Suborder: Polyphaga
- Infraorder: Cucujiformia
- Family: Cerambycidae
- Genus: Temnopis
- Species: T. latifascia

Binomial name
- Temnopis latifascia Martins & Monné, 1975

Species of beetle

Temnopis latifascia is a species of beetle in the family Cerambycidae. It was described by Martins and Monné in 1975.
