= Necydalosaurus durantoni =

Scientific classification
- Kingdom: Animalia
- Phylum: Arthropoda
- Class: Insecta
- Order: Coleoptera
- Suborder: Polyphaga
- Infraorder: Cucujiformia
- Family: Cerambycidae
- Genus: Necydalosaurus
- Species: N. durantoni

Binomial name
- Necydalosaurus durantoni Touroult & Tavakilian, 2008

Species of beetle

Necydalosaurus durantoni is a species of beetle in the family Cerambycidae. It was described by Touroult and Tavakilian in 2008.
