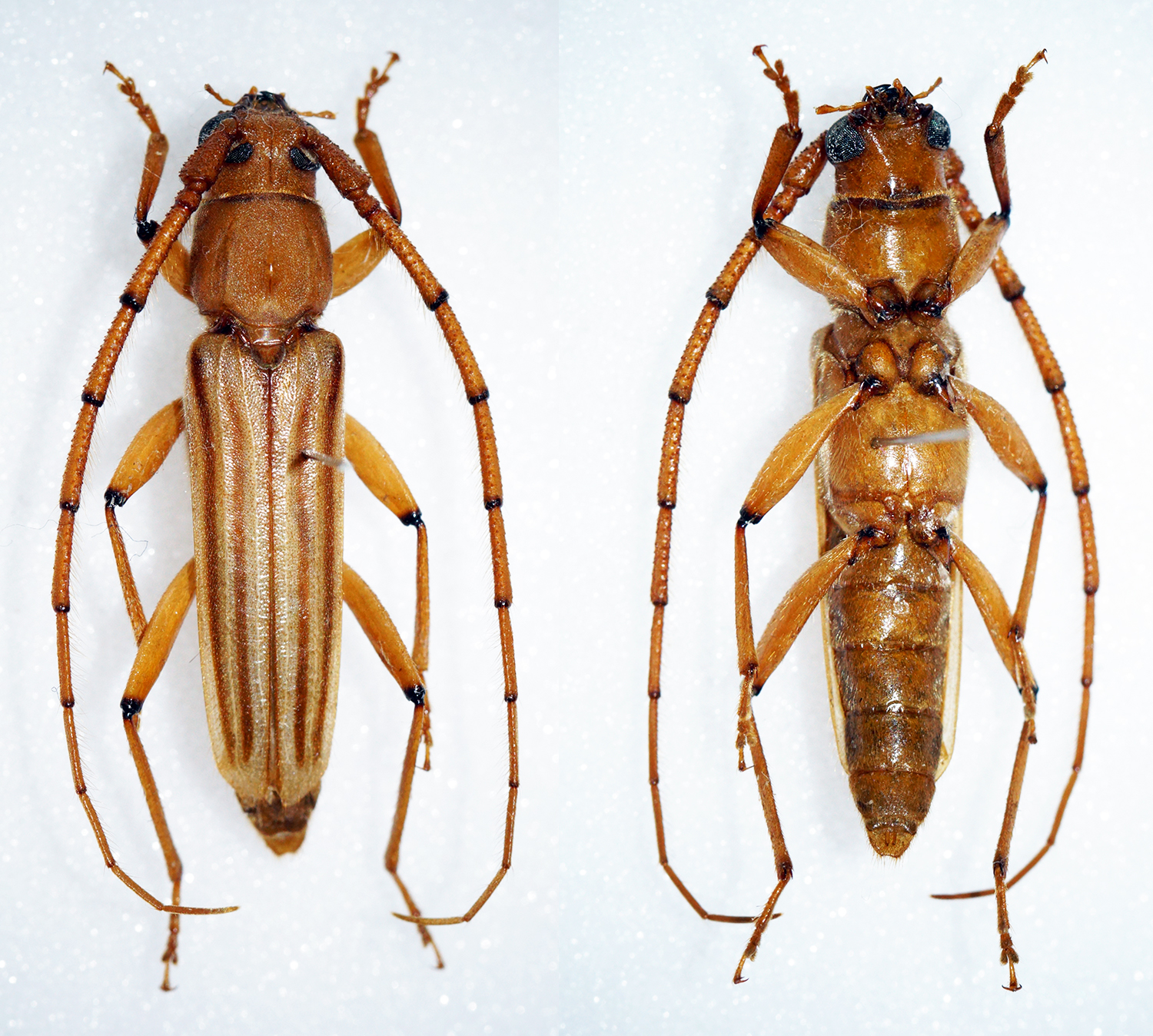

Scientific classification
- Kingdom: Animalia
- Phylum: Arthropoda
- Class: Insecta
- Order: Coleoptera
- Suborder: Polyphaga
- Infraorder: Cucujiformia
- Family: Cerambycidae
- Genus: Malacopterus
- Species: M. tenellus

Binomial name
- Malacopterus tenellus (Fabricius, 1801)

= Malacopterus tenellus =

Species of beetle

Malacopterus tenellus is a species of beetle in the family Cerambycidae. It was described by Johan Christian Fabricius in 1801.
