= Sphagoeme ochracea =

Scientific classification
- Kingdom: Animalia
- Phylum: Arthropoda
- Class: Insecta
- Order: Coleoptera
- Suborder: Polyphaga
- Infraorder: Cucujiformia
- Family: Cerambycidae
- Genus: Sphagoeme
- Species: S. ochracea

Binomial name
- Sphagoeme ochracea Fisher, 1927

Species of beetle

Sphagoeme ochracea is a species of beetle in the family Cerambycidae. It was described by Fisher in 1927.
