= Macroeme vittipennis =

Scientific classification
- Kingdom: Animalia
- Phylum: Arthropoda
- Class: Insecta
- Order: Coleoptera
- Suborder: Polyphaga
- Infraorder: Cucujiformia
- Family: Cerambycidae
- Genus: Macroeme
- Species: M. vittipennis

Binomial name
- Macroeme vittipennis (Melzer, 1934)

Species of beetle

Macroeme vittipennis is a species of beetle in the family Cerambycidae. It was described by Melzer in 1934.
