= Coleomethia bezarki =

Scientific classification
- Kingdom: Animalia
- Phylum: Arthropoda
- Class: Insecta
- Order: Coleoptera
- Suborder: Polyphaga
- Infraorder: Cucujiformia
- Family: Cerambycidae
- Genus: Coleomethia
- Species: C. bezarki

Binomial name
- Coleomethia bezarki Galileo & Martins, 2009

Species of beetle

Coleomethia bezarki is a species of beetle in the family Cerambycidae. It was described by Galileo and Martins in 2009.
