= Listrocerum joveri =

Scientific classification
- Kingdom: Animalia
- Phylum: Arthropoda
- Class: Insecta
- Order: Coleoptera
- Suborder: Polyphaga
- Infraorder: Cucujiformia
- Family: Cerambycidae
- Genus: Listrocerum
- Species: L. joveri

Binomial name
- Listrocerum joveri (Quentin, 1951)

Synonyms
- Combesius joveri Quentin, 1951

Species of beetle

Listrocerum joveri is a species of beetle in the family Cerambycidae. It was described by Quentin in 1951, originally under the genus Combesius. It is known from the Ivory Coast.
