= Listrocerum fuscopicalis =

Scientific classification
- Kingdom: Animalia
- Phylum: Arthropoda
- Class: Insecta
- Order: Coleoptera
- Suborder: Polyphaga
- Infraorder: Cucujiformia
- Family: Cerambycidae
- Genus: Listrocerum
- Species: L. fuscopicalis

Binomial name
- Listrocerum fuscopicalis (Breuning, 1961)

Synonyms
- Psathyrus fuscoapicalis Breuning, 1961

Species of beetle

Listrocerum fuscopicalis is a species of beetle in the family Cerambycidae. It was described by Stephan von Breuning in 1961. It is known from Cameroon.
