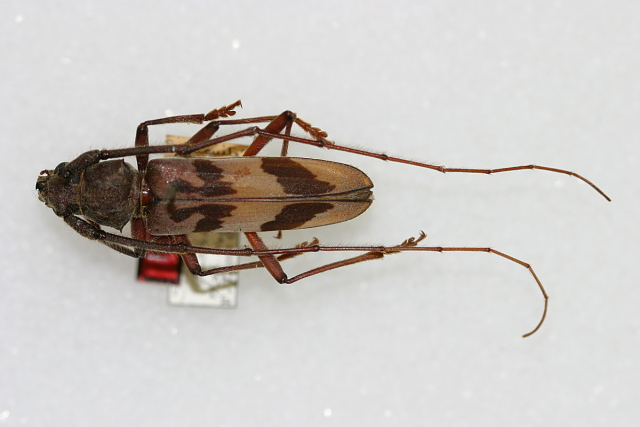

Scientific classification
- Kingdom: Animalia
- Phylum: Arthropoda
- Class: Insecta
- Order: Coleoptera
- Suborder: Polyphaga
- Infraorder: Cucujiformia
- Family: Cerambycidae
- Genus: Sepaicutea
- Species: S. fisheri

Binomial name
- Sepaicutea fisheri Lane, 1972

= Sepaicutea fisheri =

Species of beetle

Sepaicutea fisheri is a species of beetle in the family Cerambycidae. It was described by Lane in 1972.
