= Listrocerum murphyi =

Scientific classification
- Kingdom: Animalia
- Phylum: Arthropoda
- Class: Insecta
- Order: Coleoptera
- Suborder: Polyphaga
- Infraorder: Cucujiformia
- Family: Cerambycidae
- Genus: Listrocerum
- Species: L. murphyi

Binomial name
- Listrocerum murphyi Adlbauer, 2004

Species of beetle

Listrocerum murphyi is a species of beetle in the family Cerambycidae. It was described by Adlbauer in 2004. It is known from Malawi.
