= Atenizus laticeps =

Scientific classification
- Kingdom: Animalia
- Phylum: Arthropoda
- Class: Insecta
- Order: Coleoptera
- Suborder: Polyphaga
- Infraorder: Cucujiformia
- Family: Cerambycidae
- Genus: Atenizus
- Species: A. laticeps

Binomial name
- Atenizus laticeps Bates, 1867

Species of beetle

Atenizus laticeps is a species of beetle in the family Cerambycidae. It was described by Bates in 1867.
