= Neoeme pallida =

Scientific classification
- Kingdom: Animalia
- Phylum: Arthropoda
- Class: Insecta
- Order: Coleoptera
- Suborder: Polyphaga
- Infraorder: Cucujiformia
- Family: Cerambycidae
- Genus: Neoeme
- Species: N. pallida

Binomial name
- Neoeme pallida (Buquet, 1859)

Species of beetle

Neoeme pallida is a species of beetle in the family Cerambycidae. It was described by Buquet in 1859.
