= Tessaropa tenuipes =

Scientific classification
- Kingdom: Animalia
- Phylum: Arthropoda
- Class: Insecta
- Order: Coleoptera
- Suborder: Polyphaga
- Infraorder: Cucujiformia
- Family: Cerambycidae
- Genus: Tessaropa
- Species: T. tenuipes

Binomial name
- Tessaropa tenuipes (Haldeman, 1846)

Species of beetle

Tessaropa tenuipes is a species of beetle in the family Cerambycidae. It was described by Haldeman in 1846.
