= Ocroeme recki =

Scientific classification
- Kingdom: Animalia
- Phylum: Arthropoda
- Class: Insecta
- Order: Coleoptera
- Suborder: Polyphaga
- Infraorder: Cucujiformia
- Family: Cerambycidae
- Genus: Ocroeme
- Species: O. recki

Binomial name
- Ocroeme recki (Melzer, 1931)

Species of beetle

Ocroeme recki is a species of beetle in the family Cerambycidae. It was described by Melzer in 1931.
