= Methia jamaicensis =

Scientific classification
- Kingdom: Animalia
- Phylum: Arthropoda
- Clade: Pancrustacea
- Class: Insecta
- Order: Coleoptera
- Suborder: Polyphaga
- Infraorder: Cucujiformia
- Family: Cerambycidae
- Genus: Methia
- Species: M. jamaicensis

Binomial name
- Methia jamaicensis Philips & Ivie, 1998

Species of beetle

Methia jamaicensis is a species of beetle in the family Cerambycidae. It was described by Philips and Ivie in 1998.
