= Atenizus simplex =

Scientific classification
- Kingdom: Animalia
- Phylum: Arthropoda
- Class: Insecta
- Order: Coleoptera
- Suborder: Polyphaga
- Infraorder: Cucujiformia
- Family: Cerambycidae
- Genus: Atenizus
- Species: A. simplex

Binomial name
- Atenizus simplex Bates, 1884

Species of beetle

Atenizus simplex is a species of beetle in the family Cerambycidae. It was described by Henry Walter Bates in 1884.
