= Listrocerum apiceniger =

Scientific classification
- Kingdom: Animalia
- Phylum: Arthropoda
- Class: Insecta
- Order: Coleoptera
- Suborder: Polyphaga
- Infraorder: Cucujiformia
- Family: Cerambycidae
- Genus: Listrocerum
- Species: L. apiceniger

Binomial name
- Listrocerum apiceniger (Breuning, 1961)

Species of beetle

Listrocerum apiceniger is a species of beetle in the family Cerambycidae. It was described by Stephan von Breuning in 1961. It is known from Cameroon.
