= Macroeme =

Scientific classification
- Kingdom: Animalia
- Phylum: Arthropoda
- Class: Insecta
- Order: Coleoptera
- Suborder: Polyphaga
- Infraorder: Cucujiformia
- Family: Cerambycidae
- Tribe: Xystrocerini
- Genus: Macroeme; Aurivillius, 1893

Genus of beetles

Macroeme is a genus of beetles in the family Cerambycidae, containing the following species:

- Macroeme condyla (Martins, 1971)
- Macroeme cylindrica (Thomson, 1857)
- Macroeme plana (Perty, 1832)
- Macroeme priapica (Thomson, 1857)
- Macroeme similis Martins & Galileo, 2011
- Macroeme sobrina Gounelle, 1909
- Macroeme vittipennis (Melzer, 1934)
