= Placoeme =

Scientific classification
- Kingdom: Animalia
- Phylum: Arthropoda
- Class: Insecta
- Order: Coleoptera
- Suborder: Polyphaga
- Infraorder: Cucujiformia
- Family: Cerambycidae
- Tribe: Xystrocerini
- Genus: Placoeme

Genus of beetles

Placoeme is a genus of beetles in the family Cerambycidae, containing the following species:

- Placoeme vitticollis Chemsak & Linsley, 1964
- Placoeme wappesi Galileo & Martins, 2010
