= Pseudomethia =

Scientific classification
- Domain: Eukaryota
- Kingdom: Animalia
- Phylum: Arthropoda
- Class: Insecta
- Order: Coleoptera
- Suborder: Polyphaga
- Infraorder: Cucujiformia
- Family: Cerambycidae
- Tribe: Methiini
- Genus: Pseudomethia; Linsley, 1937
- Species: P. arida

Binomial name
- Pseudomethia arida Linsley, 1937

Genus of beetles

Pseudomethia is a genus of typical longhorn beetles in the family Cerambycidae. This genus has a single species, Pseudomethia arida, found in California, Arizona, and northwest Mexico.
