= Methia =

Scientific classification
- Kingdom: Animalia
- Phylum: Arthropoda
- Clade: Pancrustacea
- Class: Insecta
- Order: Coleoptera
- Suborder: Polyphaga
- Infraorder: Cucujiformia
- Family: Cerambycidae
- Tribe: Xystrocerini
- Genus: Methia; Newman, 1842

Genus of beetles

Methia is a genus of beetles in the family Cerambycidae, containing the following species:

- Methia acostata Linsley, 1940
- Methia aestiva Fall, 1907
- Methia argentina Bruch, 1918
- Methia arizonica Schaeffer, 1908
- Methia batesi Chemsak & Linsley, 1971
- Methia bicolor (Horn, 1885)
- Methia bicolorata Linsley, 1962
- Methia brevis Fall, 1929
- Methia carinata Linsley, 1940
- Methia curvipennis Chemsak & Linsley, 1965
- Methia debilis (Horn, 1895)
- Methia dentata Chemsak & Linsley, 1964
- Methia dolichoptera Lingafelter, 2010
- Methia dubia Linsley, 1940
- Methia enigma Martins, 1981
- Methia falli Martin, 1920
- Methia fischeri Melzer, 1923
- Methia flavicornis Casey, 1924
- Methia jamaicensis Philips & Ivie, 1998
- Methia juniperi Linsley, 1937
- Methia knulli Linsley, 1940
- Methia lata Knull, 1958
- Methia lineata Linsley, 1935
- Methia longipennis Martins, 1997
- Methia lycoides Chemsak & Linsley, 1971
- Methia maculosa Chemsak & Linsley, 1964
- Methia mormona Linell, 1897
- Methia necydalea (Fabricius, 1798)
- Methia occidentalis Chemsak & Linsley, 1964
- Methia pallidipennis Linsley, 1942
- Methia picta Linsley, 1942
- Methia robusta Linsley, 1940
- Methia subarmata Linsley, 1942
- Methia subvittata Chemsak & Linsley, 1964
- Methia taina Zayas, 1975
- Methia trium Gilmour, 1968
- Methia tubuliventris (Gounelle, 1913)
- Methia violaceipennis Chemsak & Linsley, 1964
- Methia vittata Chemsak & Linsley, 1964
