= Aponoeme =

Scientific classification
- Kingdom: Animalia
- Phylum: Arthropoda
- Class: Insecta
- Order: Coleoptera
- Suborder: Polyphaga
- Infraorder: Cucujiformia
- Family: Cerambycidae
- Subfamily: Cerambycinae
- Tribe: Xystrocerini
- Genus: Aponoeme; Martins, 1985

Genus of beetles

Aponoeme is a genus of beetles in the family Cerambycidae, containing the following species:

- Aponoeme amazonica Martins, 1985
- Aponoeme castanea Martins & Galileo, 1998
