= Limernaea =

Limernaea picta

Scientific classification
- Kingdom: Animalia
- Phylum: Arthropoda
- Class: Insecta
- Order: Coleoptera
- Suborder: Polyphaga
- Infraorder: Cucujiformia
- Family: Cerambycidae
- Genus: Limernaea
- Species: L. picta

Binomial name
- Limernaea picta Thomson, 1878

Genus of beetles

Limernaea picta is a species of beetle in the family Cerambycidae, the only species in the genus Limernaea.
