= Proeme =

Scientific classification
- Kingdom: Animalia
- Phylum: Arthropoda
- Class: Insecta
- Order: Coleoptera
- Suborder: Polyphaga
- Infraorder: Cucujiformia
- Family: Cerambycidae
- Tribe: Xystrocerini
- Genus: Proeme; Martins, 1978

Genus of beetles

Proeme is a genus of beetles in the family Cerambycidae, containing the following species:

- Proeme asimoni Touroult, Dalens & Tavakilian, 2010
- Proeme bella Martins, 1978
- Proeme bucki (Melzer, 1931)
- Proeme cyanescens (Aurivillius, 1910)
- Proeme latipennis (Lane, 1973)
- Proeme lyciformis Martins, 1978
- Proeme plagiata (Buquet, 1860)
- Proeme rufoscapus (Aurivillius, 1910)
- Proeme seabrai Martins, 1978
