= Austroeme =

Scientific classification
- Kingdom: Animalia
- Phylum: Arthropoda
- Class: Insecta
- Order: Coleoptera
- Suborder: Polyphaga
- Infraorder: Cucujiformia
- Family: Cerambycidae
- Subfamily: Cerambycinae
- Tribe: Oemini
- Genus: Austroeme; Martins, Chemsak & Linsley, 1966

Genus of beetles

Austroeme is a genus of beetles in the family Cerambycidae, containing the following species:

- Austroeme femorata Martins, 1997
- Austroeme gentilis (Gounelle, 1909)
- Austroeme modesta (Gounelle, 1909)
