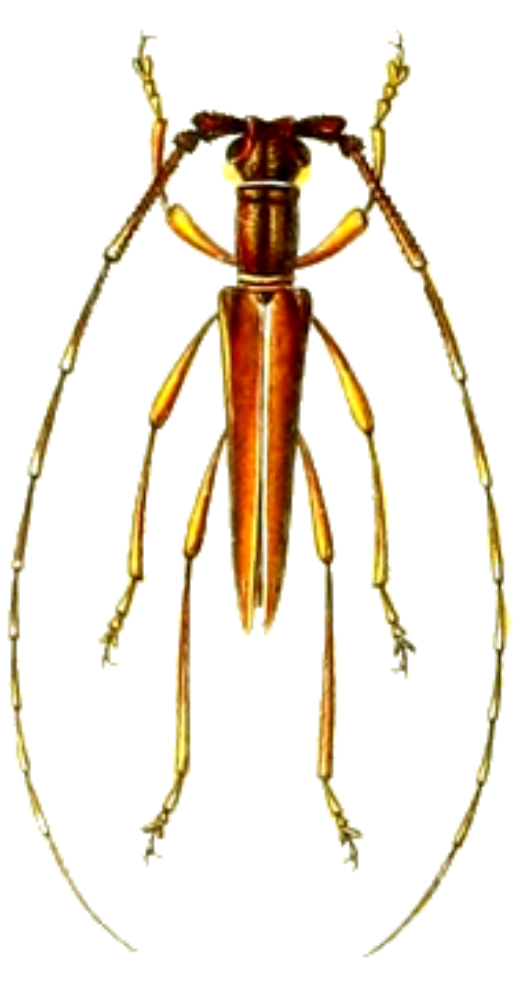

Scientific classification
- Kingdom: Animalia
- Phylum: Arthropoda
- Class: Insecta
- Order: Coleoptera
- Suborder: Polyphaga
- Infraorder: Cucujiformia
- Family: Cerambycidae
- Subfamily: Cerambycinae
- Tribe: Xystrocerini
- Genus: Auxesis; Thomson, 1858
- Species: A. gabonicus

Binomial name
- Auxesis gabonicus Thomson, 1858

Synonyms
- Auxesis gabonica Thomson, 1858 (unjustified emendation)

= Auxesis gabonicus =

Species of beetle

Auxesis gabonicus is a species of beetle in the family Cerambycidae. It is the only species in the genus Auxesis. It was described by Thomson in 1858. It is known from Gabon, the Democratic Republic of the Congo, Angola, the Republic of the Congo, and the Ivory Coast.
