= Temnopis =

Scientific classification
- Kingdom: Animalia
- Phylum: Arthropoda
- Class: Insecta
- Order: Coleoptera
- Suborder: Polyphaga
- Infraorder: Cucujiformia
- Family: Cerambycidae
- Tribe: Xystrocerini
- Genus: Temnopis

Genus of beetles

Temnopis is a genus of beetles in the family Cerambycidae, containing the following species:

- Temnopis castanea Martins, 1978
- Temnopis fasciata Galileo & Martins, 2003
- Temnopis forticornis (Tippmann, 1960)
- Temnopis fuscipennis Martins, 1978
- Temnopis jolyi Martins, 1978
- Temnopis latifascia Martins & Monné, 1975
- Temnopis martinezi Martins, 1985
- Temnopis megacephala (Germar, 1824)
- Temnopis nigripes Aurivillius, 1893
- Temnopis oculata Zajciw, 1960
- Temnopis rubricollis Martins, Galileo & de-Oliveira, 2009
