= Neoeme =

Scientific classification
- Kingdom: Animalia
- Phylum: Arthropoda
- Class: Insecta
- Order: Coleoptera
- Suborder: Polyphaga
- Infraorder: Cucujiformia
- Family: Cerambycidae
- Subfamily: Cerambycinae
- Tribe: Xystrocerini
- Genus: Neoeme; Gounelle, 1909

Genus of beetles

Neoeme is a genus of beetles in the family Cerambycidae, containing the following species:

- Neoeme annulicornis (Buquet, 1859)
- Neoeme bouvieri Gounelle, 1909
- Neoeme hudepohli (Martins & Monné, 1975)
- Neoeme opaca Zajciw, 1958
- Neoeme pallida (Buquet, 1859)
- Neoeme quinquelineata Zajciw, 1958
