= Martinsia =

Scientific classification
- Kingdom: Animalia
- Phylum: Arthropoda
- Class: Insecta
- Order: Coleoptera
- Suborder: Polyphaga
- Infraorder: Cucujiformia
- Family: Cerambycidae
- Subfamily: Cerambycinae
- Tribe: Oemini
- Genus: Martinsia; Chemsak & Linsley, 1967

Genus of beetles

Martinsia is a genus of beetles in the family Cerambycidae, containing the following species:

- Martinsia cordigera Touroult, Dalens & Tavakilian, 2010
- Martinsia scabrosa Chemsak & Linsley, 1967
