= Tessaropa =

Scientific classification
- Kingdom: Animalia
- Phylum: Arthropoda
- Class: Insecta
- Order: Coleoptera
- Suborder: Polyphaga
- Infraorder: Cucujiformia
- Family: Cerambycidae
- Tribe: Xystrocerini
- Genus: Tessaropa

Genus of beetles

Tessaropa is a genus of beetles in the family Cerambycidae, containing the following species:

- Tessaropa boliviana Martins & Galileo, 2006
- Tessaropa carioca Martins, 1981
- Tessaropa elongata Galileo & Martins, 2009
- Tessaropa guanabarina Martins, 1981
- Tessaropa hispaniolae Lingafelter, 2010
- Tessaropa luctuosa Zayas, 1975
- Tessaropa mineira Martins, 1981
- Tessaropa tenuipes (Haldeman, 1846)
