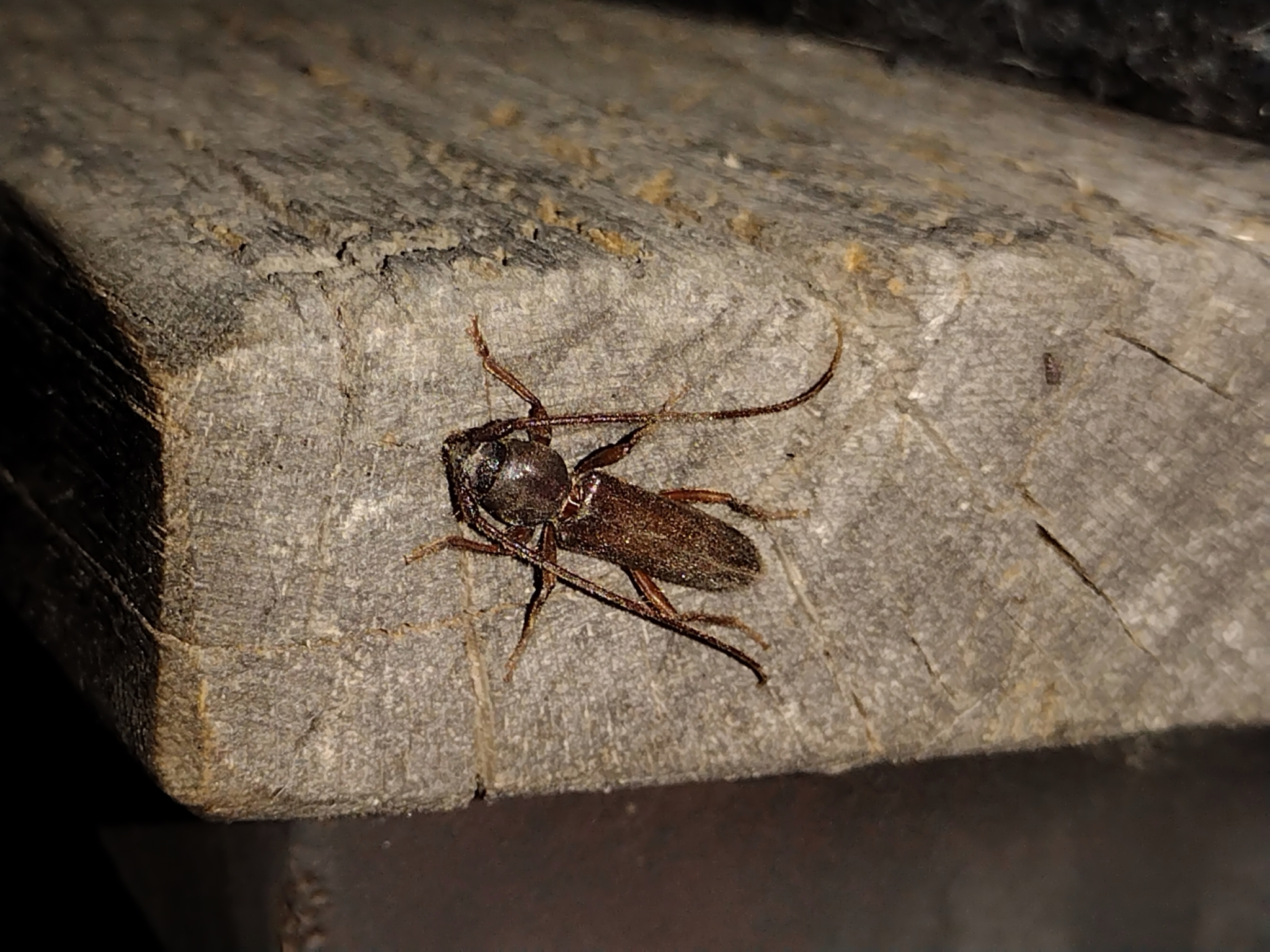
- Paranoplium gracile, California

Scientific classification
- Kingdom: Animalia
- Phylum: Arthropoda
- Class: Insecta
- Order: Coleoptera
- Suborder: Polyphaga
- Infraorder: Cucujiformia
- Family: Cerambycidae
- Tribe: Xystrocerini
- Genus: Paranoplium; Casey, 1924
- Species: P. gracile

Binomial name
- Paranoplium gracile (LeConte, 1881)

= Paranoplium =

Genus of beetles

Paranoplium is a genus of longhorn beetles in the family Cerambycidae. This genus has a single species, Paranoplium gracile. It is found in the western United States and Mexico.
