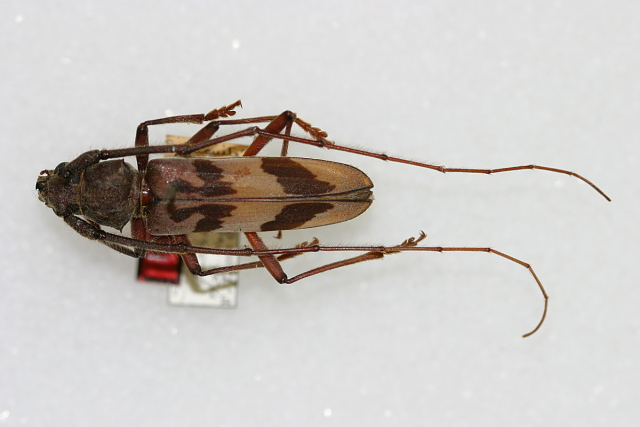
- Sepaicutea fisheri

Scientific classification
- Kingdom: Animalia
- Phylum: Arthropoda
- Class: Insecta
- Order: Coleoptera
- Suborder: Polyphaga
- Infraorder: Cucujiformia
- Family: Cerambycidae
- Tribe: Xystrocerini
- Genus: Sepaicutea

= Sepaicutea =

Genus of beetles

Sepaicutea is a genus of beetles in the family Cerambycidae, containing the following species:

- Sepaicutea costata Martins & Galileo, 2005
- Sepaicutea fisheri Lane, 1972
- Sepaicutea unicolor Martins, 1981
