= Sphalloeme =

Scientific classification
- Kingdom: Animalia
- Phylum: Arthropoda
- Class: Insecta
- Order: Coleoptera
- Suborder: Polyphaga
- Infraorder: Cucujiformia
- Family: Cerambycidae
- Subfamily: Cerambycinae
- Tribe: Xystrocerini
- Genus: Sphalloeme; Melzer, 1928

Genus of beetles

Sphalloeme is a genus of typical longhorn beetles in the family Cerambycidae. There are at least two described species in Sphalloeme.

== Species ==
These two species belong to the genus Sphalloeme:

- Sphalloeme costipennis Melzer, 1928 (Brazil, Argentina, Honduras)
- Sphalloeme mexicana Galileo, Martins & Santos-Silva, 2015 (Mexico)
