= Argentinoeme =

Scientific classification
- Kingdom: Animalia
- Phylum: Arthropoda
- Class: Insecta
- Order: Coleoptera
- Suborder: Polyphaga
- Infraorder: Cucujiformia
- Family: Cerambycidae
- Subfamily: Cerambycinae
- Tribe: Oemini
- Genus: Argentinoeme; Bruch, 1911

Genus of beetles

Argentinoeme is a genus of beetles in the family Cerambycidae, containing the following species:

- Argentinoeme pseudobscura Di Iorio, 1995
- Argentinoeme schulzi Bruch, 1911
