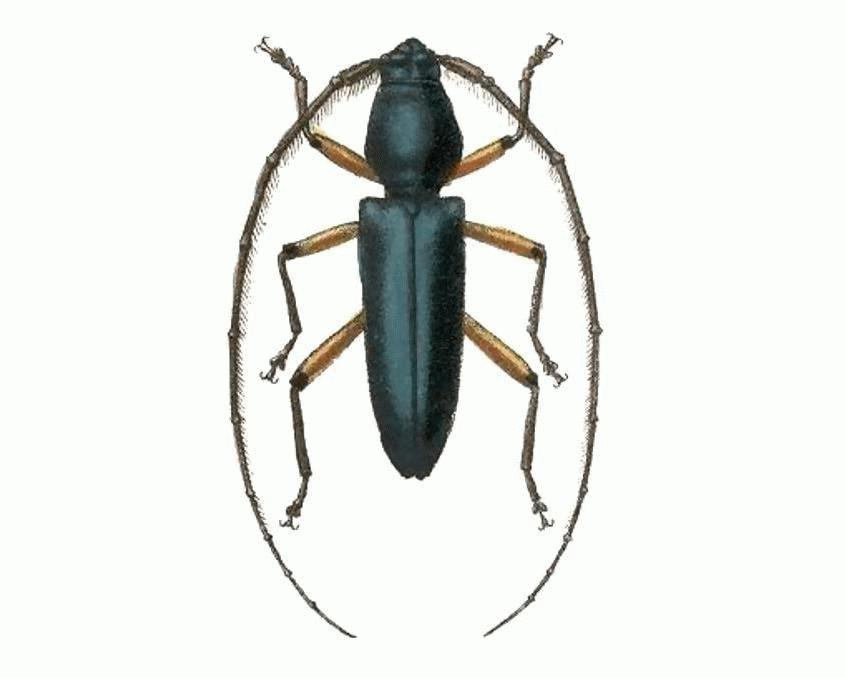

Scientific classification
- Domain: Eukaryota
- Kingdom: Animalia
- Phylum: Arthropoda
- Class: Insecta
- Order: Coleoptera
- Suborder: Polyphaga
- Infraorder: Cucujiformia
- Family: Cerambycidae
- Tribe: Xystrocerini
- Genus: Tristachycera; Bates, 1872
- Species: T. viridis

Binomial name
- Tristachycera viridis Bates, 1872

Synonyms
- Trichachycera Gilmour, 1968

= Tristachycera =

Genus of beetle

Tristachycera is a genus of typical longhorn beetles in the family Cerambycidae. This genus has a single species, Tristachycera viridis, found in Central America.
