= Haplidoeme =

Scientific classification
- Kingdom: Animalia
- Phylum: Arthropoda
- Class: Insecta
- Order: Coleoptera
- Suborder: Polyphaga
- Infraorder: Cucujiformia
- Family: Cerambycidae
- Tribe: Xystrocerini
- Genus: Haplidoeme

Genus of beetles

Haplidoeme is a genus of beetles in the family Cerambycidae, containing the following species:

- Haplidoeme punctata Chemsak & Linsley, 1971
- Haplidoeme schlingeri Chemsak & Linsley, 1965
