= Ocroeme =

Scientific classification
- Kingdom: Animalia
- Phylum: Arthropoda
- Class: Insecta
- Order: Coleoptera
- Suborder: Polyphaga
- Infraorder: Cucujiformia
- Family: Cerambycidae
- Tribe: Xystrocerini
- Genus: Ocroeme; Martins, Chemsak & Linsley, 1966

Genus of beetles

Ocroeme is a genus of beetles in the family Cerambycidae, containing the following species:

- Ocroeme aspericollis Martins Chemsak & Linsley, 1966
- Ocroeme nana (Bates, 1870)
- Ocroeme recki (Melzer, 1931)
- Ocroeme tricolor Martins, 1980
