= Oeme =

Scientific classification
- Kingdom: Animalia
- Phylum: Arthropoda
- Class: Insecta
- Order: Coleoptera
- Suborder: Polyphaga
- Infraorder: Cucujiformia
- Family: Cerambycidae
- Tribe: Xystrocerini
- Genus: Oeme

Species
- See text

Genus of beetles

Oeme is a genus of beetles in the family Cerambycidae.

== Species ==
The genus consists of the following species:

- Oeme costata LeConte, 1873
- Oeme rigida (Say, 1826)
