= Phrynoeme =

Scientific classification
- Kingdom: Animalia
- Phylum: Arthropoda
- Class: Insecta
- Order: Coleoptera
- Suborder: Polyphaga
- Infraorder: Cucujiformia
- Family: Cerambycidae
- Tribe: Xystrocerini
- Genus: Phrynoeme; Martins, 1980
- Species: P. cucullata

Binomial name
- Phrynoeme cucullata (Gounelle, 1913)

Genus of beetles

Phrynoeme is a genus of typical longhorn beetles in the family Cerambycidae. This genus has a single species, Phrynoeme cucullata, found in South America.
