= Coleomethia =

Scientific classification
- Kingdom: Animalia
- Phylum: Arthropoda
- Class: Insecta
- Order: Coleoptera
- Suborder: Polyphaga
- Infraorder: Cucujiformia
- Family: Cerambycidae
- Subfamily: Cerambycinae
- Tribe: Methiini
- Genus: Coleomethia; Linsley, 1940

Genus of beetles

Coleomethia is a genus of beetles in the family Cerambycidae, containing the following species:

- Coleomethia australis Hovore, 1987
- Coleomethia bezarki Galileo & Martins, 2009
- Coleomethia chemsaki Hovore, 1987
- Coleomethia crinicornis Hovore, 1987
- Coleomethia mexicana Chemsak & Linsley, 1964
- Coleomethia xanthocollis (Knull, 1935)
