= Necydalosaurus =

Scientific classification
- Kingdom: Animalia
- Phylum: Arthropoda
- Class: Insecta
- Order: Coleoptera
- Suborder: Polyphaga
- Infraorder: Cucujiformia
- Family: Cerambycidae
- Tribe: Xystrocerini
- Genus: Necydalosaurus

Genus of beetles

Necydalosaurus is a genus of beetles in the family Cerambycidae, containing the following species:

- Necydalosaurus durantoni Touroult & Tavakilian, 2008
- Necydalosaurus ichneumonides Touroult & Tavakilian, 2008
- Necydalosaurus mysticus Tippmann, 1960
