= Liberedaxia =

Scientific classification
- Kingdom: Animalia
- Phylum: Arthropoda
- Class: Insecta
- Order: Coleoptera
- Suborder: Polyphaga
- Infraorder: Cucujiformia
- Family: Cerambycidae
- Tribe: Xystrocerini
- Genus: Liberedaxia; Alten, Alten & Ramey, 2009
- Species: L. deslauriersi

Binomial name
- Liberedaxia deslauriersi Alten, Alten & Ramey, 2009

Genus of beetles

Liberedaxia is a genus of typical longhorn beetles in the family Cerambycidae. This genus has a single species, Liberedaxia deslauriersi, found in Utah and Arizona.
