= Scopula costata =

Scientific classification
- Domain: Eukaryota
- Kingdom: Animalia
- Phylum: Arthropoda
- Class: Insecta
- Order: Lepidoptera
- Family: Geometridae
- Genus: Scopula
- Species: S. costata

Binomial name
- Scopula costata (Moore, [1887])

Synonyms
- Deilinia costata Moore, 1887

Species of geometer moth in subfamily Sterrhinae

Scopula costata is a moth of the family Geometridae. It is found in Sri Lanka.

== Description ==
Its wingspan is 26 millimetres (1.0 in). It is a white moth irrorated (sprinkled) with fuscous. Frons fuscous. Base of collar fulvous. Forewings with a fulvous costal fascia. There is an indistinct antemedial slightly waved oblique fuscous line, and more oblique narrow medial and two postmedial bands. A cell-speck is present, with a marginal specks series, and an indistinct marginal band. Hindwings with antemedial, postmedial, submarginal and marginal bands. Ventral side with fuscous suffusion in cell of forewings.
