= Kalore (beetle) =

Scientific classification
- Domain: Eukaryota
- Kingdom: Animalia
- Phylum: Arthropoda
- Class: Insecta
- Order: Coleoptera
- Suborder: Polyphaga
- Infraorder: Cucujiformia
- Family: Cerambycidae
- Subfamily: Cerambycinae
- Tribe: Xystrocerini
- Genus: Kalore; Martins & Galileo, 2006

Genus of beetles

Kalore is a genus of beetles in the family Cerambycidae, containing the following species:

- Kalore asanga Martins & Galileo, 2006
- Kalore minima Galileo & Martins, 2011
