= Mimoeme =

Scientific classification
- Kingdom: Animalia
- Phylum: Arthropoda
- Class: Insecta
- Order: Coleoptera
- Suborder: Polyphaga
- Infraorder: Cucujiformia
- Family: Cerambycidae
- Tribe: Xystrocerini
- Genus: Mimoeme

Genus of beetles

Mimoeme is a genus of beetles in the family Cerambycidae, containing the following species:

- Mimoeme lycoides Chemsak & Linsley, 1967
- Mimoeme pseudamerica Touroult, Dalens & Tavakilian, 2010
