= Stenoeme =

Scientific classification
- Kingdom: Animalia
- Phylum: Arthropoda
- Class: Insecta
- Order: Coleoptera
- Suborder: Polyphaga
- Infraorder: Cucujiformia
- Family: Cerambycidae
- Tribe: Xystrocerini
- Genus: Stenoeme; Gounelle, 1909

Genus of beetles

Stenoeme is a genus of beetles in the family Cerambycidae, containing the following species:

- Stenoeme aguilari Galileo & Martins, 2010
- Stenoeme annularis Martins, 1980
- Stenoeme bellarmini Gounelle, 1909
- Stenoeme iheringi Gounelle, 1909
- Stenoeme kempfi Martins, 1980
