= Paratemnopis =

Scientific classification
- Kingdom: Animalia
- Phylum: Arthropoda
- Class: Insecta
- Order: Coleoptera
- Suborder: Polyphaga
- Infraorder: Cucujiformia
- Family: Cerambycidae
- Subfamily: Cerambycinae
- Tribe: Xystrocerini
- Genus: Paratemnopis; Martins, 1978
- Species: P. ambigua

Binomial name
- Paratemnopis ambigua (Melzer, 1927)

Genus of beetles

Paratemnopis is a genus of typical longhorn beetles in the family Cerambycidae. This genus has a single species, Paratemnopis ambigua, found in Brazil.
