= Atenizus =

Scientific classification
- Kingdom: Animalia
- Phylum: Arthropoda
- Class: Insecta
- Order: Coleoptera
- Suborder: Polyphaga
- Infraorder: Cucujiformia
- Family: Cerambycidae
- Subfamily: Cerambycinae
- Tribe: Oemini
- Genus: Atenizus; Bates, 1867

Genus of beetles

Atenizus is a genus of beetles in the family Cerambycidae, containing the following species:

- Atenizus capixaba Martins, 1981
- Atenizus castaneus Martins, 1981
- Atenizus hylaeanus Martins, 1981
- Atenizus laticeps Bates, 1867
- Atenizus plaumanni Tippmann, 1960
- Atenizus simplex Bates, 1884
- Atenizus taunayi Melzer, 1920
