= Amphelissoeme =

Amphelissoeme viridescens

Scientific classification
- Kingdom: Animalia
- Phylum: Arthropoda
- Class: Insecta
- Order: Coleoptera
- Suborder: Polyphaga
- Infraorder: Cucujiformia
- Family: Cerambycidae
- Genus: Amphelissoeme
- Species: A. viridescens

Binomial name
- Amphelissoeme viridescens Martins, 1981

Genus of beetles

Amphelissoeme is a genus of beetles in the family Cerambycidae, containing a single species, Amphelissoeme viridescens.
