= Malacopterus =

Genus of beetles

{{Automatic_taxobox

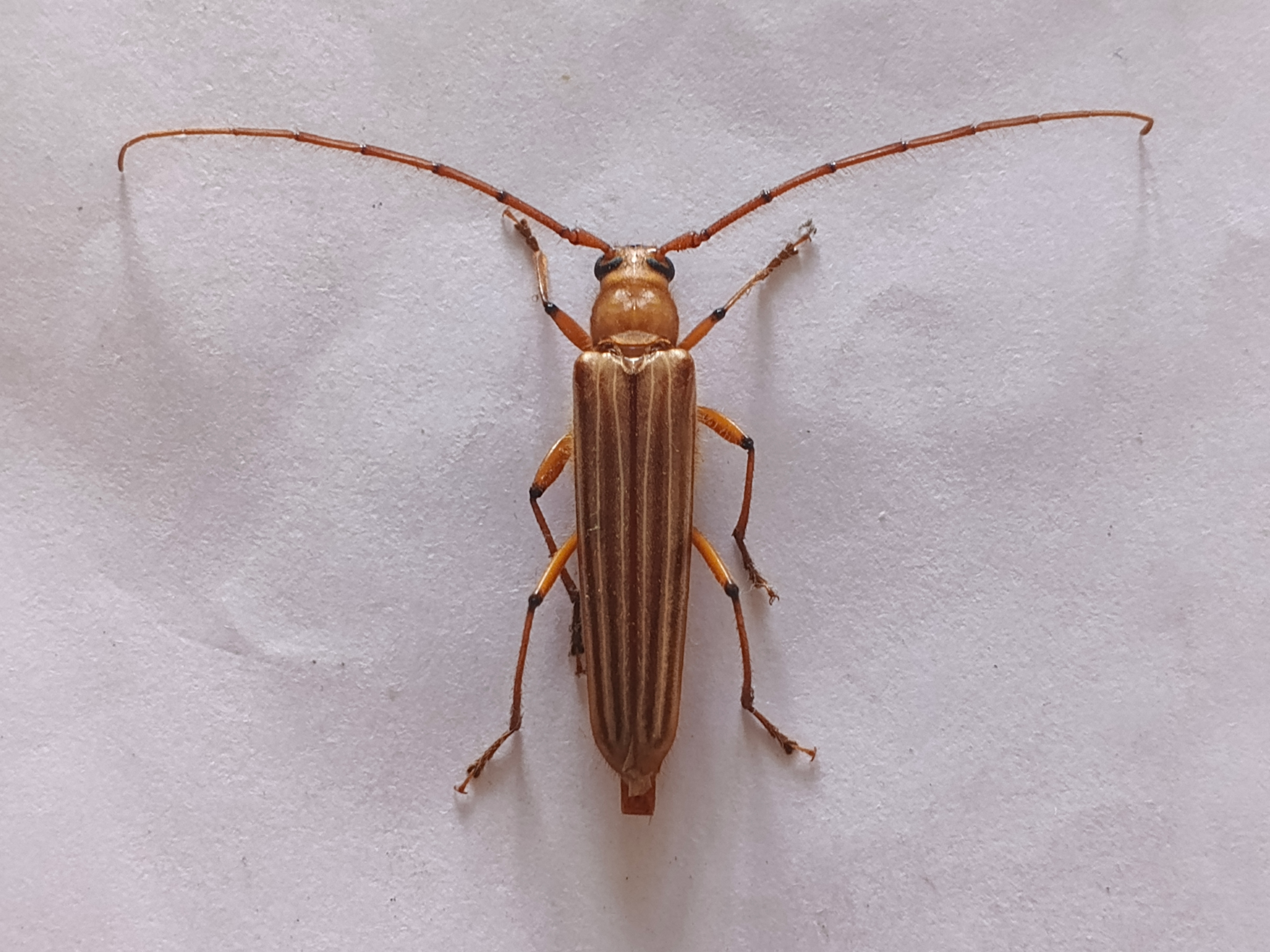
A Longhorn Beetle (Malacopterus) fotographed in Caracas, Venezuela

| taxon = Malacopterus | authority = }}

Malacopterus is a genus of beetles in the family Cerambycidae, containing the following species:

- Malacopterus pavidus (Germar, 1824)
- Malacopterus tenellus (Fabricius, 1801)
