= Paramartinsia =

Paramartinsia quadrimaculata

Scientific classification
- Kingdom: Animalia
- Phylum: Arthropoda
- Class: Insecta
- Order: Coleoptera
- Suborder: Polyphaga
- Infraorder: Cucujiformia
- Family: Cerambycidae
- Genus: Paramartinsia
- Species: P. quadrimaculata

Binomial name
- Paramartinsia quadrimaculata Martins & Galileo, 2005

Genus of beetles

Paramartinsia quadrimaculata is a species of beetles in the family Cerambycidae, the only species in the genus Paramartinsia.
