= Methicula =

Methicula dimidiata

Scientific classification
- Kingdom: Animalia
- Phylum: Arthropoda
- Class: Insecta
- Order: Coleoptera
- Suborder: Polyphaga
- Infraorder: Cucujiformia
- Family: Cerambycidae
- Genus: Methicula
- Species: M. dimidiata

Binomial name
- Methicula dimidiata Chemsak & Linsley, 1971

Genus of beetles

Methicula dimidiata is a species of beetle in the family Cerambycidae, the only species in the genus Methicula.
