= Methioides =

Methioides cicatricosa

Scientific classification
- Kingdom: Animalia
- Phylum: Arthropoda
- Class: Insecta
- Order: Coleoptera
- Suborder: Polyphaga
- Infraorder: Cucujiformia
- Family: Cerambycidae
- Genus: Methioides
- Species: M. cicatricosa

Binomial name
- Methioides cicatricosa Chemsak & Linsley, 1967

Genus of beetles

Methioides cicatricosa is a species of beetle in the family Cerambycidae, the only species in the genus Methioides.
