= Metalloeme =

Metalloeme viridescens

Scientific classification
- Kingdom: Animalia
- Phylum: Arthropoda
- Class: Insecta
- Order: Coleoptera
- Suborder: Polyphaga
- Infraorder: Cucujiformia
- Family: Cerambycidae
- Genus: Metalloeme
- Species: M. viridescens

Binomial name
- Metalloeme viridescens Touroult, Dalens & Tavakilian, 2010

Genus of beetles

Metalloeme viridescens is a species of beetle in the family Cerambycidae, the only species in the genus Metalloeme.
