= Vandykea =

Vandykea tuberculata

Scientific classification
- Kingdom: Animalia
- Phylum: Arthropoda
- Class: Insecta
- Order: Coleoptera
- Suborder: Polyphaga
- Infraorder: Cucujiformia
- Family: Cerambycidae
- Genus: Vandykea
- Species: V. tuberculata

Binomial name
- Vandykea tuberculata Linsley, 1932

Genus of beetles

Vandykea tuberculata is a species of beetle in the family Cerambycidae, the only species in the genus Vandykea.
