= Eudistenia =

Eudistenia costipennis

Scientific classification
- Kingdom: Animalia
- Phylum: Arthropoda
- Class: Insecta
- Order: Coleoptera
- Suborder: Polyphaga
- Infraorder: Cucujiformia
- Family: Cerambycidae
- Genus: Eudistenia
- Species: E. costipennis

Binomial name
- Eudistenia costipennis Fall, 1907

Genus of beetles

Eudistenia costipennis is a species of beetle in the family Cerambycidae, the only species in the genus Eudistenia.
