= Methioeme =

Methioeme brevipennis

Scientific classification
- Kingdom: Animalia
- Phylum: Arthropoda
- Class: Insecta
- Order: Coleoptera
- Suborder: Polyphaga
- Infraorder: Cucujiformia
- Family: Cerambycidae
- Genus: Methioeme
- Species: M. brevipennis

Binomial name
- Methioeme brevipennis Zajciw, 1963

Genus of beetles

Methioeme brevipennis is a species of beetle in the family Cerambycidae, the only species in the genus Methioeme.
