= Euryprosopus =

Scientific classification
- Kingdom: Animalia
- Phylum: Arthropoda
- Clade: Pancrustacea
- Class: Insecta
- Order: Coleoptera
- Suborder: Polyphaga
- Infraorder: Cucujiformia
- Family: Cerambycidae
- Genus: Euryprosopus
- Species: E. clavipes

Binomial name
- Euryprosopus clavipes White, 1853

Genus of beetles

Euryprosopus clavipes is a species of beetle in the family Cerambycidae, the only species in the genus Euryprosopus.
