= Nesoeme =

Nesoeme kuscheli

Scientific classification
- Kingdom: Animalia
- Phylum: Arthropoda
- Class: Insecta
- Order: Coleoptera
- Suborder: Polyphaga
- Infraorder: Cucujiformia
- Family: Cerambycidae
- Genus: Nesoeme
- Species: N. kuscheli

Binomial name
- Nesoeme kuscheli Linsley & Chemsak, 1966

Genus of beetles

Nesoeme kuscheli is a species of beetle in the family Cerambycidae, the only species in the genus Nesoeme.
