= Xanthoeme =

Xanthoeme signaticornis

Scientific classification
- Kingdom: Animalia
- Phylum: Arthropoda
- Clade: Pancrustacea
- Class: Insecta
- Order: Coleoptera
- Suborder: Polyphaga
- Infraorder: Cucujiformia
- Family: Cerambycidae
- Genus: Xanthoeme
- Species: X. signaticornis

Binomial name
- Xanthoeme signaticornis (Melzer, 1920)

Genus of beetles

Xanthoeme signaticornis is a species of beetle in the family Cerambycidae, the only species in the genus Xanthoeme.
