= Cyanomethia =

Cyanomethia pseudothonalmus

Scientific classification
- Kingdom: Animalia
- Phylum: Arthropoda
- Class: Insecta
- Order: Coleoptera
- Suborder: Polyphaga
- Infraorder: Cucujiformia
- Family: Cerambycidae
- Genus: Cyanomethia
- Species: C. pseudothonalmus

Binomial name
- Cyanomethia pseudothonalmus Philips & Ivie, 1998

Genus of beetles

Cyanomethia pseudothonalmus is a species of beetle in the family Cerambycidae, the only species in the genus Cyanomethia.
