= Chromoeme =

Chromoeme angustissima

Scientific classification
- Kingdom: Animalia
- Phylum: Arthropoda
- Class: Insecta
- Order: Coleoptera
- Suborder: Polyphaga
- Infraorder: Cucujiformia
- Family: Cerambycidae
- Genus: Chromoeme
- Species: C. angustissima

Binomial name
- Chromoeme angustissima (Buquet, 1857)

Genus of beetles

Chromoeme angustissima is a species of beetle in the family Cerambycidae, the only species in the genus Chromoeme.
