= Gounelleoeme =

Gounelleoeme echinoscapus

Scientific classification
- Kingdom: Animalia
- Phylum: Arthropoda
- Class: Insecta
- Order: Coleoptera
- Suborder: Polyphaga
- Infraorder: Cucujiformia
- Family: Cerambycidae
- Genus: Gounelleoeme
- Species: G. echinoscapus

Binomial name
- Gounelleoeme echinoscapus (Gounelle, 1913)

Genus of beetles

Gounelleoeme echinoscapus is a species of beetle in the family Cerambycidae, the only species in the genus Gounelleoeme.
