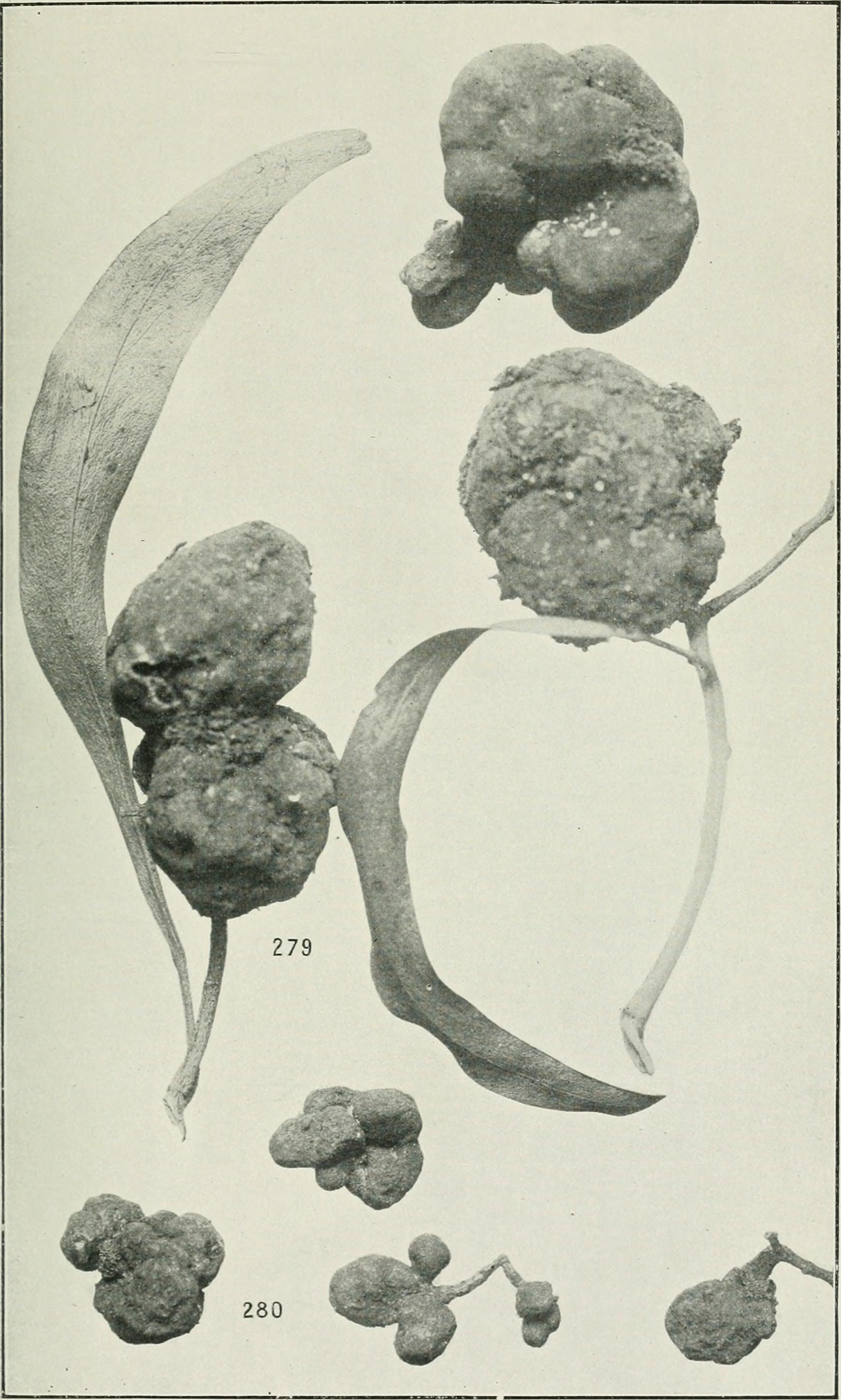
- E. tepperianum on Acacia armata & A. pycnantha

Scientific classification
- Kingdom: Fungi
- Division: Basidiomycota
- Class: Pucciniomycetes
- Order: Pucciniales
- Family: Pileolariaceae
- Genus: Uromycladium; McAlpine (1905)

Type species
- Uromycladium simplex McAlpine (1905)

Species
- ~11

= Uromycladium =

Genus of fungi

Uromycladium is a genus of rust fungi in the family Pileolariaceae. It was circumscribed by mycologist Daniel McAlpine in 1905. The genus was established by McAlpine for rusts on Acacia (Fabaceae, subfamily Mimosoideae) with teliospores that clustered at the top of a pedicel.

The genus contains at least 11 species. Some of these species infect plants in the family Mimosoideae including Acacia, Paraserianthes and Falcataria. Most species are considered to be specific to only one host species of plant, such as Uromycladium simplex on Acacia pycnantha and Uromycladium falcatarium on Falcataria moluccana. Uromycladium tepperianum, on the other hand, has almost 100 known hosts including plants from several tribes of Mimosoideae. However, research suggests that this species may comprise several unrecognized taxa with narrower host ranges.

== Species ==
Species include:

- Uromycladium acaciae (Cooke) P.Syd. & Syd., 1914.
- Uromycladium alpinum McAlpine, 1906.
- Uromycladium bisporum McAlpine, 1906.
- Uromycladium cubense Arthur & J.R.Johnst., 1918.
- Uromycladium falcatarium Doungsa-ard, et al., 2015. Present in Philippines, Malaysia, Indonesia, and Timor Leste
- Uromycladium fusisporum (Cooke & Massee) Savile, 1971. Present in Australia
- Uromycladium maritimum McAlpine, 1905.
- Uromycladium morrisii Doungsa-ard, McTaggart, Geering & RG Shivas, 2018. Native to Australia, introduced to South Africa as a biological control agent
- Uromycladium naracoortensis
- Uromycladium notabile (F.Ludw.) McAlpine, 1906. Present in Australia
- Uromycladium robinsonii McAlpine, 1906. Present in Australia
- Uromycladium simplex McAlpine, 1905. Present in Australia
- Uromycladium tepperianum (Sacc.) McAlpine, 1905. Present in Australia, Philippines, Malaysia, Indonesia, Timor Leste. Introduced to South Africa.

== Ecology ==
The rust fungi in the genus Uromycladium typically form enlarged galls at the end of actively growing plant tissues. These galls can be a significant disease limiting the growth and survival of trees planted for commercial tree plantations and agroforestry. The acacia gall rust fungus species Uromycladium tepperianum has been introduced to South Africa as a biological control on the invasive Australian shrub Acacia saligna.

The galls of Uromycladium tepperianum have been reported to be used by moths in the families Gracillariidae, Tortricidae, Tineidae, Pyralidae, and Stathmopodidae as food sources and domatium for their larvae in Australia. Specifically in the family Gracillariidae the species Polysoma eumetalla and Conopomorpha heliopla are found feeding on the surface of various species of acacia rust galls. Erechthias mystacinella and Opogona comptella moth larvae from the family Tineidae have been reported to live and feed on the inside of Uromycladium tepperianum galls.
