= Uromycladium falcatarium =

Scientific classification
- Kingdom: Fungi
- Division: Basidiomycota
- Class: Pucciniomycetes
- Order: Pucciniales
- Family: Pileolariaceae
- Genus: Uromycladium
- Species: U. falcatarium

Binomial name
- Uromycladium falcatarium Doungsa-ard, McTaggart & Shivas (2015)

Species of fungus

Uromycladium falcatarium (falcataria gall rust fungus) is a species of rust fungus in the genus Uromycladium. It was circumscribed by mycologists Doungsa-ard, McTaggart & Shivasin in 2015.

The species infects the Fabaceae tree Falcataria moluccana (= Paraserianthes falcataria) in south-east Asia.

== Taxonomy and host specificity ==
Falcataria gall rust fungus (Uromycladium falcatarium) is potentially specific to only one host plant, Falcataria moluccana. However, U. falcatarium is closely related to the acacia gall rust fungus U. tepperianum, which has almost 100 known hosts including plants from several tribes of Mimosoideae. Research suggests that U. tepperianum may comprise several unrecognized taxa with greater levels of host specificity. It is uncertain if previous reports of Uromycladium fungal infections reported on F. moluccana are from U. tepperianum or U. falcatarium. For example, laboratory studies that manually inoculated F. moluccana and Acacia mangium with Uromycladium fungal spores collected from F. moluccana in Yogyakarta, Indonesia were only infectious on the sengon leaves and spores did not penetrate the A. mangium leaves. The authors of this last study considered these spores to be from U. tepperianum but did not report how they determined the identity of the fungus used for their experiments.

== Distribution ==
Uromycladium falcatarium has been reported from Indonesia, Malaysia, Philippines, and Timor Leste primarily from areas where its host tree F. moluccana is cultivated for timber production. First reported in the Philippines in 1990 falcataria rust gall fungus disease spread to Sabah, Malaysia in 1992, and to Indonesia starting in 1997 on Seram island Maluku Province, Java in 2004 and Bali in 2006. In 1999 an epidemic outbreak in East Timor spread throughout the coffee-growing districts where F. moluccana is planted as shade trees for the coffee plants. It is predicted that this disease will continue to spread westward with the prevailing trade winds. Rust gall infested trees with similar symptoms have also been found from the native range of F. moluccana elsewhere in the Maluku Islands and New Guinea (including Papua New Guinea).
