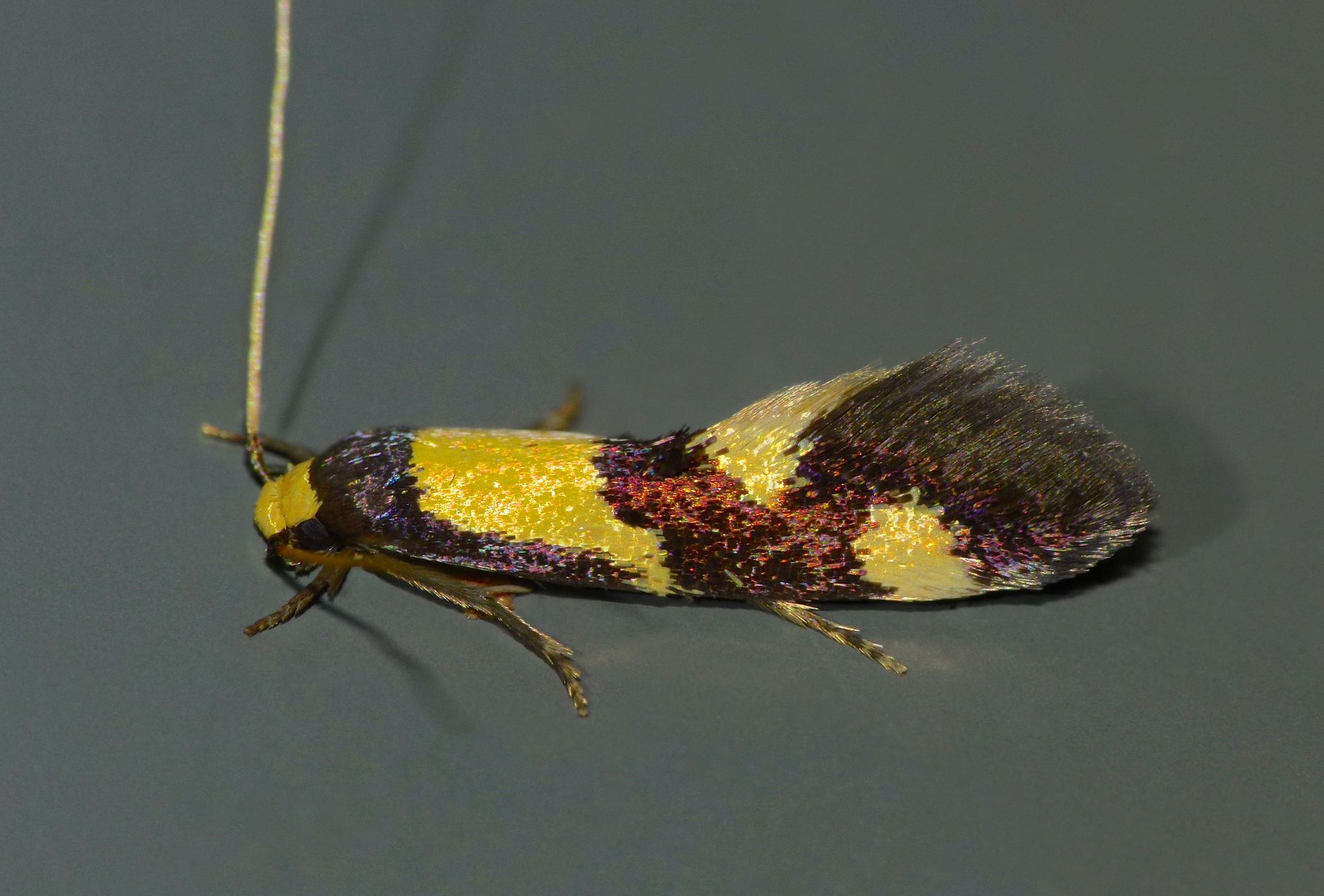

Scientific classification
- Kingdom: Animalia
- Phylum: Arthropoda
- Class: Insecta
- Order: Lepidoptera
- Family: Tineidae
- Genus: Opogona
- Species: O. comptella

Binomial name
- Opogona comptella (Walker, 1864)

Synonyms
- Tinea comptella Walker, 1864

= Opogona comptella =

Species of moth

Opogona comptella is a species of moth in the family Tineidae. It is found in New Zealand and in Australia from southern Queensland to Tasmania.

The wingspan is about 15 mm.

The larvae feed on the bark of Salix vitellina and the galls of Acacia dealbata (caused by the rust fungus Uromycladium tepperianum) and Acacia melanoxylon (caused by the fly Cecidomyia acaciaelongifoliae).
