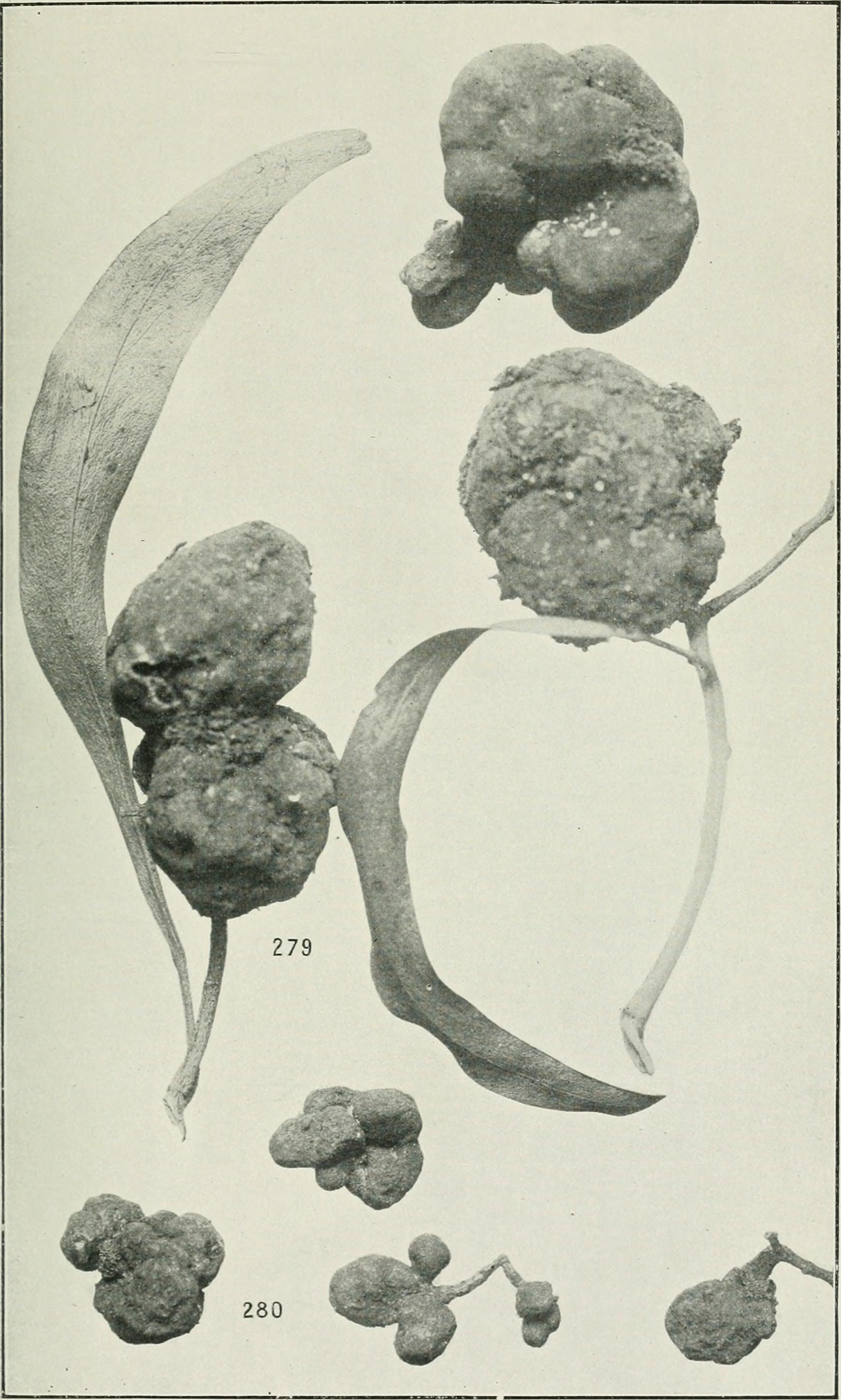

Scientific classification
- Kingdom: Fungi
- Division: Basidiomycota
- Class: Pucciniomycetes
- Order: Pucciniales
- Family: Pileolariaceae
- Genus: Uromycladium
- Species: U. tepperianum

Binomial name
- Uromycladium tepperianum (Sacc.) McAlpine (1906)

Synonyms
- Uromyces tepperianus Sacc. (1889); Coeomurus tepperianus (Sacc.) Kuntze (1898)

= Uromycladium tepperianum =

Species of fungus

Uromycladium tepperianum is a rust fungus that infects over 100 species of Acacia and related genera including Paraserianthes in Australia, south-east Asia, the south Pacific and New Zealand. The acacia gall rust fungus species Uromycladium tepperianum has been introduced to South Africa as a biological control on the invasive Australian shrub Acacia saligna.

Uromycladium tepperianum is differentiated from other species of Uromycladium by the presence of three one-celled fertile teliospores on the pedicel.

== Distribution ==
The fungus is present in Australia, Philippines, Malaysia, Indonesia, Timor Leste, and New Zealand. It was introduced deliberately to South Africa for biological control.

== Ecology ==
The galls of Uromycladium tepperianum have been reported to be used by moths in the families Gracillariidae, Tortricidae, Tineidae, Pyralidae, and Stathmopodidae as food sources and domatium for their larvae in Australia. Specifically in the family Gracillariidae the species Polysoma eumetalla and Conopomorpha heliopla are found feeding on the surface of various species of acacia rust galls. Erechthias mystacinella and Opogona comptella moth larvae from the family Tineidae have been reported to live and feed on the inside of U. tepperianum galls.
