= Polysoma eumetalla =

Scientific classification
- Kingdom: Animalia
- Phylum: Arthropoda
- Class: Insecta
- Order: Lepidoptera
- Family: Gracillariidae
- Genus: Polysoma
- Species: P. eumetalla

Binomial name
- Polysoma eumetalla (Meyrick, 1880)

Synonyms
- Gracilaria eumetalla Meyrick, 1880; Acrocercops eumetalla Turner, 1894

Species of moth

Polysoma eumetalla is a moth of the family Gracillariidae. It is known from the Australian states of Queensland, New South Wales, South Australia, Tasmania and Victoria and from New Zealand.

The wingspan is about 10 mm. Adults have a metallic gold colour with white markings.

The larvae feed in galls on Acacia dealbata, caused by the rust fungus Uromycladium tepperianum and in galls on Acacia melanoxylon, caused by the fly Cecidomyia acaciaelongifoliae.
