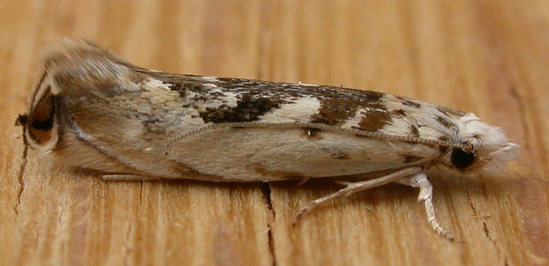

Scientific classification
- Kingdom: Animalia
- Phylum: Arthropoda
- Clade: Pancrustacea
- Class: Insecta
- Order: Lepidoptera
- Family: Tineidae
- Genus: Erechthias
- Species: E. mystacinella

Binomial name
- Erechthias mystacinella Walker, 1864

Synonyms
- Mocomedica mystacinella

= Erechthias mystacinella =

Curve-winged apple moth

Species of moth

Erechthias mystacinella, the curve-winged apple moth, is a moth of the family Tineidae. It is found in the Australian Capital Territory, Tasmania and Victoria.

== Description ==
The wingspan is about 14 mm.

The larvae have been found feeding and living inside galls and damaged stems caused by Uromycladium tepperianum, Cecidomyia acaciaelongifoliae, and Schizoneura lanigera and on various plants and trees, including Malus domestica, Acacia dealbata and Acacia melanoxylon.
