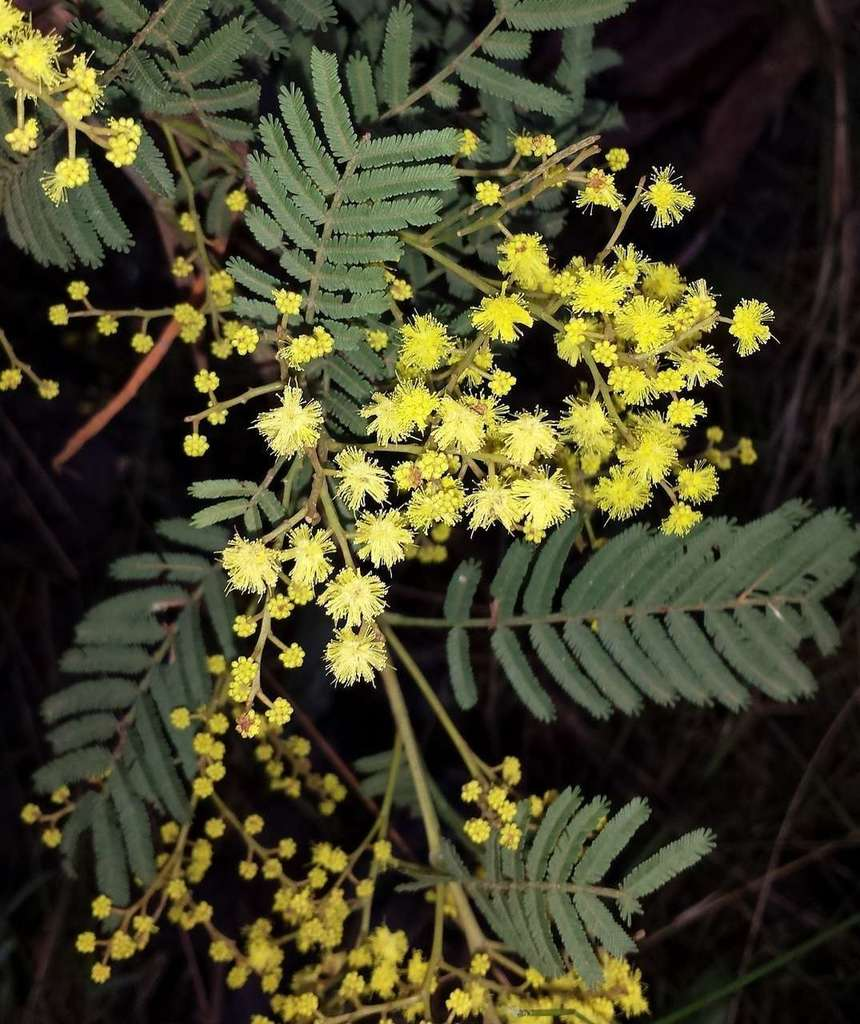
- Near Romsey in the Macedon Ranges

Scientific classification
- Kingdom: Plantae
- Clade: Tracheophytes
- Clade: Angiosperms
- Clade: Eudicots
- Clade: Rosids
- Order: Fabales
- Family: Fabaceae
- Subfamily: Caesalpinioideae
- Clade: Mimosoid clade
- Genus: Acacia
- Species: A. nanodealbata

Binomial name
- Acacia nanodealbata J.H.Willis
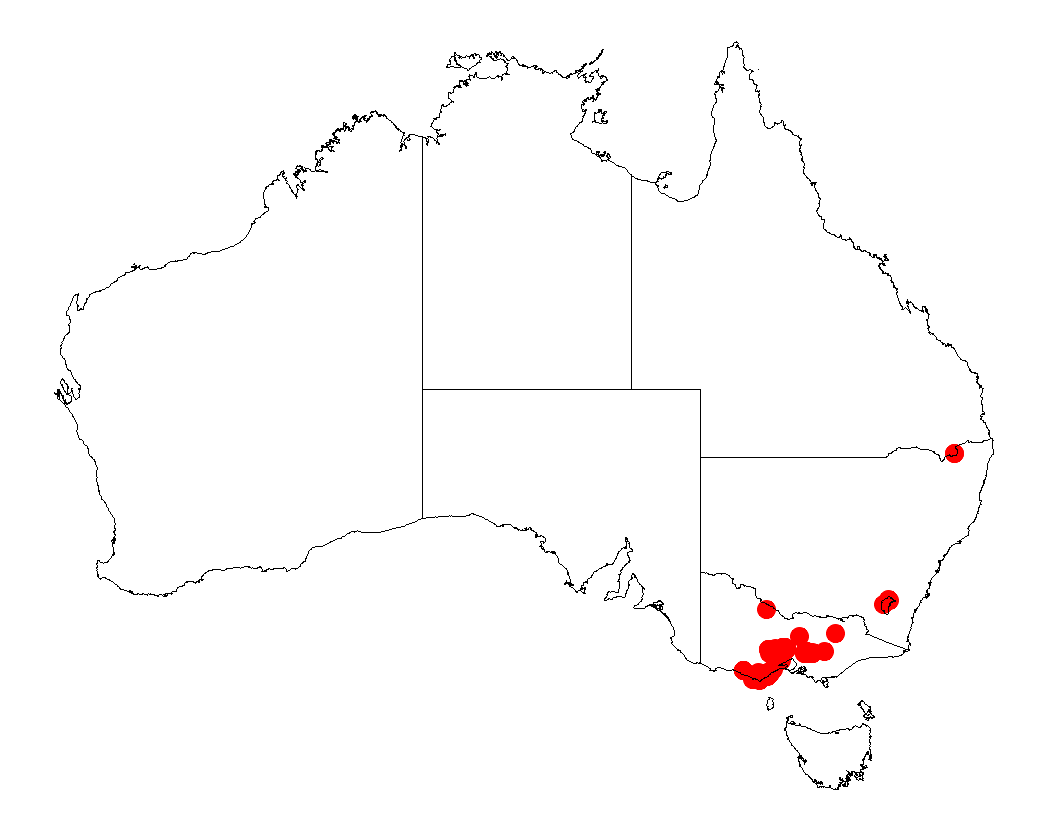
- Occurrence data from AVH

Synonyms
- Racosperma nanodealbatum (J.H.Willis) Pedley

= Acacia nanodealbata =

Species of legume

Acacia nanodealbata, known colloquially as dwarf silver-wattle, is a species of flowering plant in the family Fabaceae, and is endemic to Victoria, Australia. It is a tree with smooth, silvery or grey bark, ridged, glabrous, purplish black or reddish brown branchlets, bipinnate leaves, spherical heads of golden yellow flowers arranged in racemes, and thinly leathery, purplish blue or reddish brown pods, irregularly constricted between the seeds.

== Description ==
Acacia nanodealbata is a tree that typically grows to a height of 2–6 m (6 ft 7 in – 19 ft 8 in) and has smooth, silvery or grey bark, and terete, glabrous branchlets angled towards the outer end, occasionally with purplish black or reddish brown hairs pressed against the surface. The leaves are bipinnate on a rachis 20–115 mm (0.79–4.53 in) long on a petiole 5–16 mm (0.20–0.63 in) long, with 6 to 26 pinna mostly 10–30 mm (0.39–1.18 in) long, the lower pinnae smaller. Each pinna has 9 to 34 pairs of closely spaced, narrowly oblong to oblong pinnules 1–2.5 mm (0.039–0.098 in) long and 0.4–0.8 mm (0.016–0.031 in) wide. The flowers are borne in spherical heads in racemes in leaf axils or in panicles on the ends of branchlets, each head with usually 12 to 20 golden yellow flowers. Flowering occurs from August to October, and the pods are 30–85 mm (1.2–3.3 in) long, 9–20 mm (0.35–0.79 in) wide, purplish blue or reddish brown, thinly leathery and straight-sided to irregularly constricted between the seeds.

This species differs from Acacia dealbata in having crowded, almost glabrous pinnules that are less than 2.5 mm (0.098 in) long and the overall aspect of the tree is generally greener than A. dealbata.

== Taxonomy ==
Acacia nanodealbata was first formally described in 1957 by James Hamlyn Willis in The Victorian Naturalist from specimens collected on Poley Hill in a reserve about 10 mi (16 km) north-east of Warburton in 1954. The specific epithet (nanodealbata) means 'dwarf dealbata', but it is rarely of the 'dwarf' habit and often of similar stature to A. dealbata.

== Distribution and habitat ==
Dwarf silver-wattle usually grows in large stands in subalpine eucalypt forest or in tall open forest in the central highlands from the Healesville–Warburton area, the top of Mount Macedon and the Otway Range further south.

== Conservation status ==
Acacia nanodealbata is listed as 'Vulnerable' under the Victorian Government Flora and Fauna Guarantee Act.
