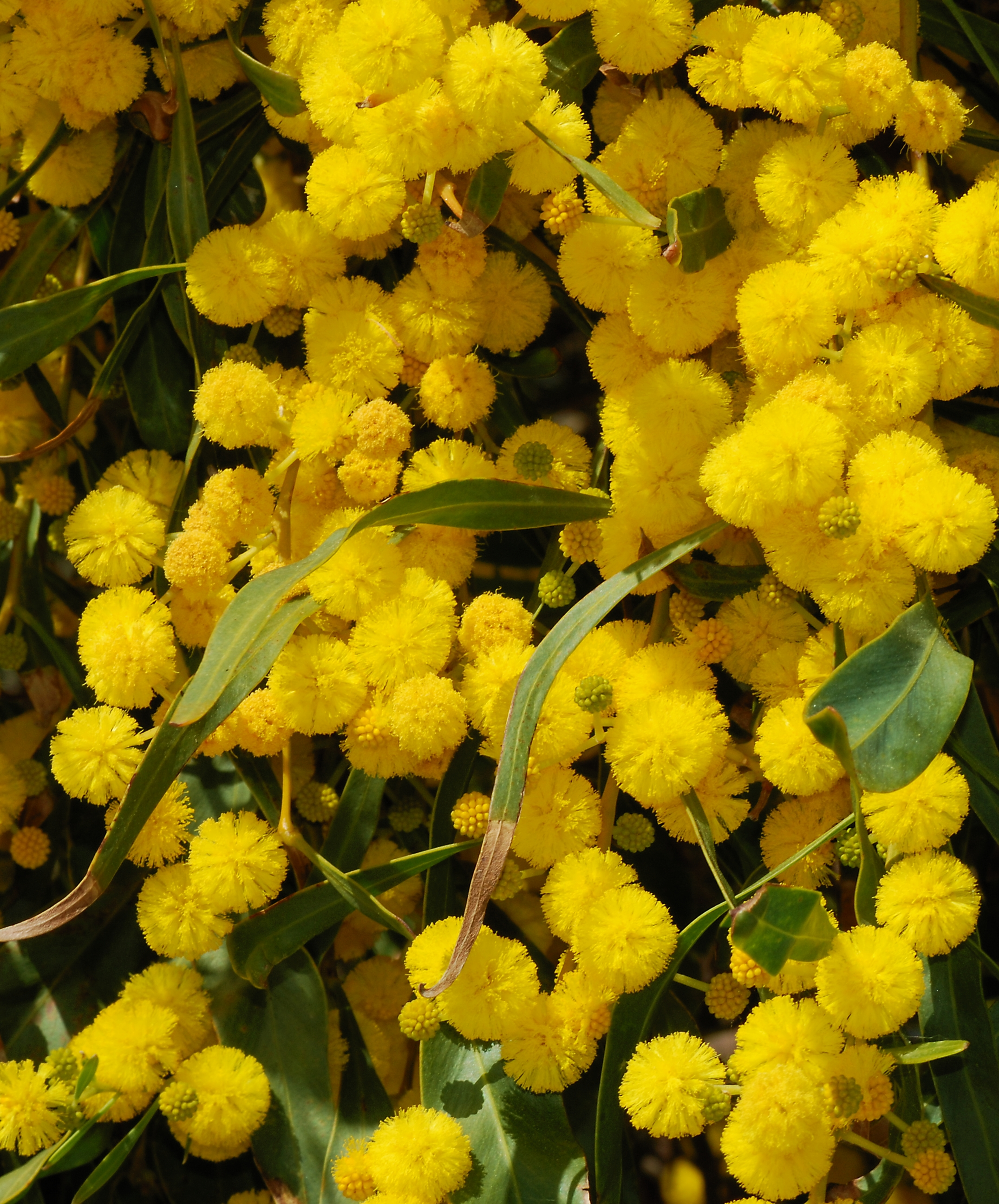

Scientific classification
- Kingdom: Plantae
- Clade: Embryophytes
- Clade: Tracheophytes
- Clade: Angiosperms
- Clade: Eudicots
- Clade: Rosids
- Order: Fabales
- Family: Fabaceae
- Subfamily: Caesalpinioideae
- Clade: Mimosoid clade
- Genus: Acacia
- Species: A. saligna

Binomial name
- Acacia saligna (Labill.) H.L.Wendl.
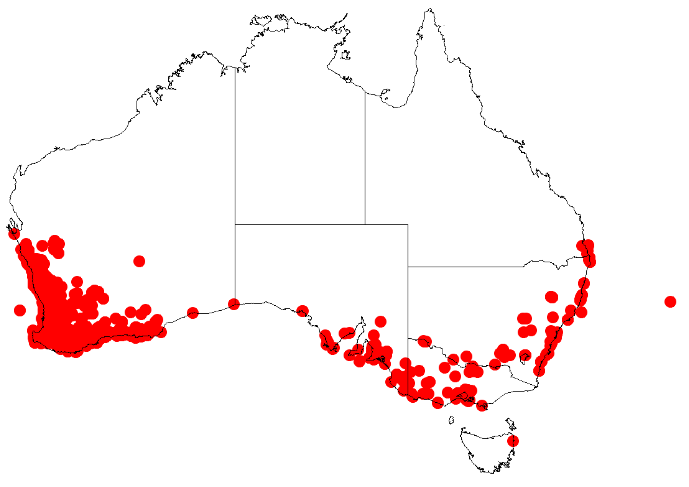
- Australian occurrence data from AVH

Synonyms
- Acacia cyanophylla Lindley

= Acacia saligna =

Species of plant native to Australia

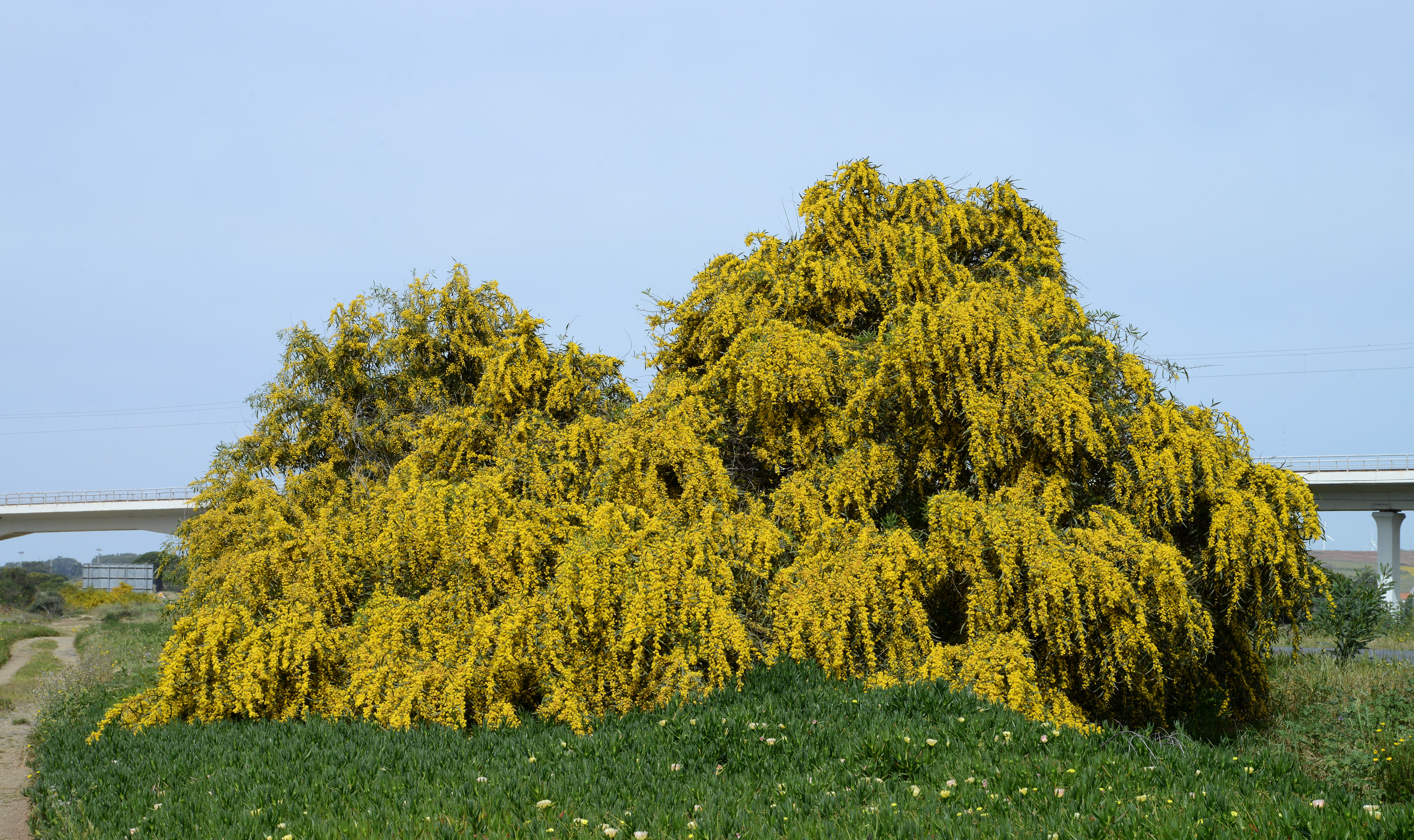
Habit in Portugal

Acacia saligna, commonly known by various names including coojong, golden wreath wattle, willow wattle, orange wattle, blue-leafed wattle, Western Australian golden wattle, and, in Africa, Port Jackson willow, is a small tree in the family Fabaceae. Native to Australia, it is widely distributed throughout the south west corner of Western Australia, extending north as far as the Murchison River, and east to Israelite Bay. The Noongar peoples know the tree as Cujong.

== Description ==
Acacia saligna grows as a small, dense, spreading tree with a short trunk and a weeping habit. It grows up to 8 metres (26 ft) tall. Like many Acacia species, it has phyllodes rather than true leaves; these can be from 8 centimetres (3.1 in) up to 25 centimetres (9.8 in) long. At the base of each phyllode is a nectary gland, which secretes a sugary fluid. This attracts ants, which are believed to reduce the numbers of leaf-eating insects. The yellow flowers appear in late winter and early spring, in groups of up to ten bright yellow spherical flower heads. The fruit is a legume, while the seed is oblong and dark to black in colour.

A natural colonizer, Coojong tends to grow wherever soil has been disturbed, such as alongside new roads. Its seeds are distributed by ants, which store them in their nests to eat the seed-stalks. Disturbance of the soil brings them to the surface and allows them to germinate. Seeds germinate readily, and hundreds of seedlings can sometimes be found beneath a single parent tree. It is also extremely vigorous when young, often growing over 1 metre (3 ft 3 in) per year.

== Uses ==
Acacia saligna can be used for multiple purposes, as it grows under a wide range of soil conditions into a woody shrub or tree. It has been used for tanning, revegetation, animal fodder, mine site rehabilitation, firewood, mulch, agroforestry and as a decorative plant.

Acacia saligna has been planted extensively in semi-arid areas of Africa, South America and the Middle East as windbreaks and for stabilisation of sand dunes or erosion.

== Invasive potential ==
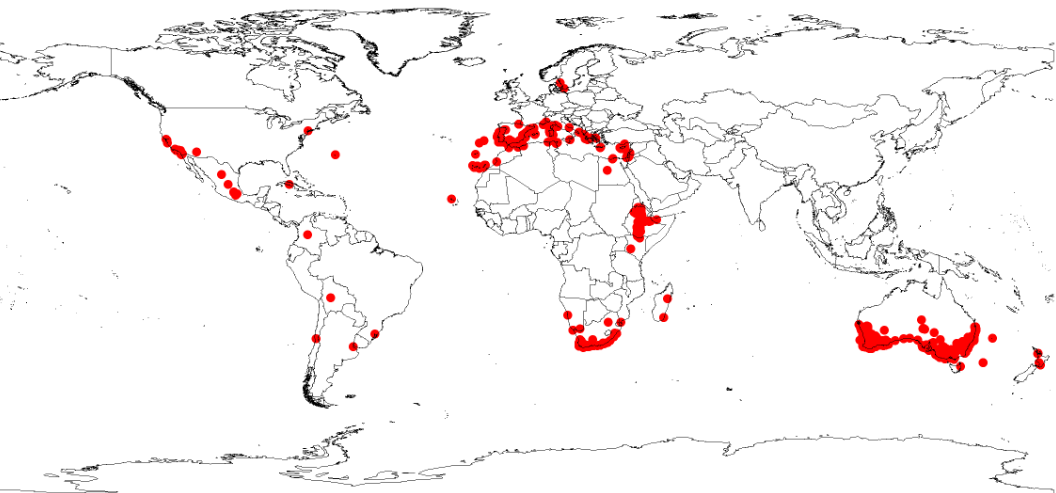
Acacia saligna GBIF.org: occurrence data

Acacia saligna has become an invasive species outside its natural range due to the following contributing factors:

- Widespread planting outside its native area
- Rapid growth in soil with low levels of nutrients
- Early reproductive maturity
- Large quantity of seeds produced
- Ability of seeds to survive fire
- Ability to germinate after cutting or burning
- Tolerance to many different substrates
- Nitrogen fixation
- Extensive root system
- Taller growth (by more than 3 m in some places) than indigenous plants

It was planted in the northern suburbs of Sydney in the 1950s, and has subsequently become a major weed in eastern New South Wales, Victoria and South Australia.

Since 2019, the species is included on the list of invasive alien species of Union concern. This means that the species can no longer be imported in the European Union. Additionally, it has become illegal to plant it, breed it, transport it, or bring it into the wild.

=== Environmental impact in South Africa ===
In South Africa, it proliferated at an uncontrollable rate, having been introduced in the nineteenth century to produce tan bark and to stabilise the sands of the Cape Flats outside Cape Town after the indigenous bush had largely been cut down for firewood. In addition to replacing indigenous fynbos vegetation, it also hampers agriculture. It is listed as an invasive alien plant in the Cape Floristic Region of South Africa, where it has displaced native species through changing fire regimes. The introduction of the acacia gall rust fungus (Uromycladium tepperianum) has proven to be highly effective at reining it in, reducing density by 80%. The acacia seed weevil (Melanterius species) was introduced in 2001 and has now (in 2007) reached the stage where there are sufficient numbers available to begin its distribution.

== See also ==
- Acacia pycnantha (also known as "golden wattle")
- List of Acacia species
