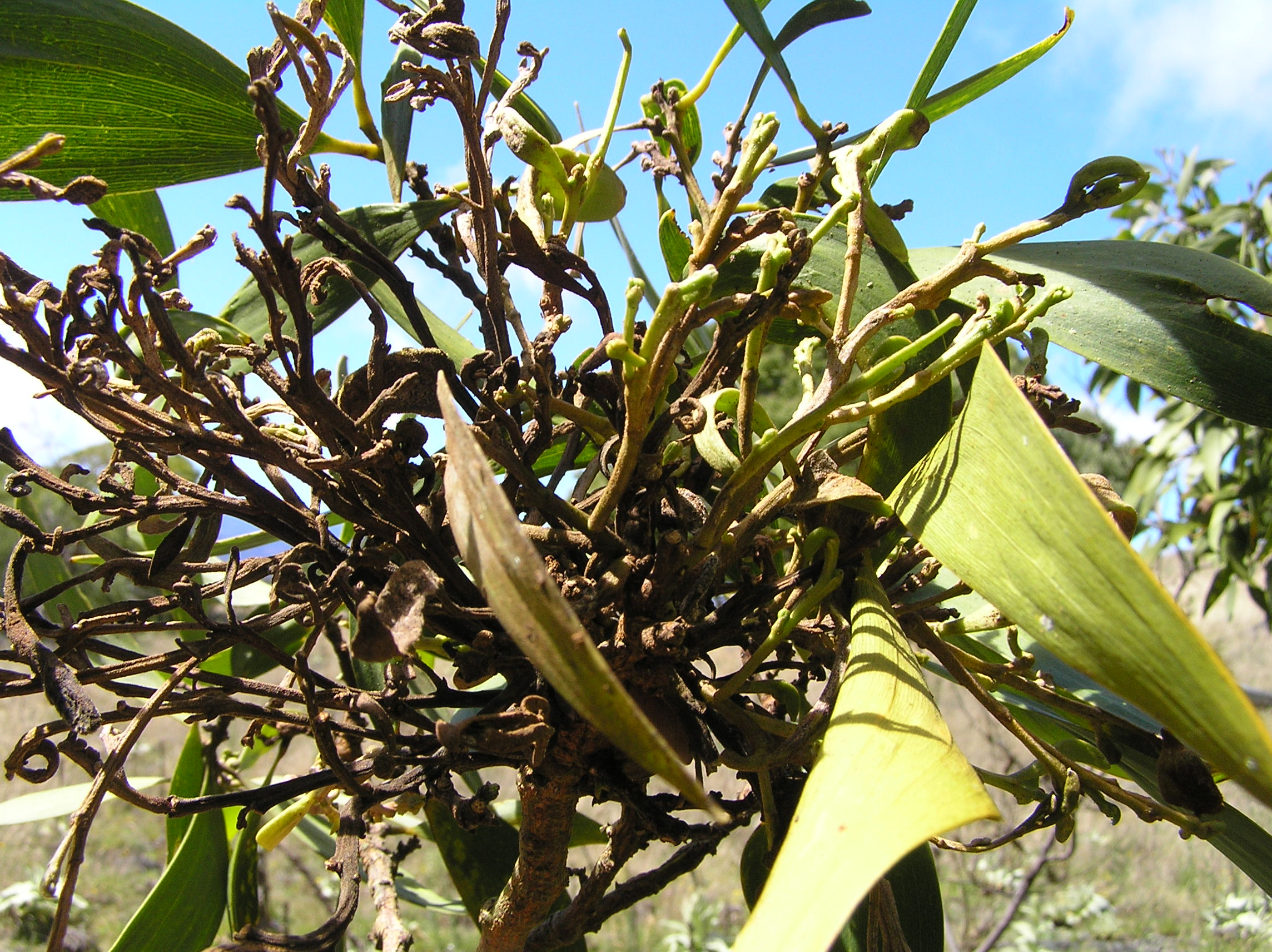
- Koa rust caused by Atelocauda angustiphyllodia

Scientific classification
- Kingdom: Fungi
- Division: Basidiomycota
- Class: Pucciniomycetes
- Order: Pucciniales
- Family: Pileolariaceae (Arthur) Cummins & Y.Hirats. (1983)

Type genus
- Pileolaria Castagne (1842)

Genera
- Atelocauda; Macalpinia; Pileolaria; Skierka; Uromycladium

= Pileolariaceae =

Family of fungi

The Pileolariaceae are a family of rust fungi in the order Pucciniales. A 2008 estimate places contains 4 genera and 34 species in the family.
