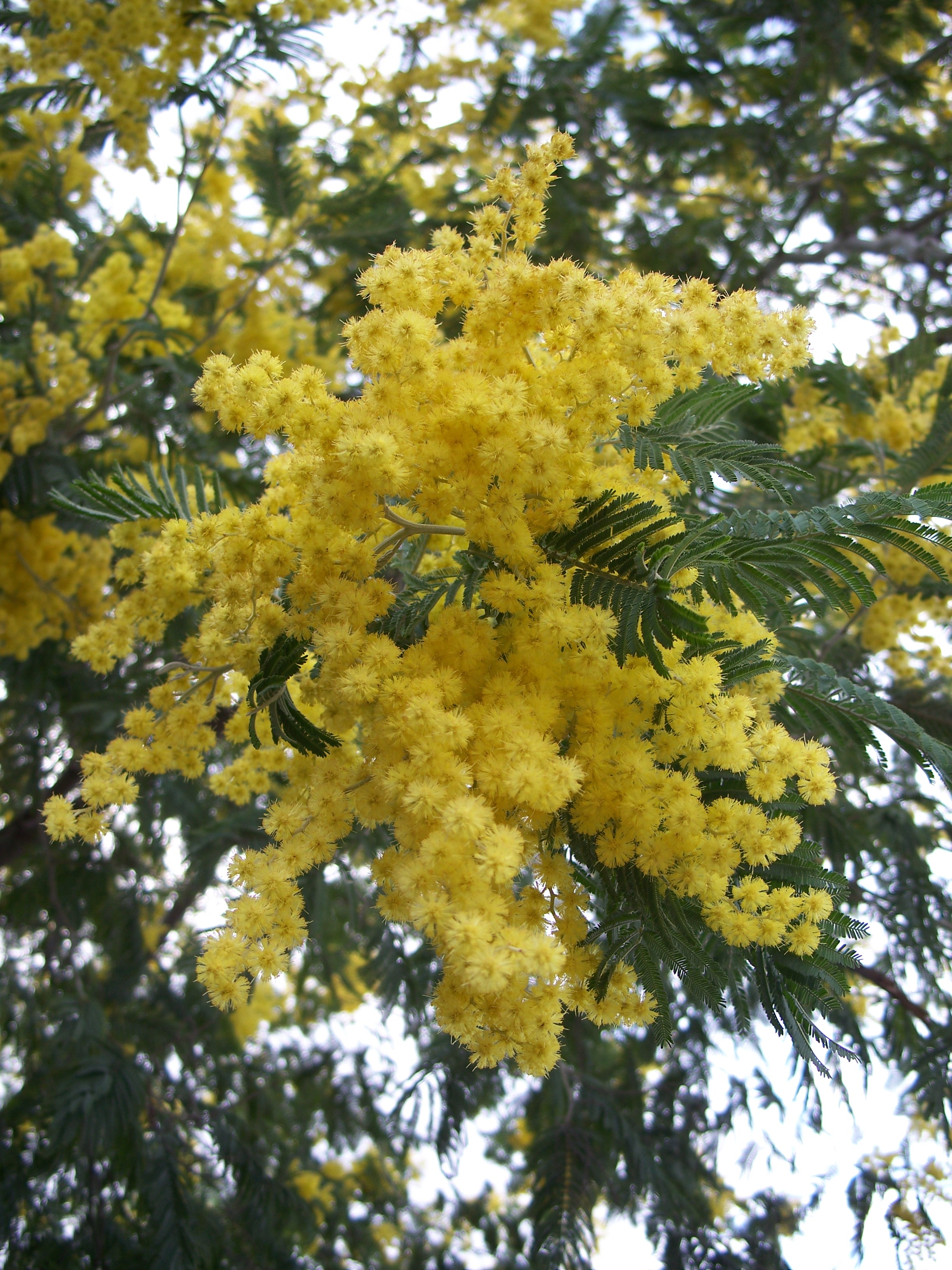
- Foliage and flowers

Scientific classification
- Kingdom: Plantae
- Clade: Embryophytes
- Clade: Tracheophytes
- Clade: Angiosperms
- Clade: Eudicots
- Clade: Rosids
- Order: Fabales
- Family: Fabaceae
- Subfamily: Caesalpinioideae
- Clade: Mimosoid clade
- Genus: Acacia
- Species: A. dealbata

Binomial name
- Acacia dealbata Link

Synonyms
- List: Acacia decurrens f. mollis (Lindl.) Benth.; Acacia decurrens var. dealbata (Link) F.Muell. ex Maiden; Acacia decurrens var. mollis Lindl.; Acacia decurrens var. mollissima Miège nom. illeg.; Acacia derwentii Siebert & Voss nom. inval., pro syn.; Acacia mollissima E.Miege nom. illeg.; Acacia puberula Dehnh.; Acacia subdealbata Pedley orth. var.; Racosperma dealbatum (Link) Pedley

= Acacia dealbata =

Species of flowering plant

Acacia dealbata, commonly known as silver wattle, blue wattle or mimosa, is a species of flowering plant in the legume family, Fabaceae. It is endemic to south-eastern mainland Australia but it can be found as an introduced or invasive species elsewhere. It is a bushy shrub or spreading tree with smooth bark, bluish grey or silvery and glaucous bipinnate leaves, spherical heads of yellow to bright yellow flowers, and straight to slightly curved pods. The Wiradjuri people of New South Wales use the name giigandul for the species.

== Description ==
Acacia dealbata is an erect, bushy shrub or spreading tree that typically grows to a height up to 30 m (98 ft) and has smooth grey, brown or dark brown bark, deeply corrugated when old. The leaves are bipinnate, on a petiole up to 15 mm (0.59 in) long, with 6 to 30 pairs of pinnae, each with 10 to 68 pairs of narrowly oblong to linear pinnules 0.7–5 mm (0.028–0.197 in) long and 0.4–0.8 mm (0.016–0.031 in) wide. The leaves are bluish grey or silvery and glaucous. The flowers are borne in spherical heads in racemes or in panicle-like groups on a hairy peduncle 2–10 mm (0.079–0.394 in) long, each head with 13 to 42 yellow to bright yellow flowers. Flowering occurs from July to November, and the pods are straight to slightly curved, more or less flat and often slightly constricted between some or all of the seeds, slightly leathery, blue or purplish, with a white, powdery bloom.

== Taxonomy ==
Acacia dealbata was first formally described in 1822 by Johann Heinrich Friedrich Link in his Enumeratio Plantarum Horti Botanici Regii Berolinensis Altera.

Along with other bipinnate wattles, A. dealbata is classified in the section Botrycephalae within the subgenus Phyllodineae in the genus Acacia. An analysis of genomic and chloroplast DNA along with morphological characters found that the section is polyphyletic, though the close relationships of many species were unable to be resolved. Acacia dealbata appears to be most closely related to A. mearnsii, A. nanodealbata and A. baileyana.

Some authorities consider A. dealbata to be a variant of Acacia decurrens.

The specific epithet (dealbata) means 'white-washed' or 'covered in a white powder'.

=== Subspecies ===
In 2001, Phillip G. Kodela and Mary Tindale described two subspecies of A. dealbata in the journal Telopea, and the names are accepted by the Australian Plant Census:

- Acacia dealbata Link subsp. dealbata is a shrub or spreading tree up to 30 m (98 ft) with leaves mostly 50–140 mm (2.0–5.5 in) long, the heads with 22 to 42 pale yellow to yellow, sometimes bright yellow flowers.
- Acacia dealbata subsp. subalpina Tindale & Kodela is a dense shrub or tree up to 3 m (9.8 ft), rarely to 10 m (33 ft), with leaves mostly 15–85 mm (0.59–3.35 in) long, the heads with 13 to 34 bright yellow flowers.

== Distribution and habitat ==
Acacia dealbata is native to New South Wales, Victoria, Tasmania and the Australian Capital Territory, where it grows in forest or woodland in a variety of soils, often on slopes and creek banks. Subspecies subalpina has a narrower distribution from south of the Brindabella Range and Braidwood in New South Wales to the Bonang and Gelantipy areas in north-eastern Victoria.

The species has been widely introduced in Mediterranean, warm temperate, and highland tropical landscapes.

=== As an invasive species ===
In the Western Cape of South Africa, the species is a Category 1 weed, requiring eradication; elsewhere in South Africa it is a Category 2 weed, requiring control outside of plantation areas. In New Zealand, the Department of Conservation classes it as an environmental weed. In Portugal and Spain, the species is listed as an official invasive species (along with other species of acacias). In California, the species is invasive and appears to displace many native species, also threatening the habitat of the endangered Mount Hermon June beetle.

== Use in horticulture ==
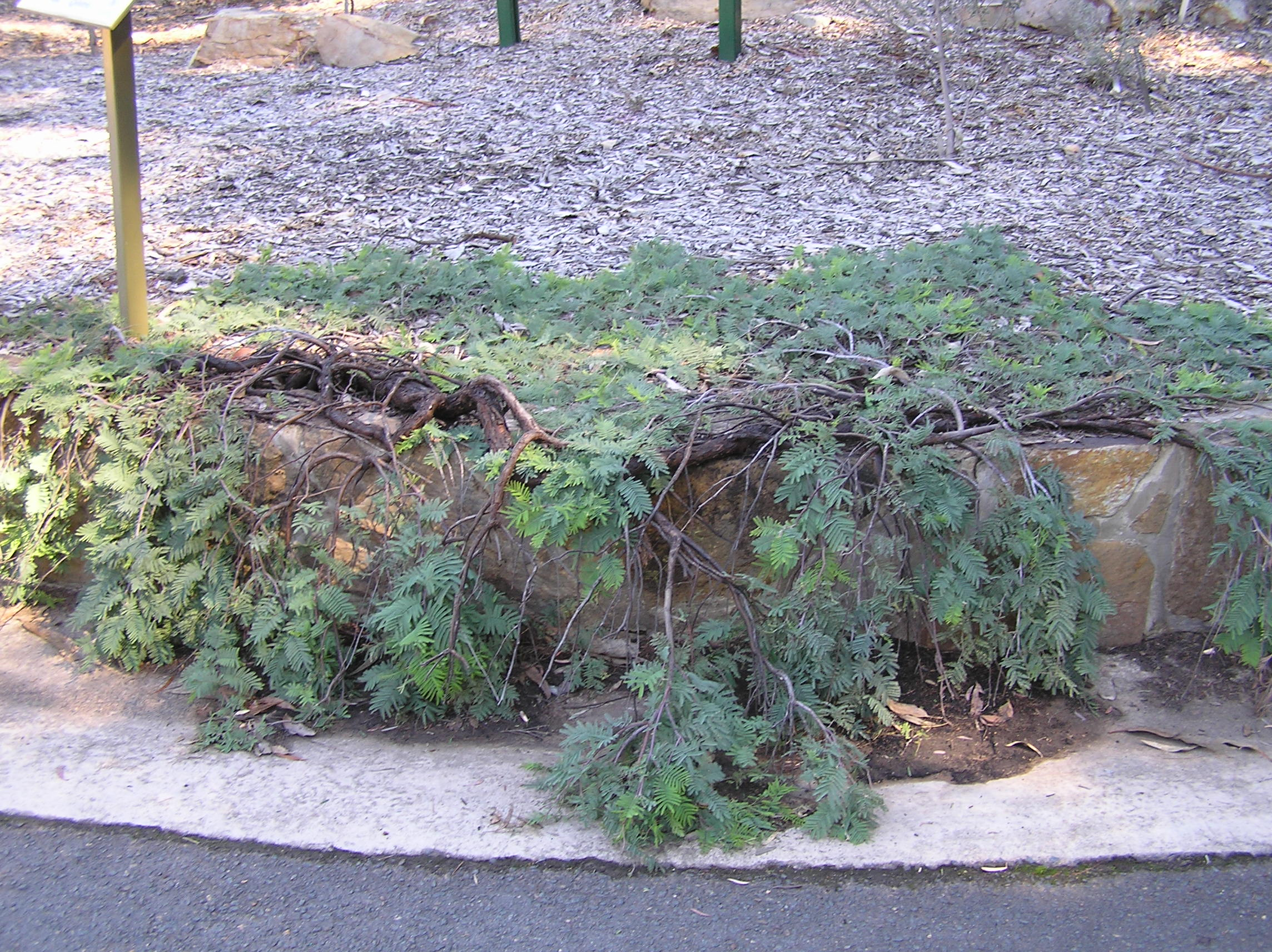
'Kambah Karpet', a cultivar discovered at the Kambah Village

Acacia dealbata is widely cultivated as an ornamental plant in warm temperate regions of the world, and is naturalised in some areas, including Sochi (Black Sea coast of Russia), southwestern Western Australia, southeastern South Australia, Norfolk Island, the Mediterranean region from Portugal to Greece and Morocco to Israel, Yalta (Crimea, Ukraine), California, Madagascar, southern Africa (South Africa, Zimbabwe), the highlands of southern India, south-western China and Chile. It is hardy down to −5 °C (23 °F), but does not survive prolonged frost. It prefers a sheltered position in full sun, with acid or neutral soil. It has gained the Royal Horticultural Society's Award of Garden Merit.

== Uses ==
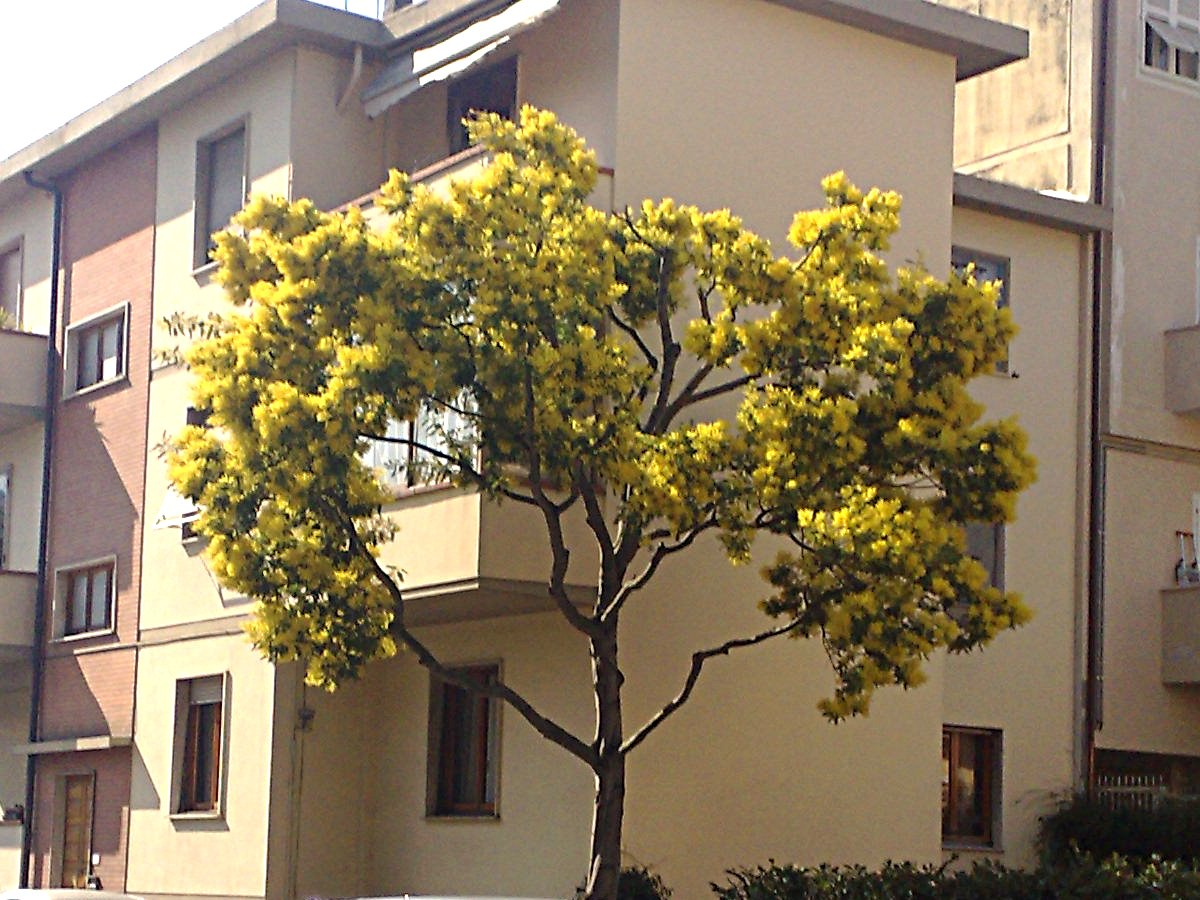
'Mimosa' blossoming in an urban setting in Italy

The flowers and tip shoots are harvested for use as cut flowers, when it is known by the florist trade as "mimosa" (not to be confused with the genus of plants called Mimosa). In Italy, Albania, Russia and Georgia the flowers are also frequently given to women on International Women's Day. The essence of the flowers, called 'mimosa', or in older texts, 'cassie', is used in perfumes. The leaves are sometimes used in Indian chutney.

In Australia, the Ngunnawal people of the ACT and Wiradjuri people of NSW used the bark to make coarse rope and string, the resinous sap for glue or to mix with ash to make poultices, the timber for tools, and the seeds to make flour. The timber is useful for furniture and indoor work, but has limited uses, mainly in craft furniture and turning. It has a honey colour, often with distinctive figures like birdseye and tiger stripes. It has a medium density (540–720 kg/m^{3}), and is similar to its close relative blackwood, but of lighter tone without the dark heartwood.

== In culture ==
Acacia dealbata is one of the most readily-available for use in Wattle Day celebrations or commercial bouquets. It is also one of a few Australian plant species symbolically commemorated in Japan, allegedly being the first plant to bloom in the aftermath of the Hiroshima atomic bomb in August 1945.

== Gallery ==
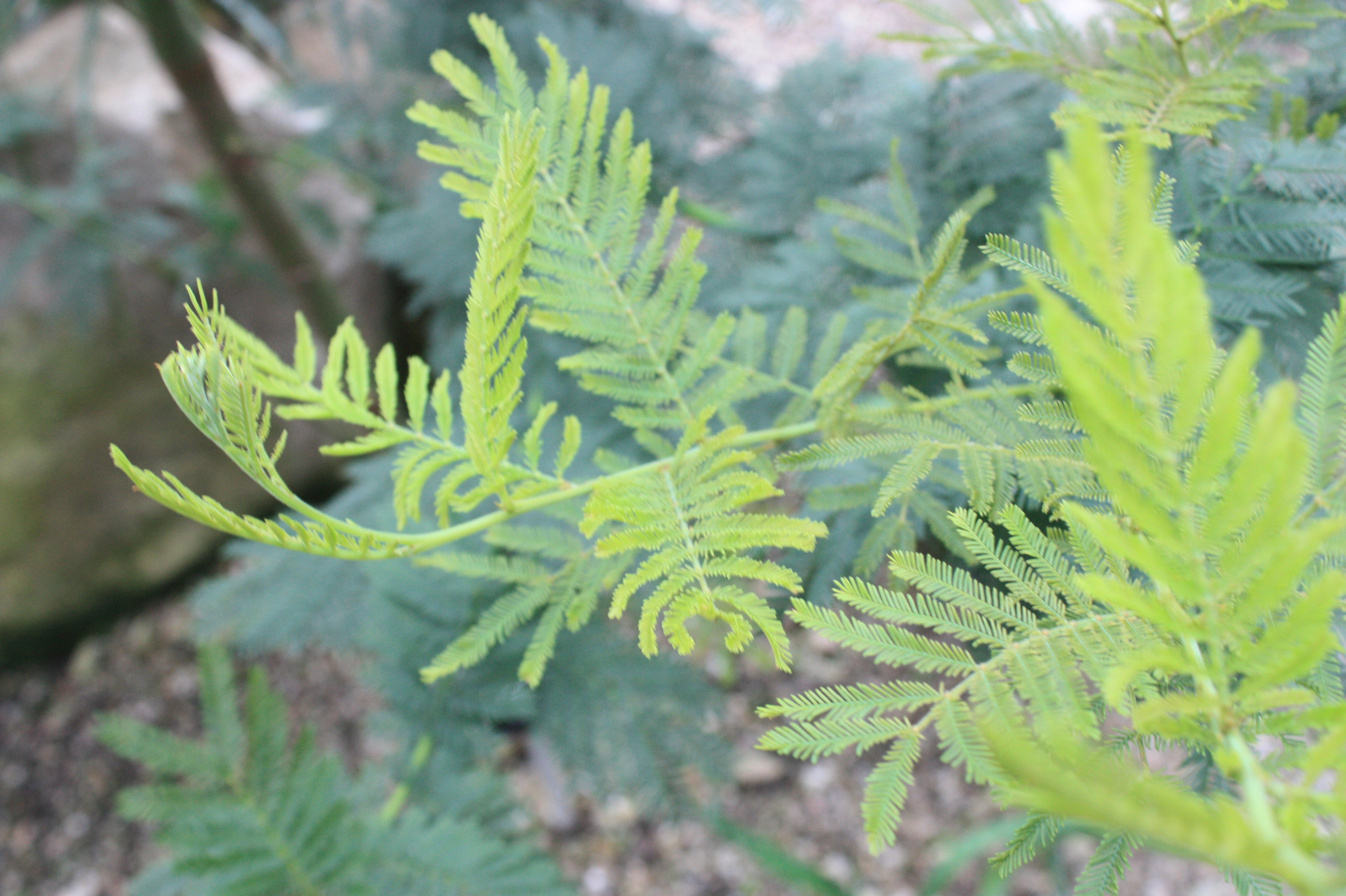
New growth

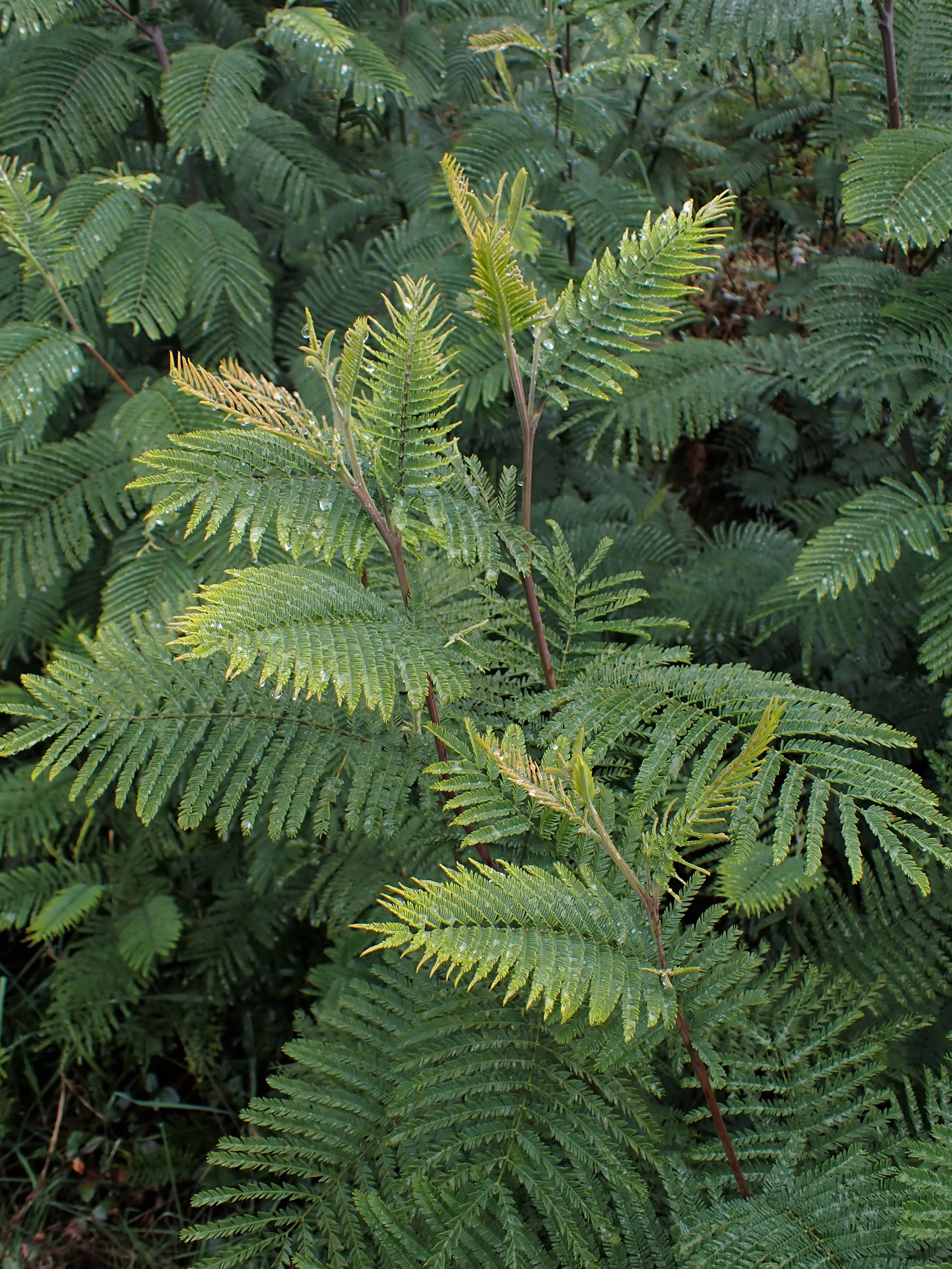
Mature foliage

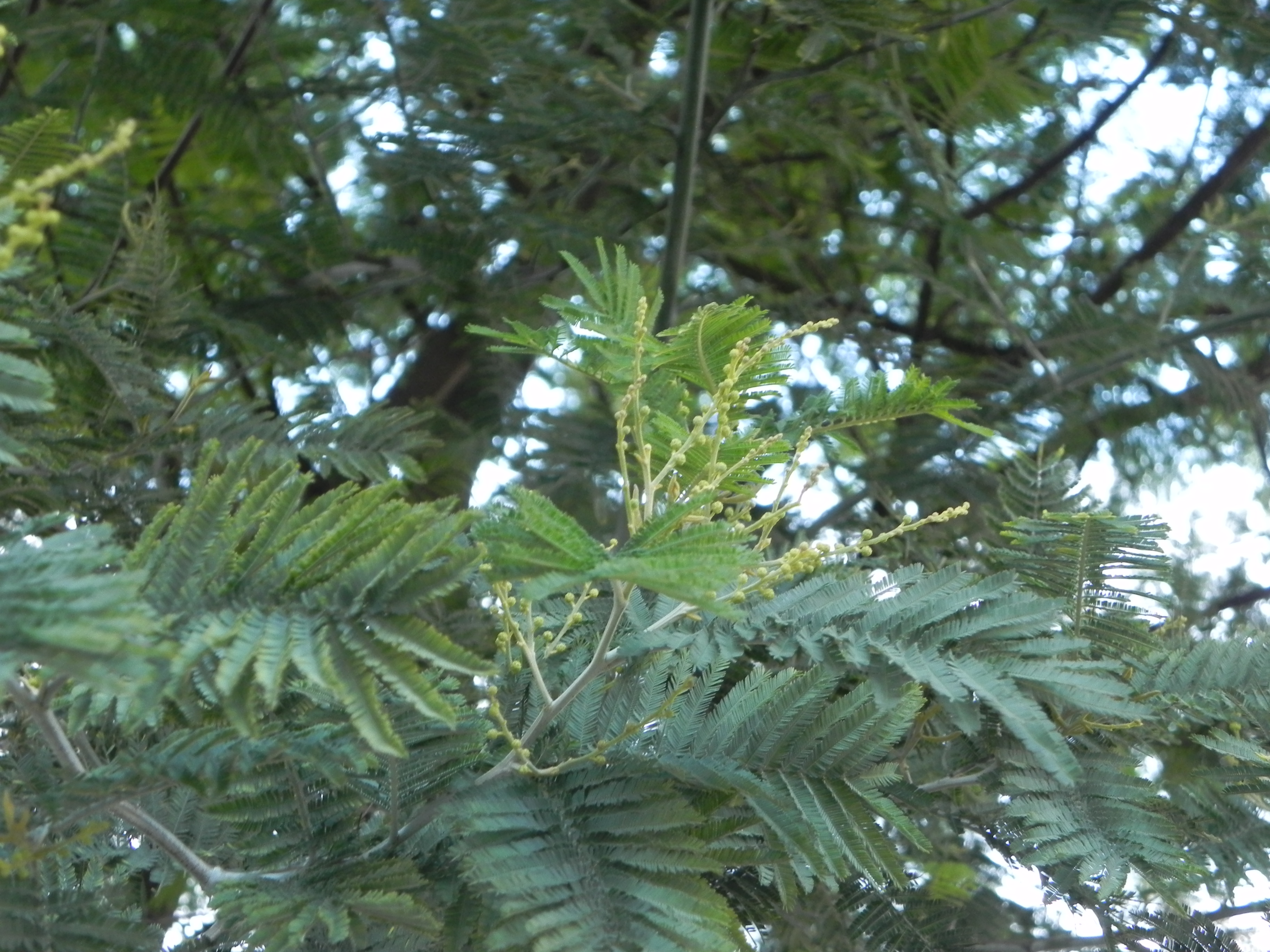
In autumn in the UK with flower buds visible

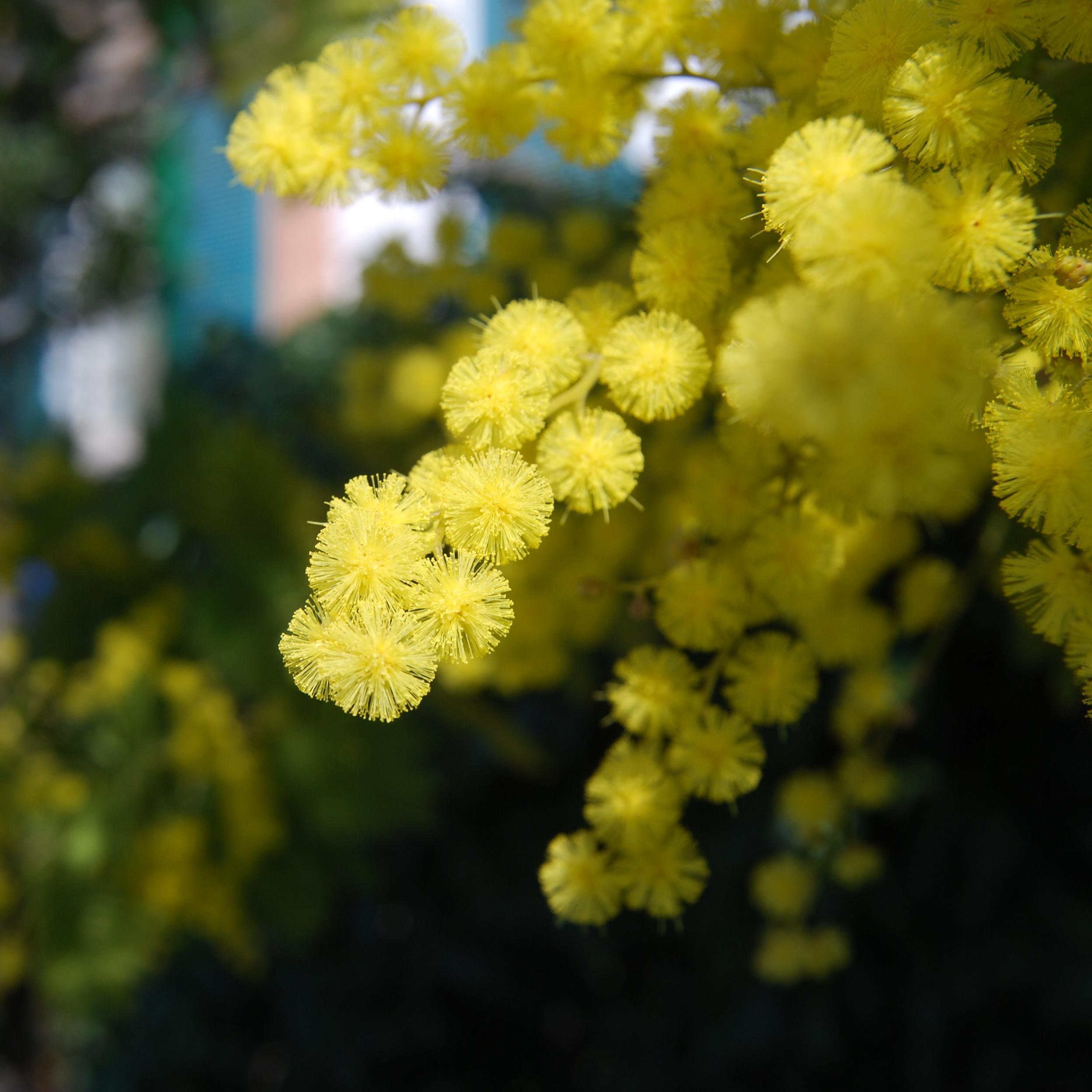
Closeup of flowers

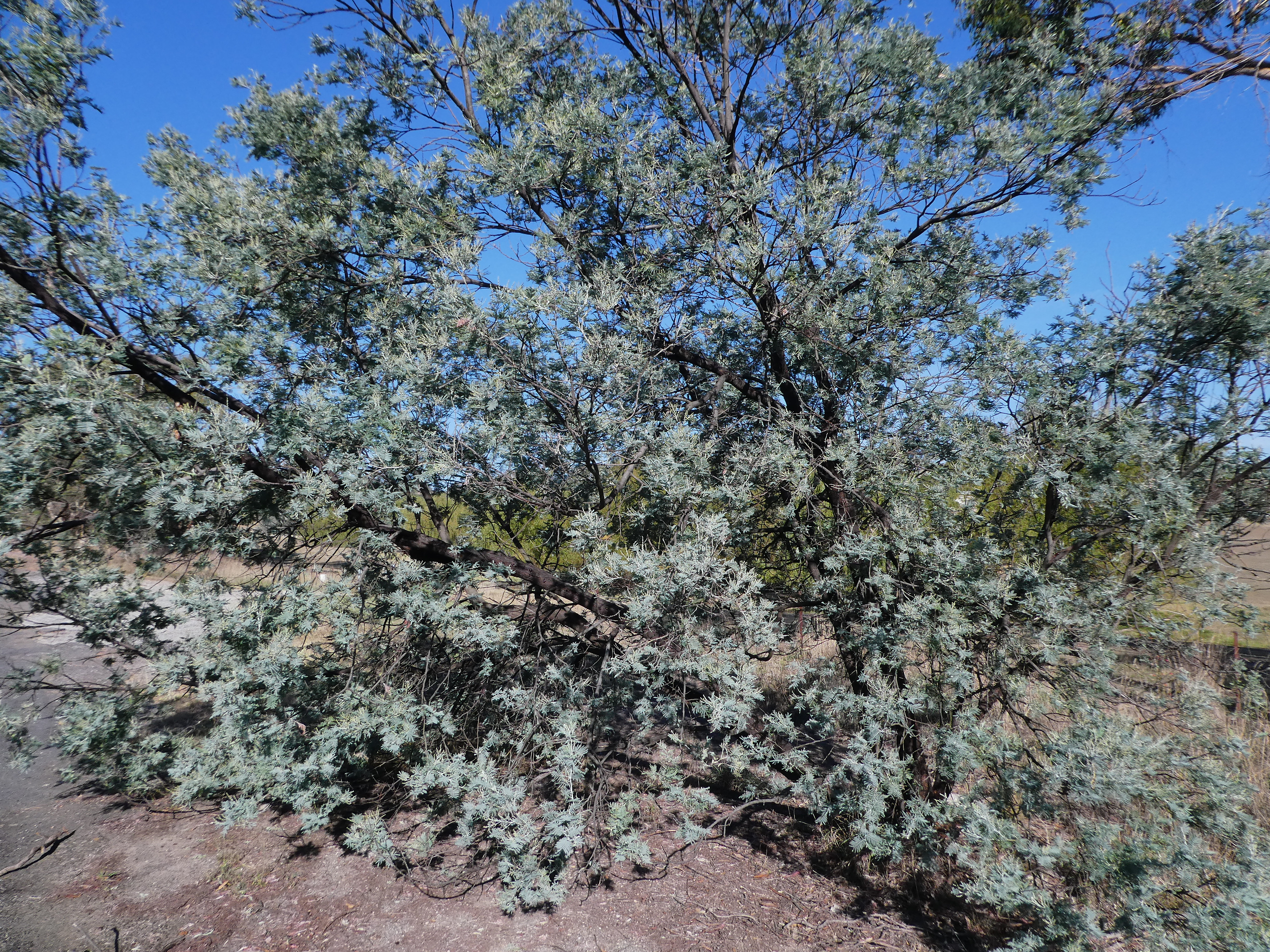
Growing in New South Wales

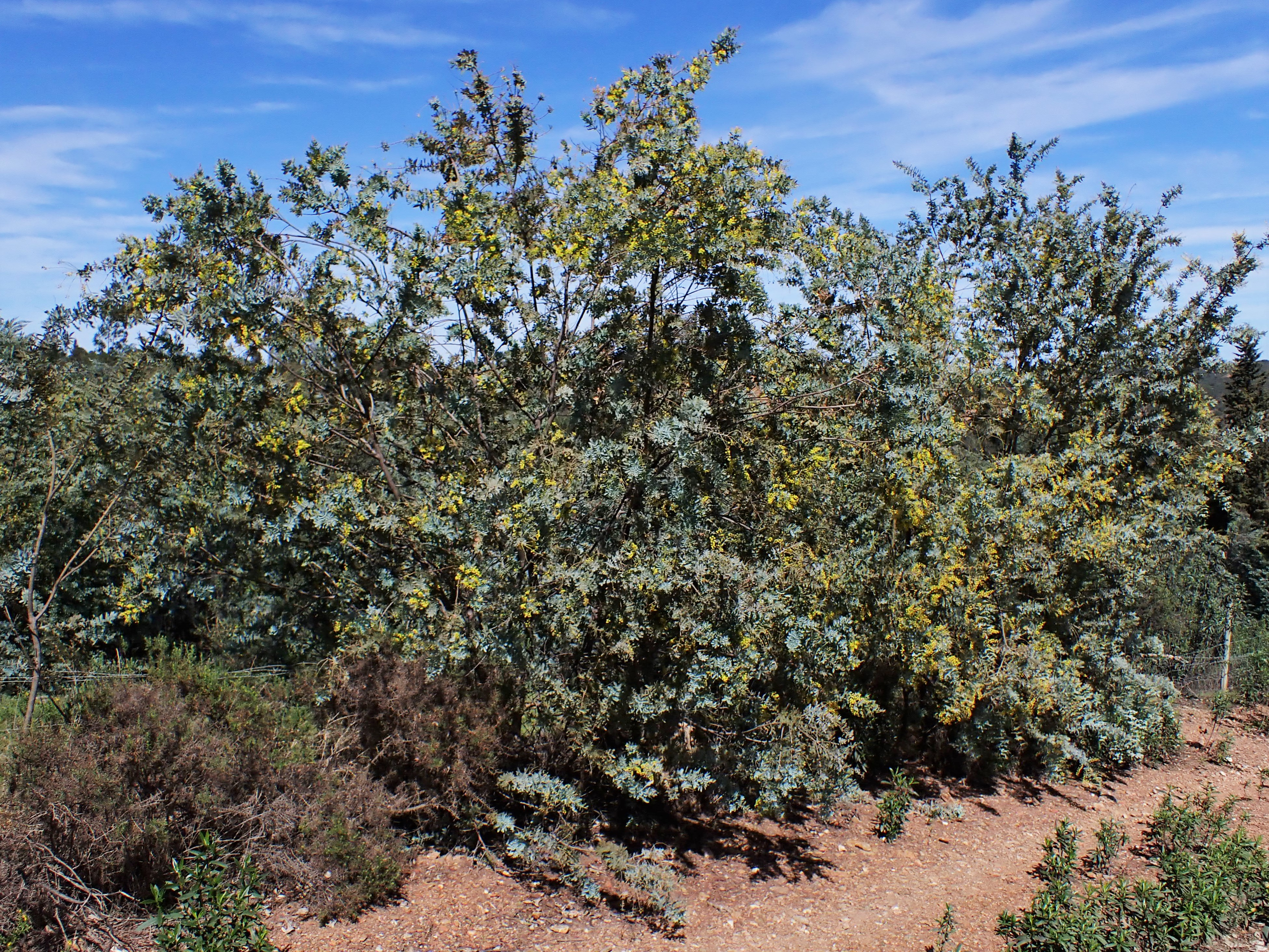
A flowering specimen in Portugal

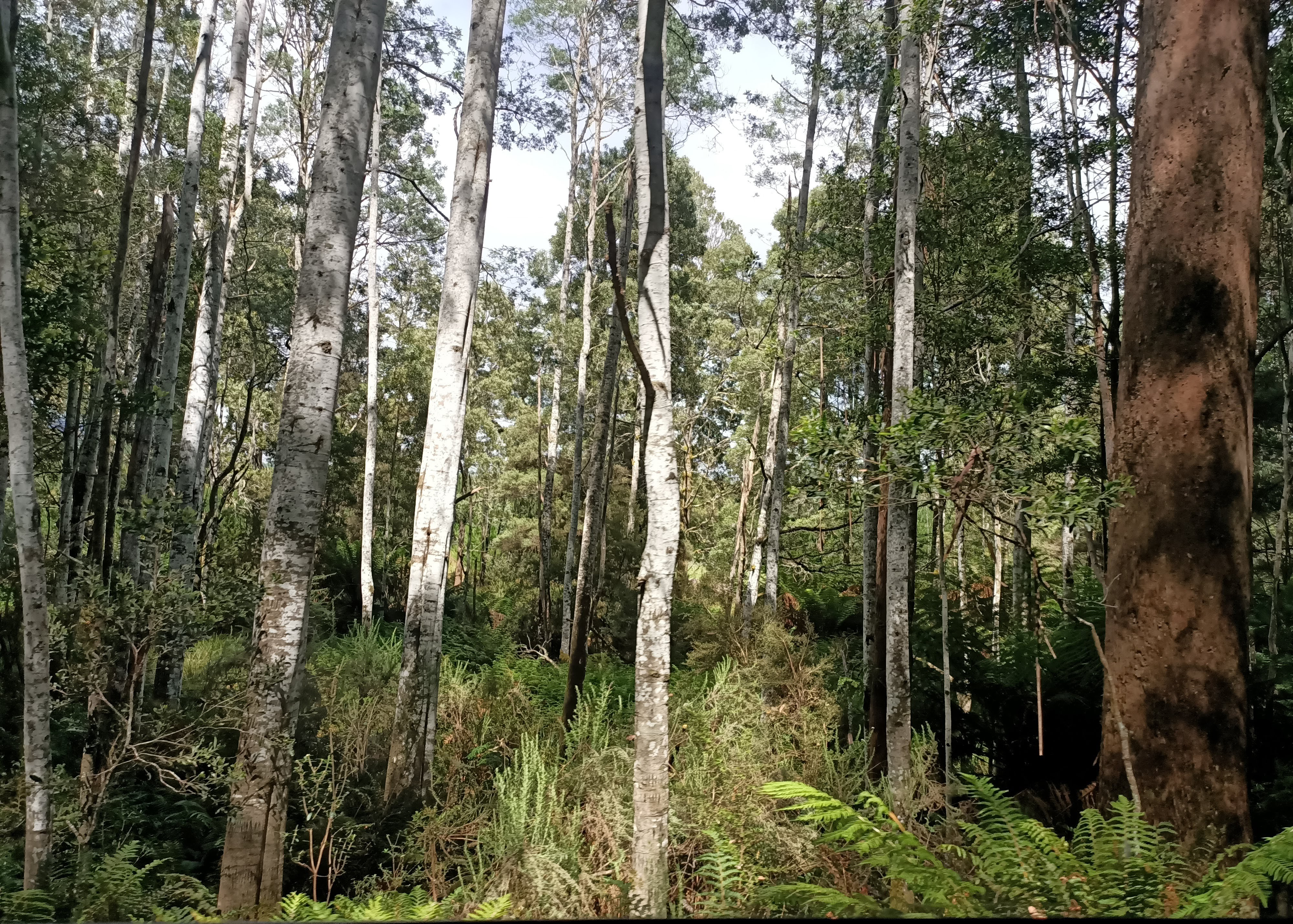
With lichenous trunks in forest near Mount Field National Park

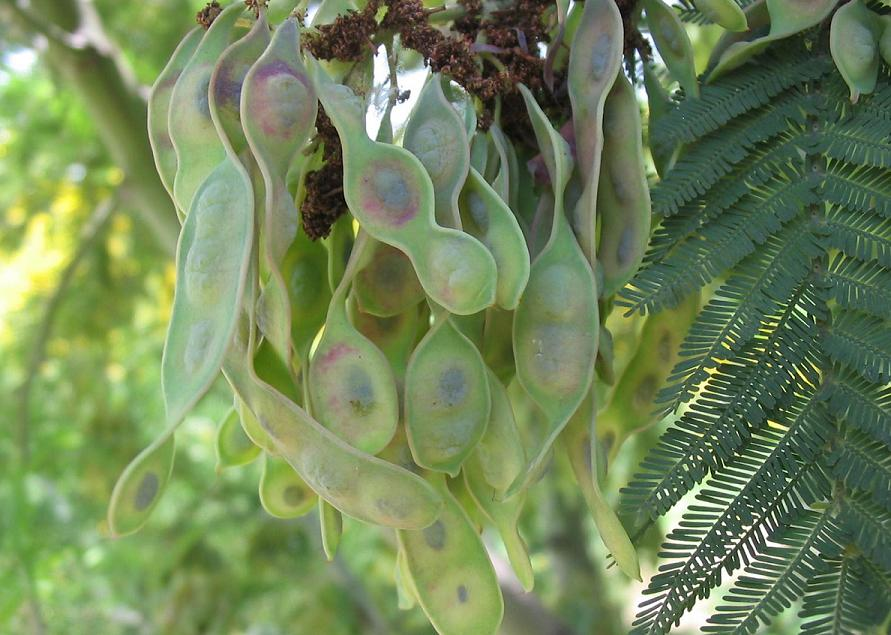
Detail of the fruit

== See also ==
- List of Acacia species
