= Conopomorpha heliopla =

Scientific classification
- Kingdom: Animalia
- Phylum: Arthropoda
- Class: Insecta
- Order: Lepidoptera
- Family: Gracillariidae
- Genus: Conopomorpha
- Species: C. heliopla

Binomial name
- Conopomorpha heliopla Meyrick, 1907

Species of moth

Conopomorpha heliopla is a moth of the family Gracillariidae. It is known from the Australian states of Tasmania, Queensland and Western Australia.

The larvae feed on Acacia species.
