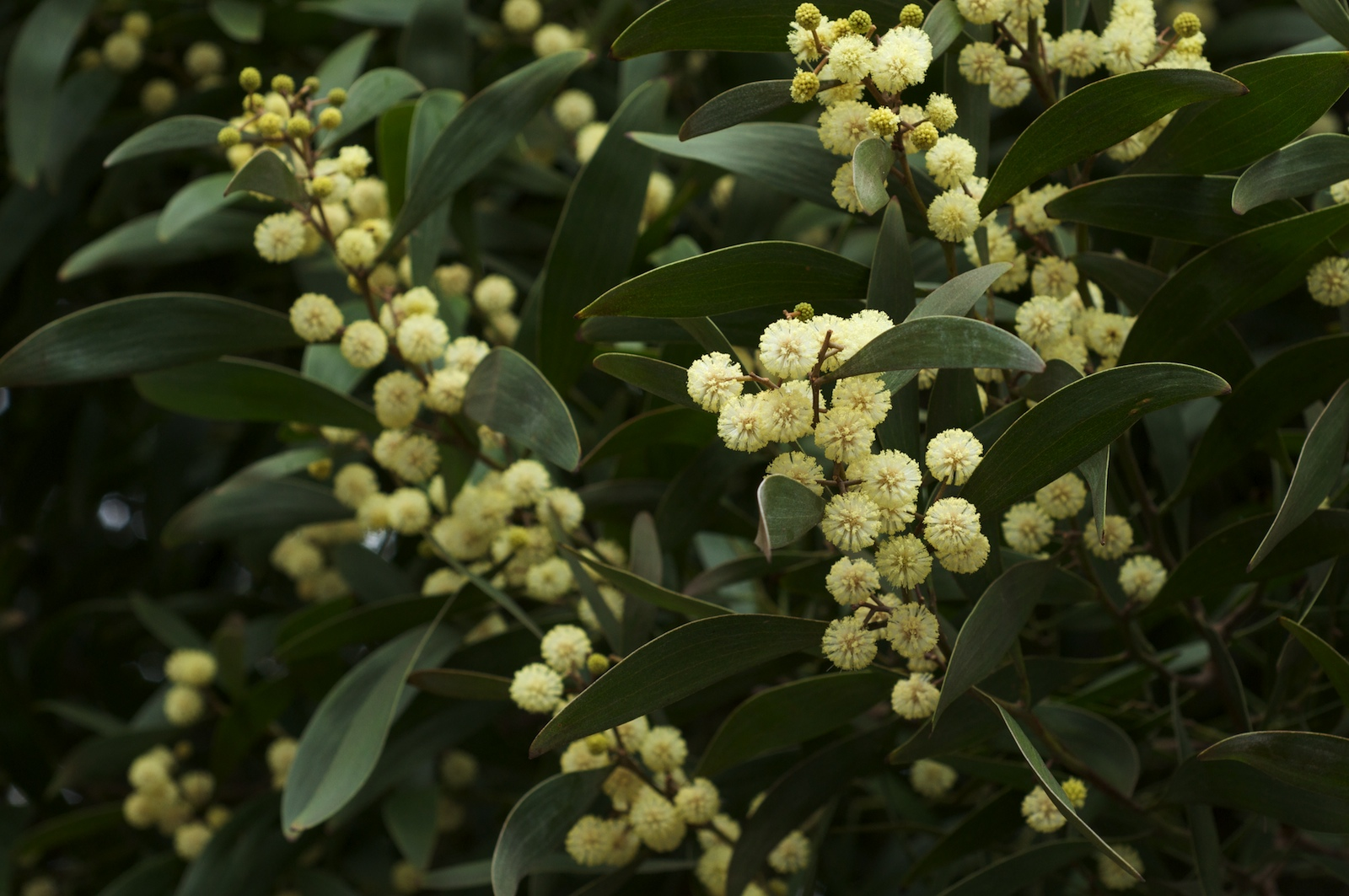
- Flowers and foliage

Scientific classification
- Kingdom: Plantae
- Clade: Tracheophytes
- Clade: Angiosperms
- Clade: Eudicots
- Clade: Rosids
- Order: Fabales
- Family: Fabaceae
- Subfamily: Caesalpinioideae
- Clade: Mimosoid clade
- Genus: Acacia
- Species: A. melanoxylon

Binomial name
- Acacia melanoxylon R.Br.

= Acacia melanoxylon =

Species of legume

Acacia melanoxylon, commonly known as blackwood, Tasmanian blackwood, hickory, sally wattle, black sally or mudgerabah, is a species of flowering plant in the family Fabaceae and is endemic to south-eastern Australia. It is a tree, sometimes a shrub, with hard, fissured and somewhat scaly bark, ribbed, usually glabrous branchlets, narrowly elliptic or lance-shaped phyllodes, spherical heads of creamy pale yellow to white flowers, and strongly curved to openly coiled pods.

== Description ==
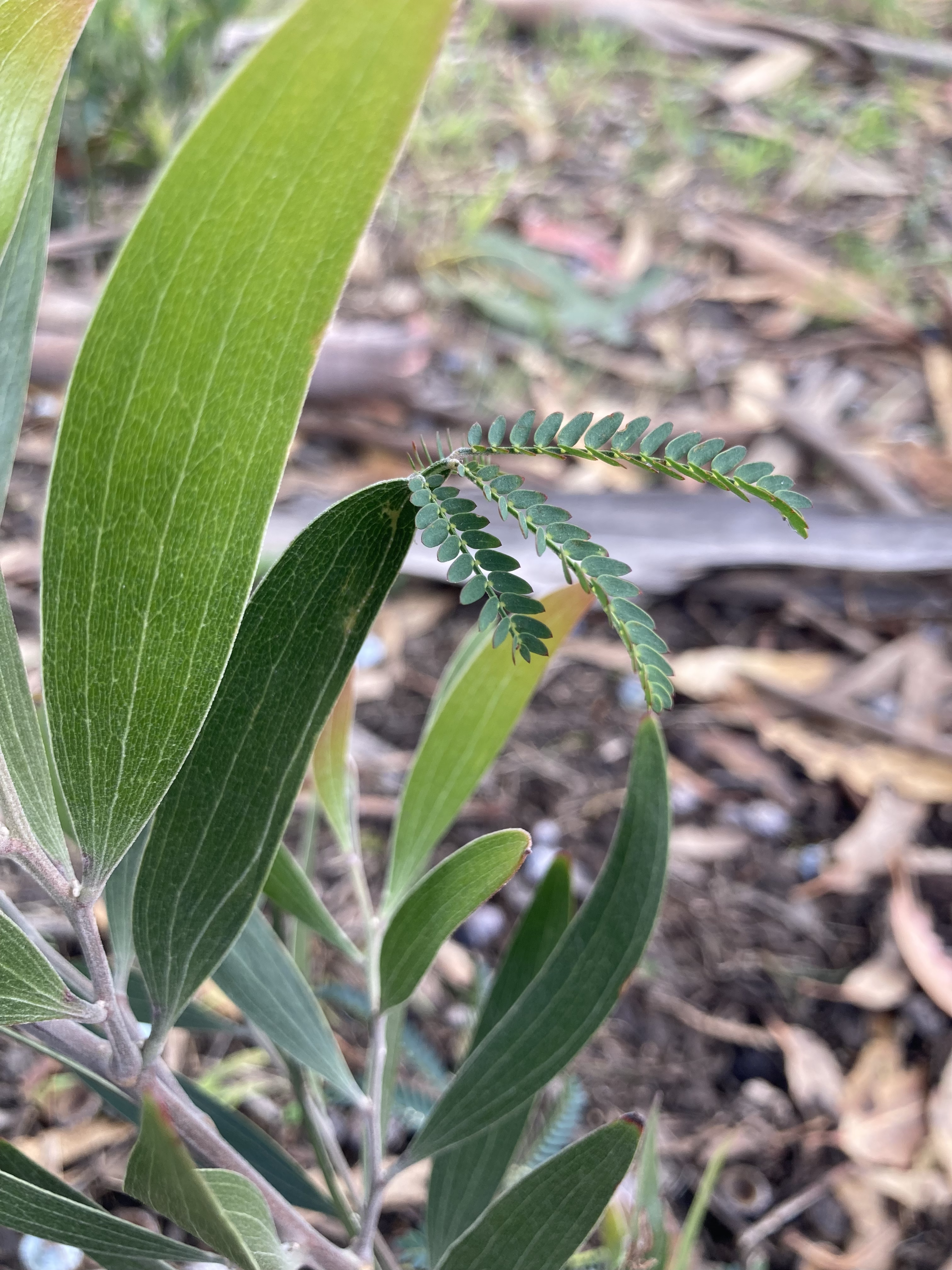
Phyllode and leaf on a young specimen.

Acacia melanoxylon is a tree that typically grows to a height of 6–30 m (20–98 ft), sometimes a shrub to 1.5–3 m (4 ft 11 in – 9 ft 10 in), and is sometimes spread by root suckers. It has hard, fissured and somewhat scaly, dark grey to black bark and ribbed, glabrous branchlets. Its phyllodes are narrowly elliptic or lance-shaped, sometimes with the narrower end towards the base, straight to more or less sickle-shaped, 40–160 mm (1.6–6.3 in) long, 6–30 mm (0.24–1.18 in) wide, dark green, glabrous and more or less leathery with three to five main veins. The flowers are borne in three to five spherical heads in racemes 6–40 mm (0.24–1.57 in) long on peduncles 4–13 mm (0.16–0.51 in) long. The heads are about 6 mm (0.24 in) in diameter with 30 to 56 creamy pale yellow to white flowers. Flowering occurs from July to December and the pods are strongly curved to openly coiled and often twisted, up to 150 mm (5.9 in) long, 3.5–8 mm (0.14–0.31 in) wide, glabrous and leathery to subwoody. The seeds are broadly elliptic, 3–5 mm (0.12–0.20 in) long, and glossy black.

== Taxonomy ==
Acacia melanoxylon was first formally described in 1813 by Robert Brown in William Aiton's Hortus Kewensis. The specific epithet (melanoxylon) means 'black or dark wood or timber', referring to the dark brown to almost black streaks in the timber of this wattle.

== Distribution and habitat ==
Blackwood is widespread and often common, found from the Atherton Tableland and south through the highlands of Queensland, New South Wales, the Australian Capital Territory, Victoria and Tasmania. It is also found in the Mount Lofty and Flinders Ranges in South Australia and is sometimes naturalised in Western Australia. It grows in a variety of habitats, favouring fertile valley soils and flats in mountainous areas, often and forest and cooler rainforest, sometimes in drier eucalypt forest and woodland. In Tasmania, it is often the dominant tree in forested seasonal swamps.

== Timber ==
A. melanoxylon is valued for its decorative timber which may be used in cabinets, musical instruments and in boatbuilding.

=== Appearance ===
Sapwood may range in colour from straw to grey-white with clear demarcation from the heartwood. The heartwood is golden to dark brown with chocolate growth rings. The timber is generally straight grained but may be wavy or interlocked. Quartersawn surfaces may produce an attractive fiddleback figure. The wood is lustrous and possesses a fine to medium texture.

The name of the wood may refer to dark stains on the hands of woodworkers, caused by the high levels of tannin in the timber.

=== Properties ===
A. melanoxylon timber - commonly known as "blackwood" - has a density of approximately 660 kg/m^{3} and is strong in compression, resistant to impact and is moderately stiff. It is moderately blunting to work with tools and bends well. It may be nailed or screwed with ease, but gluing may produce variable results. The wood is easily stained and produces a high-quality finish.

Australian blackwood seasons easily with some possible cupping when boards are inadequately restrained. The timber produces little movement once seasoned.

The timber is susceptible to attacks by furniture beetles, termites and powder-post beetles (sapwood) due to its physical resistance to effective preservative treatments.

The timber provides very high chatoyance, with an average value above 26 PZC.

== Invasive species ==
The species has been introduced to many countries for forestry plantings and as an ornamental tree. It now is present in Africa, Asia, Europe, Indian Ocean, the Pacific Ocean, South America and the United States. It is a declared noxious weed species in South Africa and is a pest in Portugal's Azores Islands. It was also recently listed by the California Invasive Plant Council (Cal-IPC) as an invasive weed that may cause limited impact (Knapp 2003). Its use as a street tree is being phased out in some locales because of the damage it often causes to pavements and underground plumbing. In some regions of Tasmania, blackwood is now considered a pest.

== Uses ==
Indigenous Australians use many parts of A. melanoxylon for a variety of purposes. Seeds are harvested and consumed as a common bush tucker food, and leaves can be used as a soap or fishing poison. The bark is either harvested to make string or prepared as a traditional analgesic, while wood is often used to make clap sticks, spear-throwers and shields.

The live plant is also employed as a fire barrier in rural settings when grown amongst other fire-resistant species.

Blackwood timber is commercially milled for wood paneling, furniture, joinery and cabinetry, tool handles, boat-building, inlaid boxes and wooden kegs. It is often qualitatively compared to walnut hardwood, and its physical properties are well-suited for shaping with steam. The bark contains a tannin content of about 20%, and is often engineered to produce decorative wood veneer. Plain and figured Australian blackwood is used for musical instruments; in particular, guitars, drums, Hawaiian ukuleles, violin bows and organ pipes. More recently, blackwood has seen an increasing value as a substitute for koa wood.

== Gallery ==
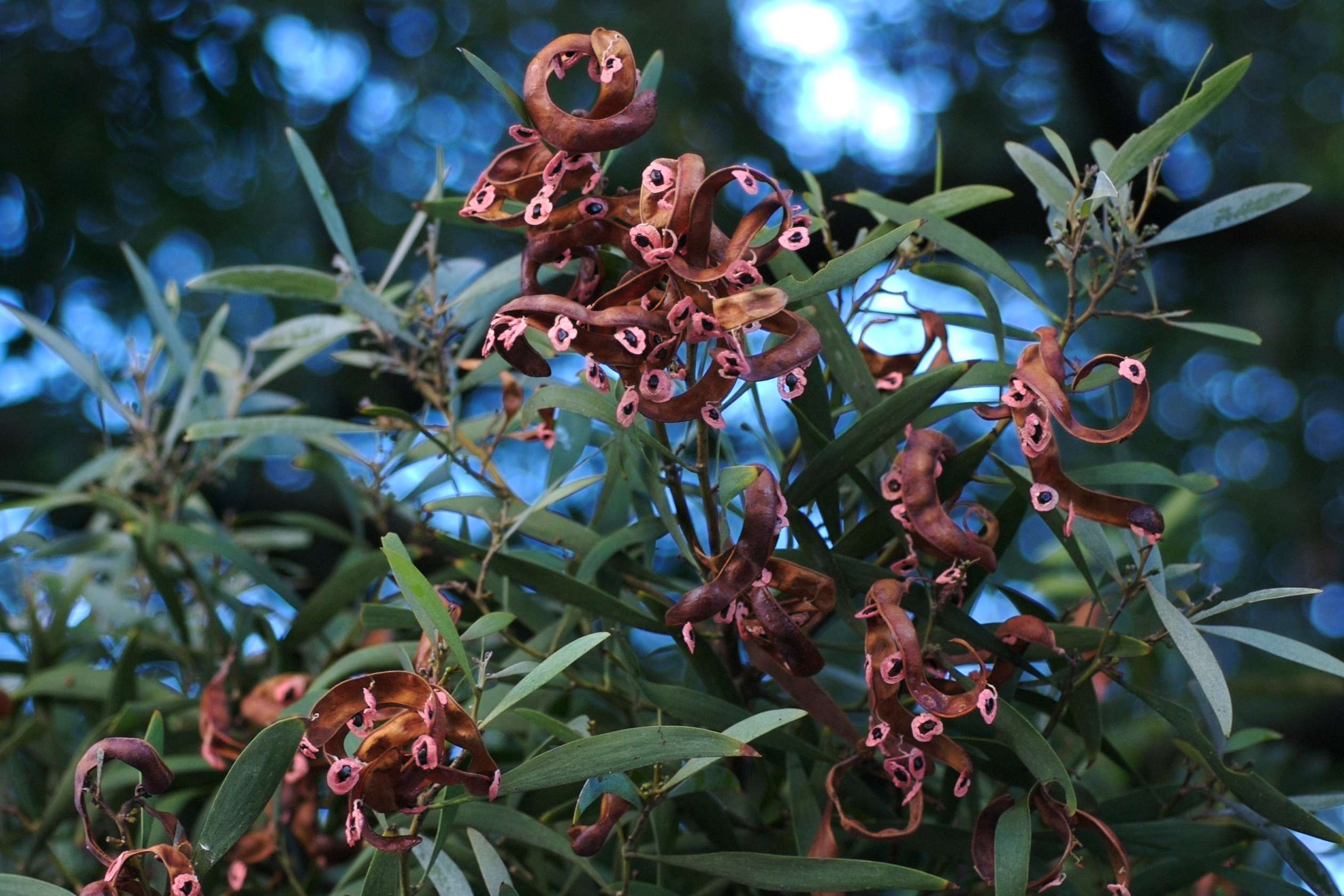
Acacia melanoxylon foliage and seeds with elaiosomes

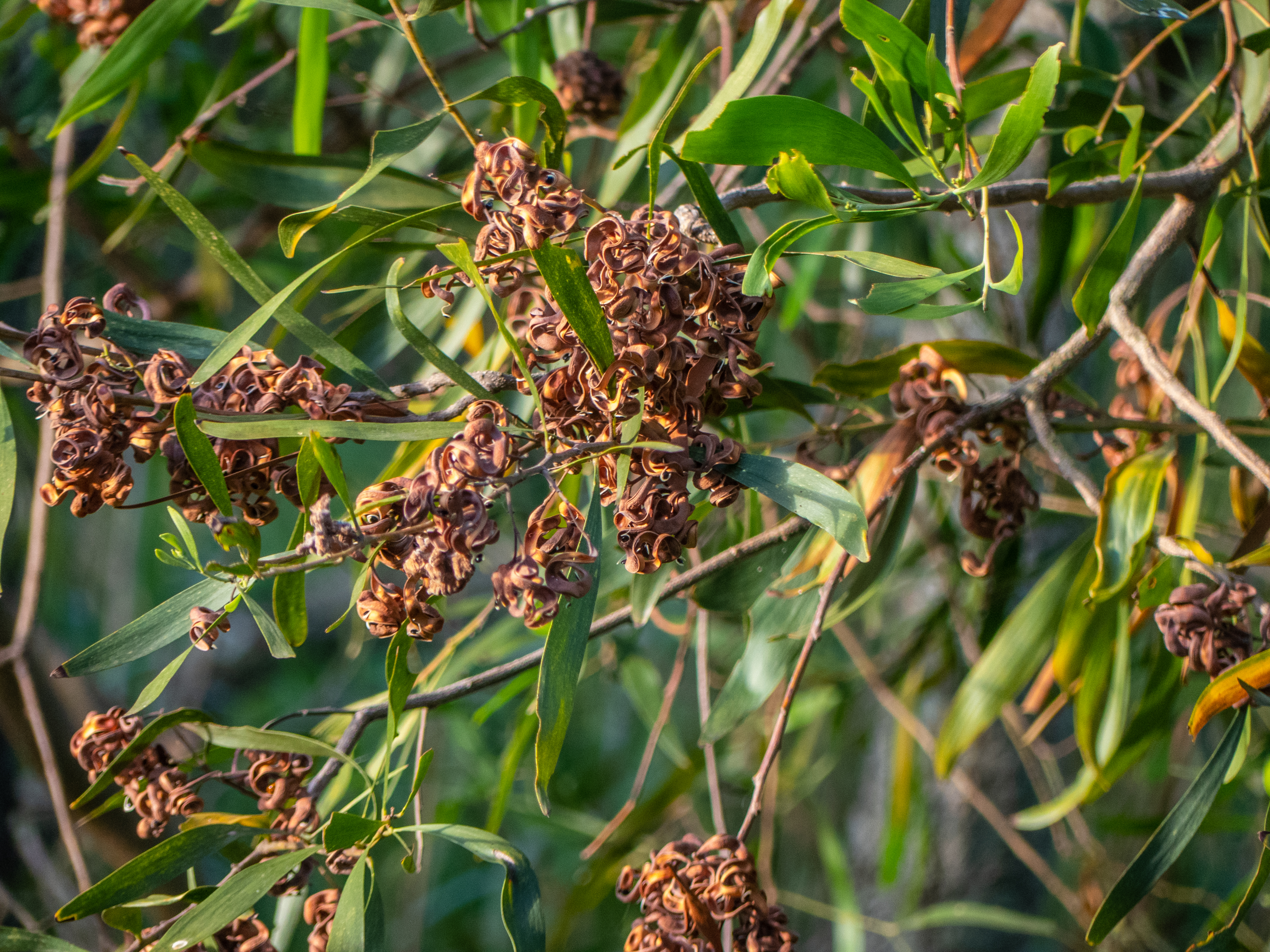
Seed pods

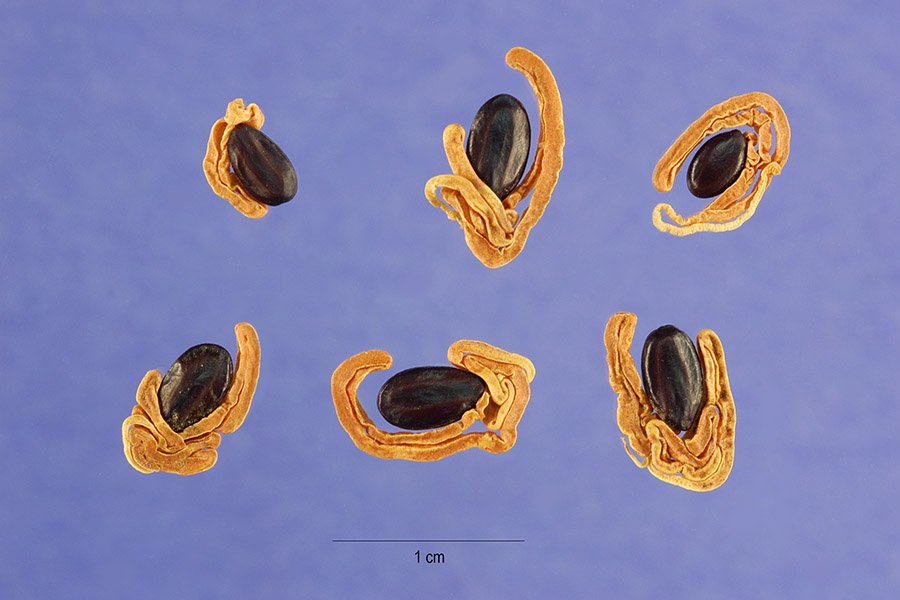
Seeds

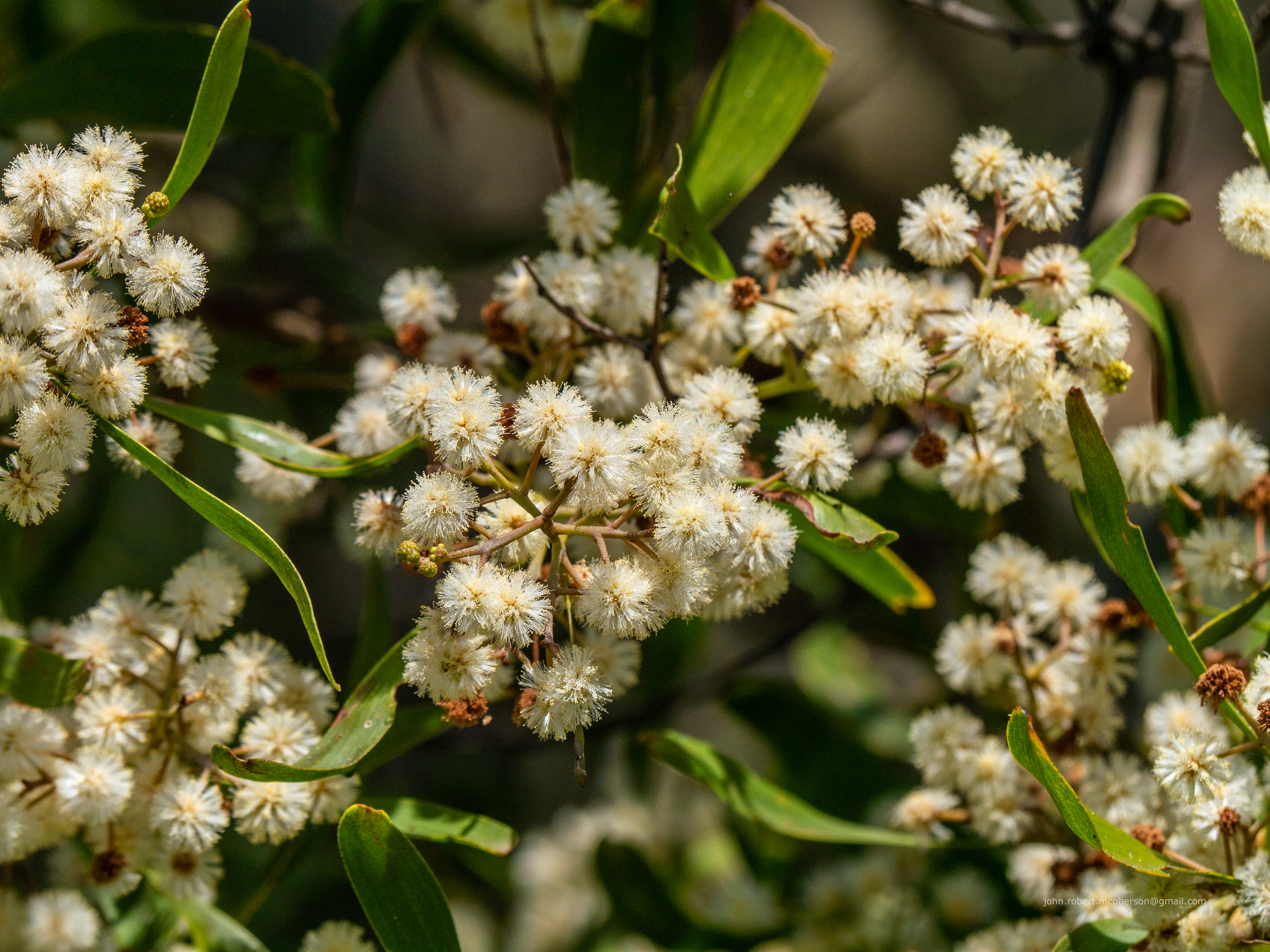
Inflorescences

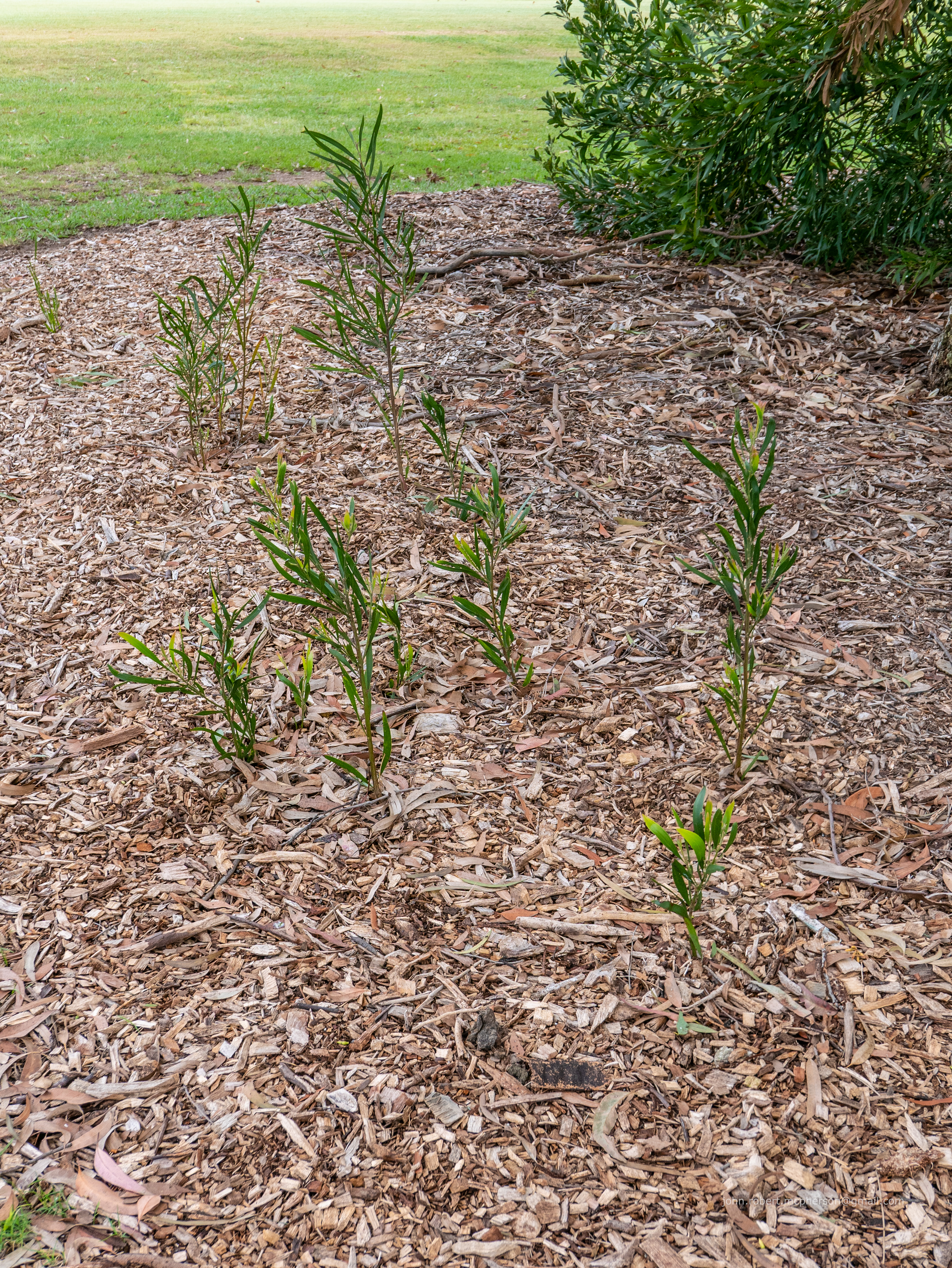
Saplings

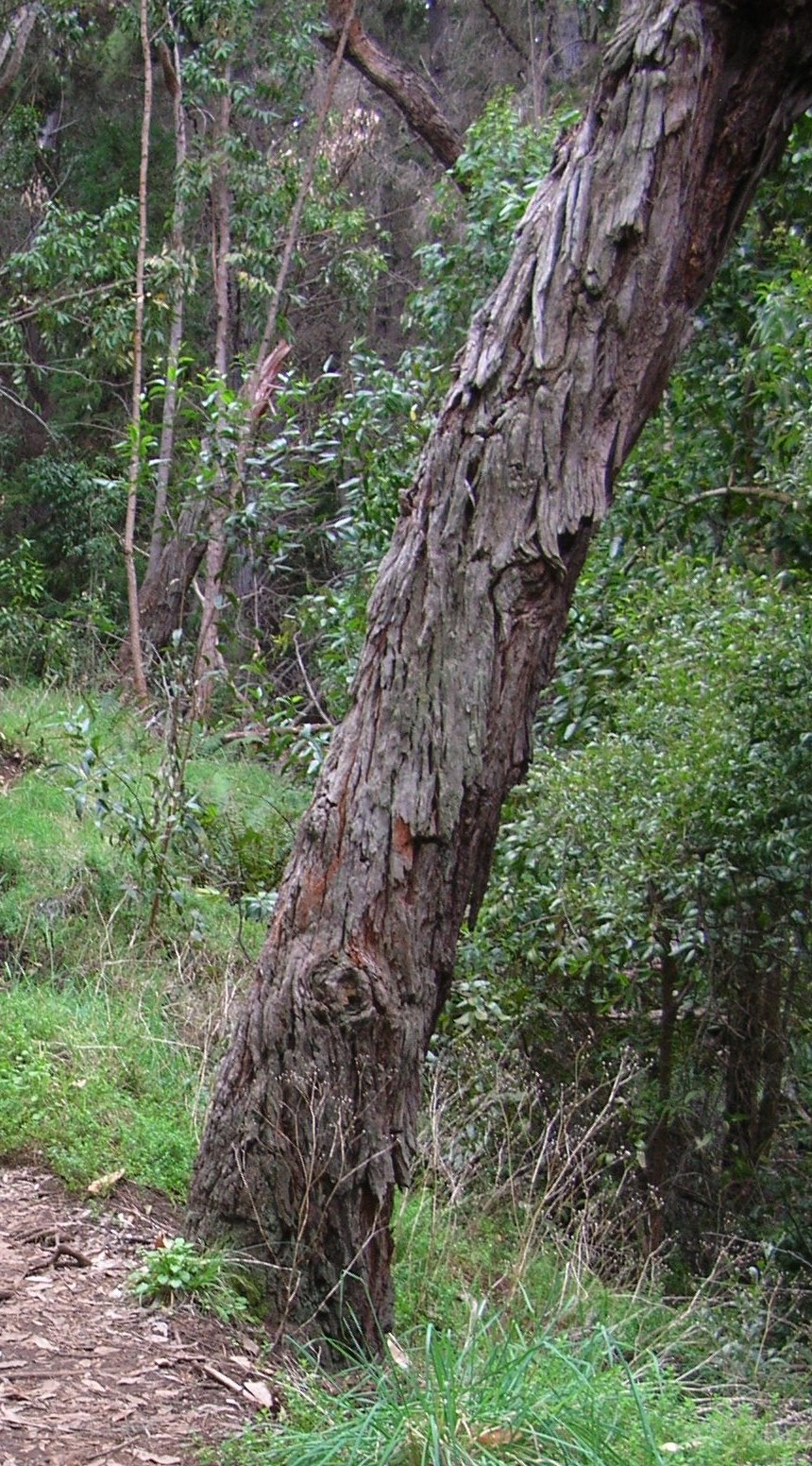
A. melanoxylon older bark

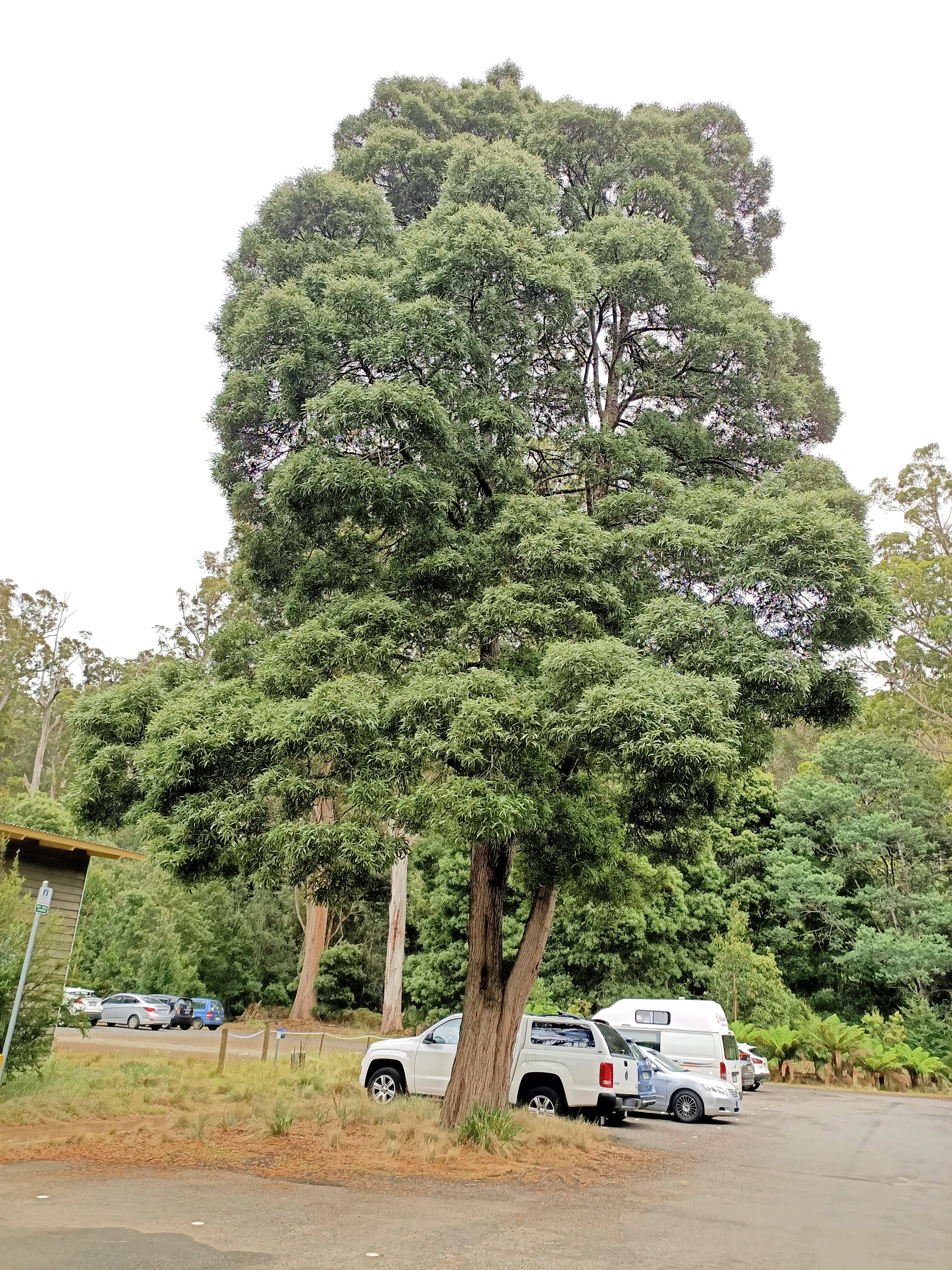
Tree outside Mount Field National Park

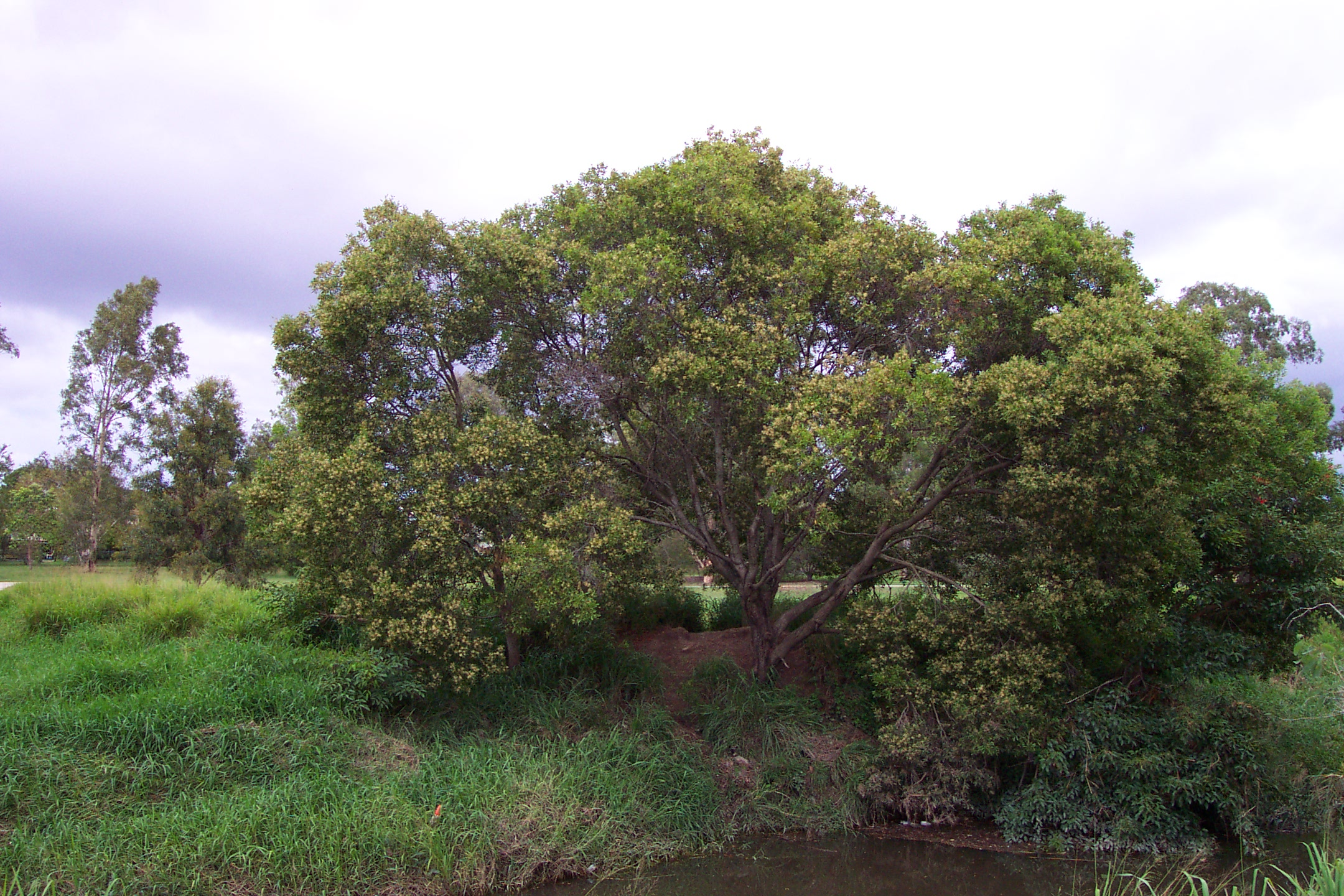
In 7th Brigade Park, Chermside, Queensland.

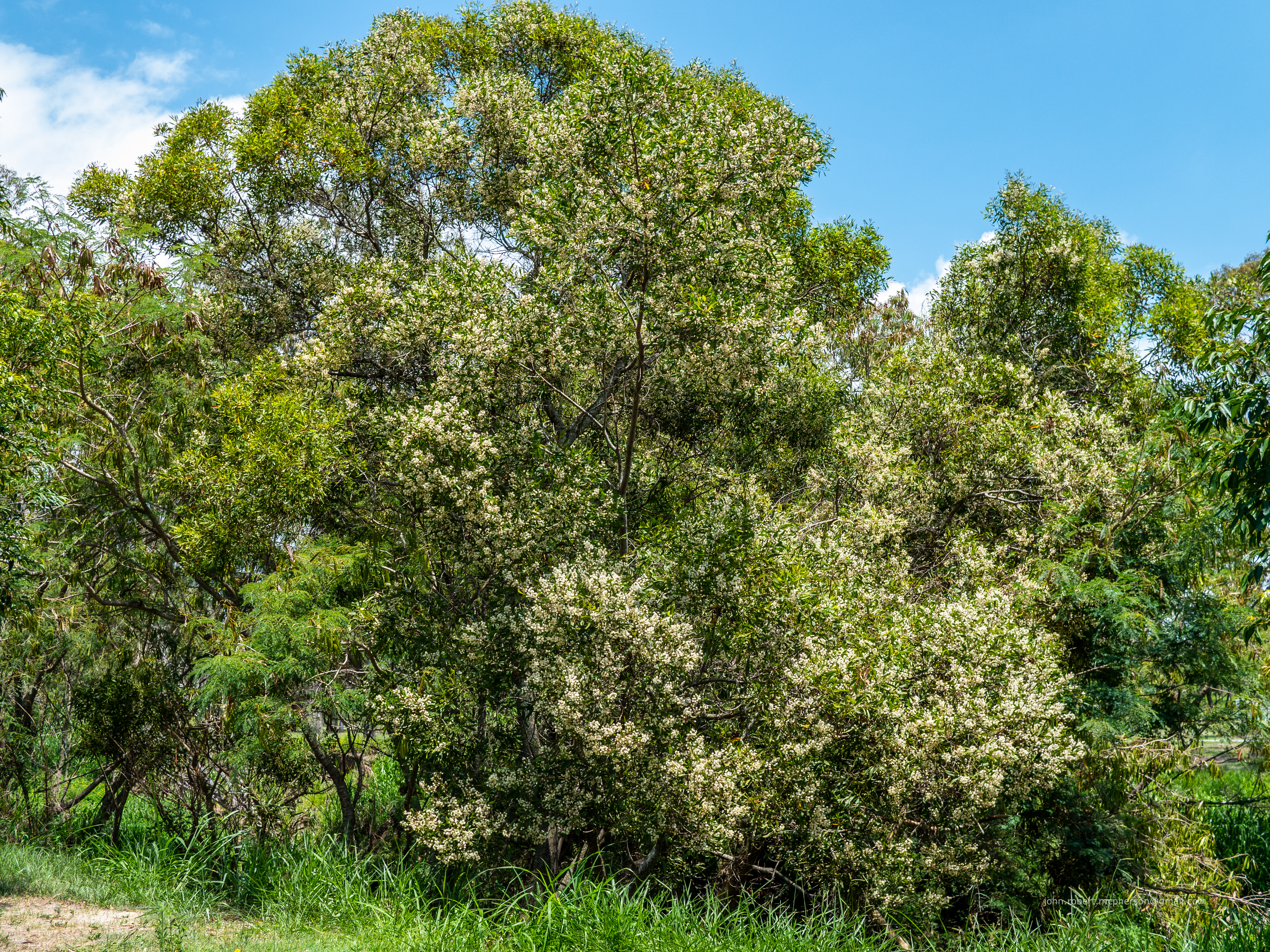
Habit

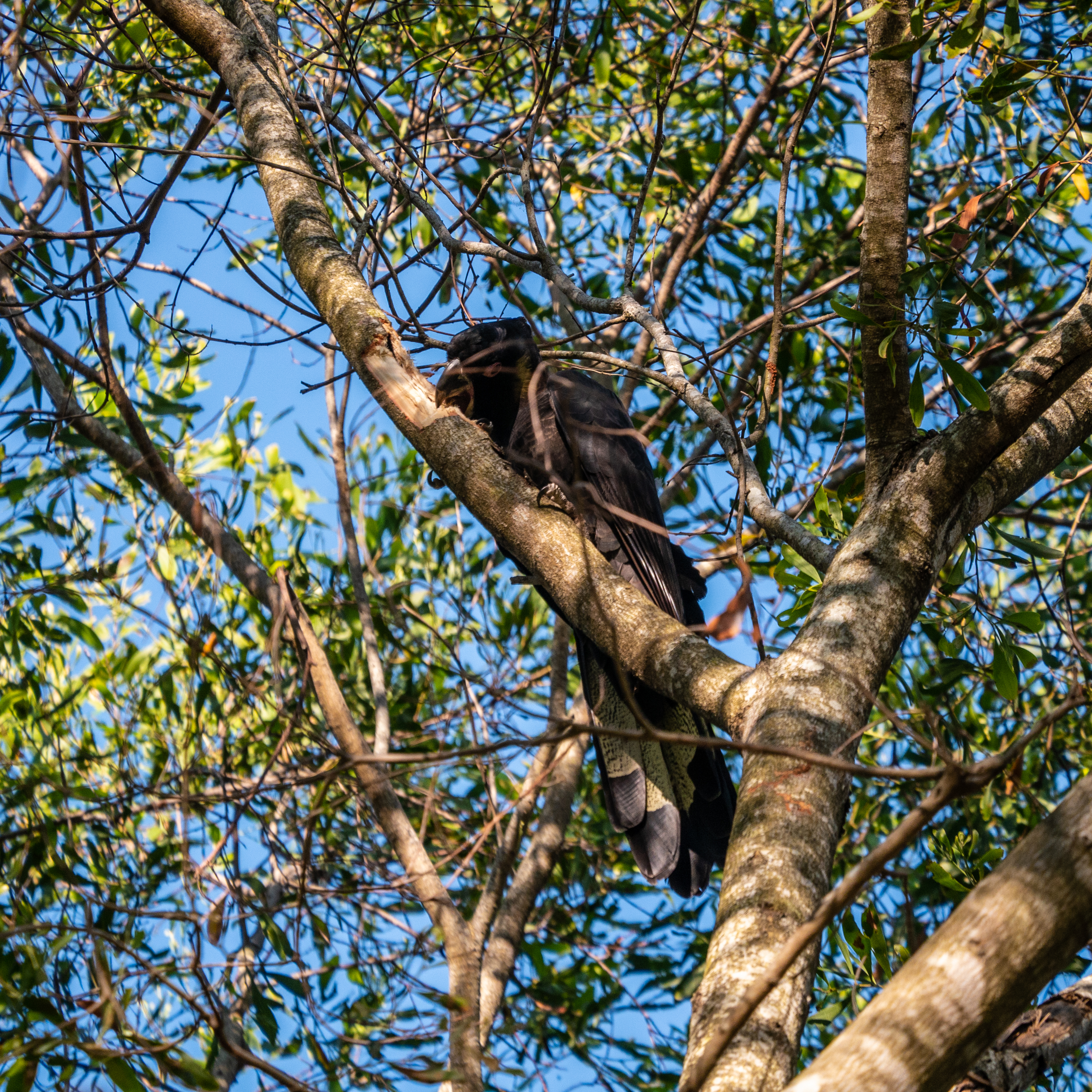
Yellow-tailed black-cockatoo searching for insect larvae in branches
