= Streptomyces yogyakartensis =

Scientific classification
- Domain: Bacteria
- Kingdom: Bacillati
- Phylum: Actinomycetota
- Class: Actinomycetes
- Order: Streptomycetales
- Family: Streptomycetaceae
- Genus: Streptomyces
- Species: S. yogyakartensis

Binomial name
- Streptomyces yogyakartensis Sembiring et al. 2001

Type strain
- C4R3, C4R3 (S3), DSM 41766, JCM 11448, MTCC 6924, NBRC 100779, NCIMB 13681, NRRL B-24280

Species of bacterium

Streptomyces yogyakartensis is a bacterium species from the genus of Streptomyces which has been isolated from rhizosphere soil from the tree Paraserianthes falcataria in Yogyakarta on Java on Indonesia.

== See also ==
- List of Streptomyces species
