= Erygia precedens =

Scientific classification
- Kingdom: Animalia
- Phylum: Arthropoda
- Class: Insecta
- Order: Lepidoptera
- Superfamily: Noctuoidea
- Family: Erebidae
- Genus: Erygia
- Species: E. precedens

Binomial name
- Erygia precedens (Walker, [1858])

Synonyms
- Briarda precedens Walker, [1858]; Felinia precedens; Ansa filipalpis Walker, 1858; Erygansa kebea Bethune-Baker, 1906; Crioa hypsichaetes Turner, 1929

Species of moth

Erygia precedens is a moth of the family Erebidae. It is found from the Indo-Australian tropics to Australia, Fiji and Samoa.

Adults are similar to Erygia antecedens.

The larvae have been recorded feeding on Calliandra species.
