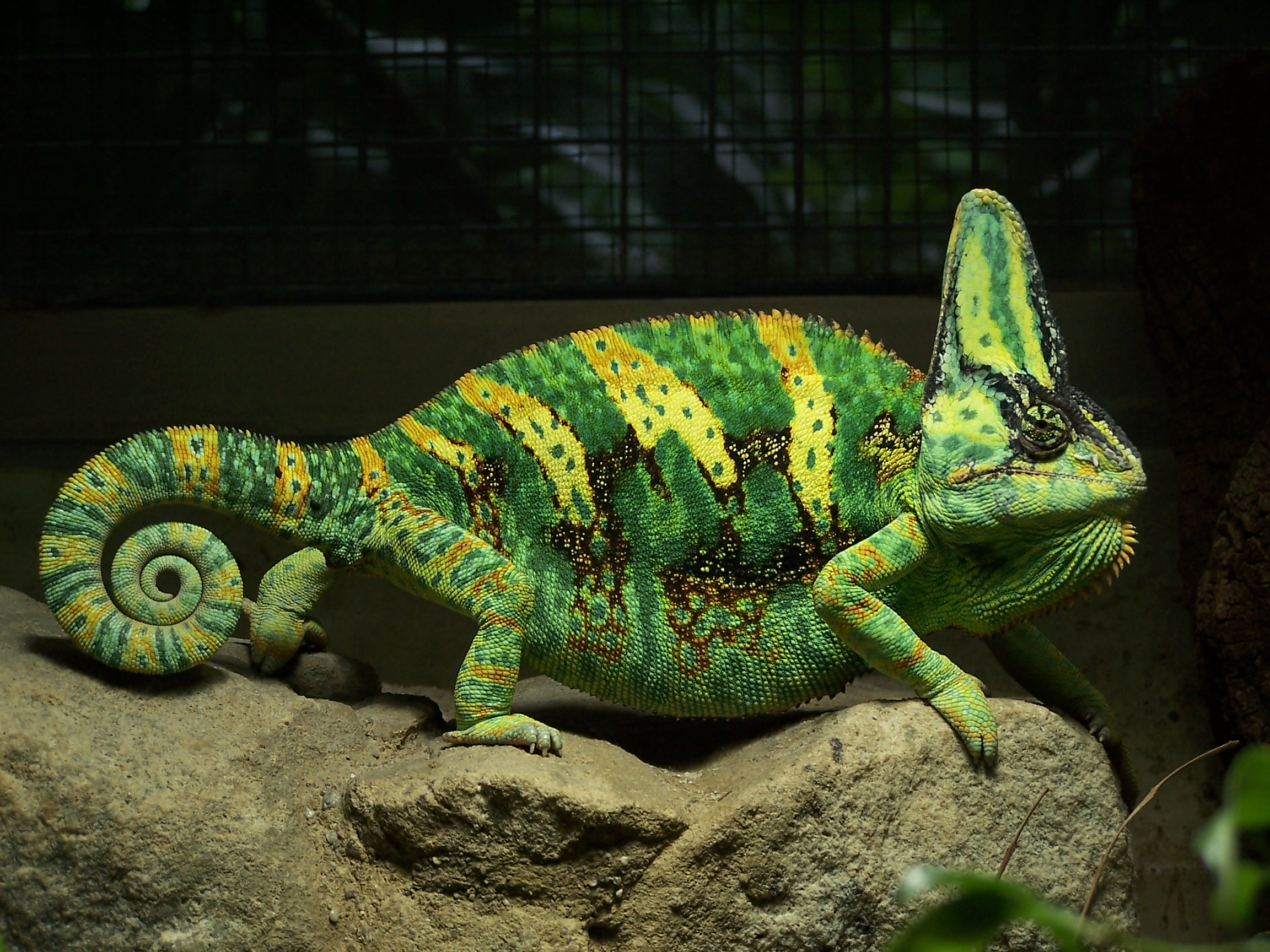

Conservation status
- Least Concern (IUCN 3.1)

Scientific classification
- Kingdom: Animalia
- Phylum: Chordata
- Class: Reptilia
- Order: Squamata
- Suborder: Iguania
- Family: Chamaeleonidae
- Genus: Chamaeleo
- Species: C. calyptratus

Binomial name
- Chamaeleo calyptratus Duméril & Bibron, 1851
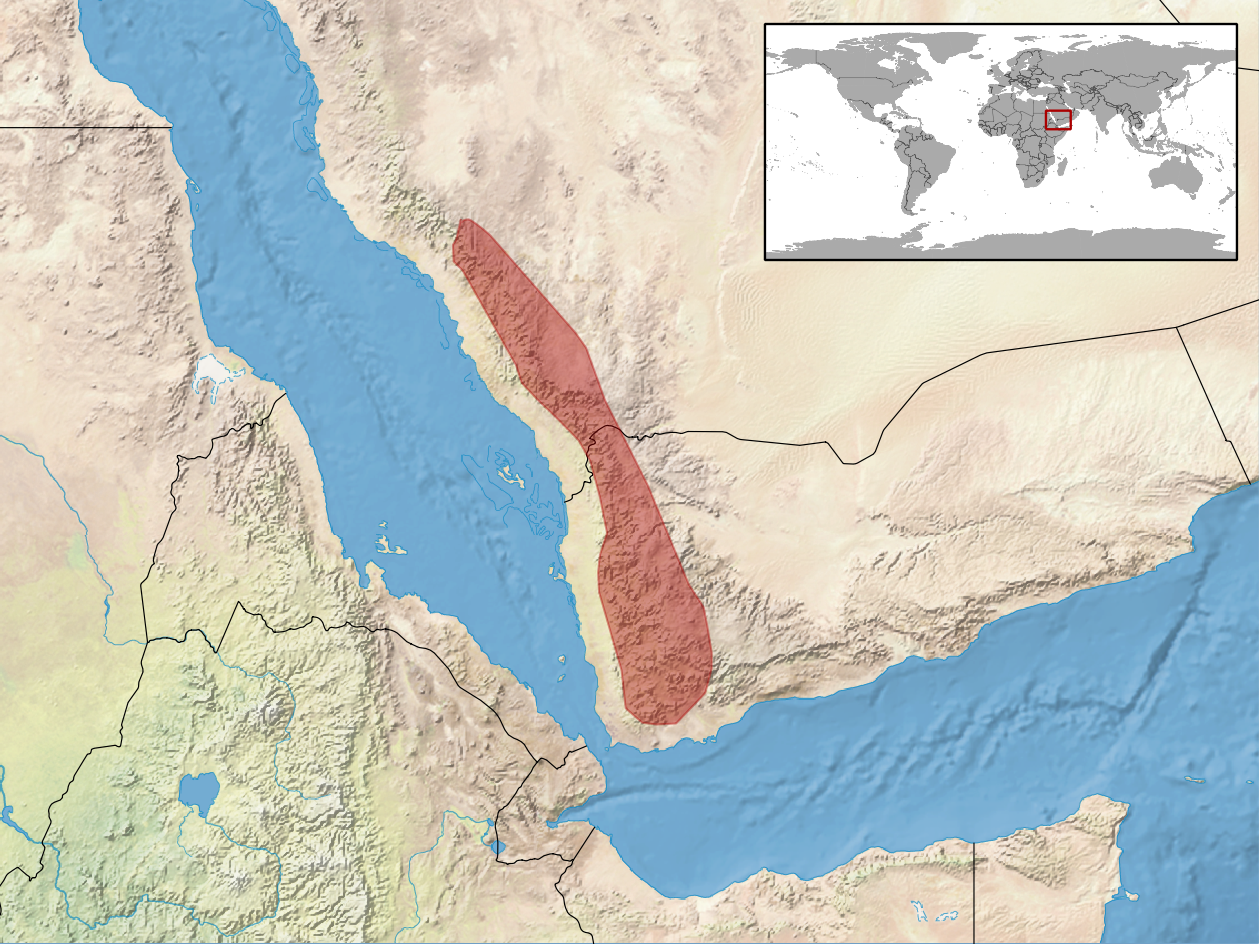

= Veiled chameleon =

Species of reptile

The veiled chameleon (Chamaeleo calyptratus) is a species of chameleon (family Chamaeleonidae) native to the Arabian Peninsula in Yemen and Saudi Arabia. Other common names include cone-head chameleon, Yemen chameleon, and Yemeni chameleon. They are born pastel green and without their distinctive casques on their head. When newly hatched veiled chameleons are surprised, they may drop to the ground and turn a bright red color due to stress.

As they mature, their casque develops along with more vibrant coloring, as well as a dramatic gular fold that will protrude from their throat and chin. They are known for their variable color changes due to a variety of factors, including to show aggression, social status, reproduction, and stress. Female lifespan is around five years while male lifespan is around eight, and they breed a few times a year.

== Etymology ==
The term 'veiled chameleon' refers to the species Chamaeleo calyptratus. 'Veiled' describes their distinctive casque on the head, resembling a veil. This term highlights the species' unique feature. The generic term 'chameleon' is derived from the Greek 'χαμαιλέων' ('khamailéōn'), a compound of 'χαμαί' ('khamaí'), meaning 'low to the ground' and 'λέων' ('léōn'), meaning 'lion', emphasizing the specie's nature as akin to a miniature lion, highlighting its dignified and perhaps majestic demeanor, much like a lion in miniature form, staying close to the ground. The species name 'calyptratus' comes from the Greek 'καλύπτρα' (kalýptra), meaning 'veil' or 'cover', referring to the distinctive casque or veil-like structure on their head. This casque not only serves as a significant physical characteristic but also plays a practical role in channeling dew and rainwater towards the mouth for hydration.

== Description ==
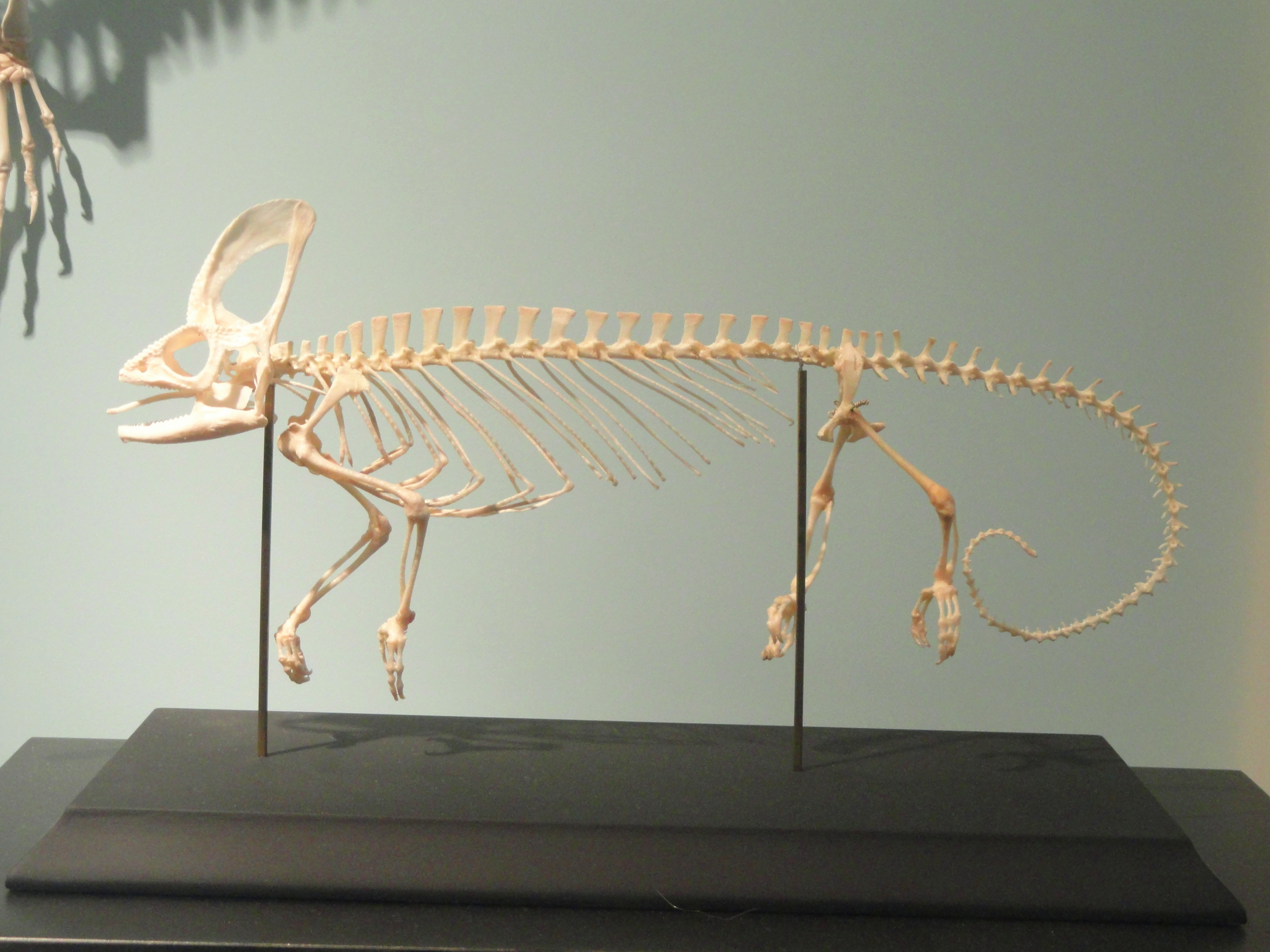
Skeleton

The male is 43 to 61 cm (17 to 24 in) long from the snout to the tip of the tail. The female is shorter, no more than about 35 cm (14 in), but it has a thicker body. Both sexes have a casque on the head which grows larger as the chameleon matures, reaching about 5 cm (2.0 in) in the largest adults. Newly hatched offspring are born pastel green in color and develop stripes and different colors as they mature. Adult females are green with white, orange, yellow, or tan mottling. Adult males are brighter with more defined bands of yellow or blue and some mottling.

Coloration can be affected by several factors, including social status. In experimental conditions, young veiled chameleons reared in isolation developed to be darker and duller in color compared to those raised with other individuals. Females change color over the course of their reproductive cycles. Chameleons also tend to change to a much darker color when stressed.

== Subspecies ==
- Chamaeleo calyptratus calyptratus A.M.C. Duméril & A.H.A. Duméril, 1851 – veiled chameleon
- Chamaeleo calyptratus calcarifer W. Peters, 1871 – short-casqued chameleon

== Habitat and distribution ==
The veiled chameleon (Chamaeleo calyptratus) is an arboreal species. It is native to the south-western Arabian Peninsula where the climate is semi-arid and tropical. It is highly susceptible to stress which makes it a species difficult to treat in captivity.

This chameleon lives in a number of habitat types in its native range, including plateaus, mountains, and valleys. Like most other chameleons, it is arboreal, living in trees and other large plants. It prefers warmer temperature, generally between 24 and 35 °C (75 and 95 °F).

== Diet ==
The veiled chameleon is primarily insectivorous. Like other chameleons, the veiled chameleon has the ability to capture large prey but their diets mainly consist of small prey. Green insects seem to be a favorite. However, it is one of several chameleon species also known to consume plants, such as vegetables and fruits. This is believed to perhaps be used as a source of water during the dry season.

== Behavior ==
=== Reproduction and life cycle ===
Veiled chameleons reach sexual maturity at four to five months and breed multiple times in a year. The female lays large clutches of up to 85 white, tough eggs and buries them in sand. The embryos experience a diapause, a length of time (usually 60-75 days) when they are dormant in the egg before they begin developing, increasing temperatures in the substrate initiate development.

A 2004 study found that the embryonic development of chameleons (specifically the veiled chameleon) usually initiates at fertilization and continues until hatching, but sometimes development stunts at the gastrula stage for months after the eggs have been laid. The researchers involved discovered that moisture levels have little to do with this delay, but that temperature plays a determinant role in development time; an increase in ambient temperature initiates development of diapausing embryos.

Juvenile chameleons can grow up to two orders of magnitude in body mass within a year of hatching. The feeding mechanisms (mouth, snout, tongue, jaw) all grow rapidly while still needing to be functional. Thus, the musculoskeletal system of the feeding mechanisms grow with negative allometry relative to snout-vent length (SVL). Studies on captured veiled chameleons showed that velocity of jaw movement tends to be greater in adults than juveniles. Thus in the development phase between adult and juvenile, there is a change in energy storage and tongue projection release mechanisms.

It was found that unlike many other reptiles, the sex ratios of the veiled chameleon are not affected by incubation temperature. Even with differential mortality as a factor, the sex ratio bias is negligible. Anecdotal suggestions of temperature-dependent sex ratios in the veiled chameleon were accrued from reporting and statistical errors.

Veiled chameleons have a naturally short lifespan, so even with good care, they may only live 6-8 years. Males typically live longer than females.

=== Protective coloration ===
For color changing species such as the veiled chameleon, signaling is important between animals to prevent needless energy expended on attacking competition. Stable and nonaggressive states come with a static coloration and will have a dynamic change when that state is altered. Veiled chameleons will typically brighten their coloring before approaching a rival as a signal of aggression. They will also maximize their stripe brightness for as long as possible to signal the strength of their bite. The longer and brighter the stripe lasts correlates to a stronger bite. This may aid in deterring disproportionately weaker or stronger chameleons from challenging. In this way, both contestants will save time, risk, and energy by not challenging an asymmetrical rival. It is likely that such color changing behavior serves as an evolutionary stable strategy to mutually benefit individuals by preventing unnecessary escalation. Brighter and more yellow stripes are also a signal of increased aggression.

While brighter strip coloring typically correlates to more willingness to approach an opponent, brighter head coloring signifies a higher tendency to win fights. Rapidity of color change is also telling of the success of a confrontational outcome. Veiled chameleons are one of the first species to undergo color changing studies focused on speed rather than just intensity of the color. Male veiled chameleons tend to engage in vehement intra-sexual aggressive behavior. Before engaging, males will typically engage the color change laterally from a distance to maximize the opportunity to assess the coloration. When males engage with one another, they tend to begin the confrontation head to head which offers a clear view of the vivid head color change.

All chameleons can engage in color change through a lattice of guanine nanocrystals embedded in a superficially thick layer of dermal iridophores. Veiled chameleons specifically exhibit two superposed layers of iridophores. The two layer structure may allow veiled chameleons to camouflage as well as relay behavioral signaling and may also provide thermal protection.

=== Mating ===
Males display for females during courtship, performing behaviors such as "head rolls" and "chin rubs". Females change color when they are receptive to breeding, and males are more likely to court them during this time.

Females are receptive to mating when pale-blue (robin's egg shade) spots appear on their dorsums. They undergo constant clutch cycles that correlate with their hormonal reproductive status.

Male courtship involves exhibiting bright colors, lateral body flattening, body swaying, and tail curling. Males will approach the females and nudge them with their chin while vibrating from an internal origin during contact. The female will then mount the male and the male uses tarsal spurs to caress the female's flank. Copulation can last anywhere from a few minutes to an hour and can occur several times per day. When copulation is successful, females will darken their green coloration and the intensity of their yellow patterns will increase. If a female is not receptive to the male, her body will turn dark brown to black with white or yellow mottled markings. She may also become aggressive or violent and bite the male if he continues to advance unwanted.

=== Parental care ===
After mating in captivity, a female chameleon will decrease feeding three to four weeks and will spend more time at the bottom of the cage searching for an appropriate egg-laying site. Tunnels will typically reach to the bottom of the container and will be covered with substrate debris after oviposition is completed (which tends to make them difficult to find). Females may dig another tunnel and lay more eggs after about a week. Females should be given easy access between higher sites in the cage and their tunnels via a branch or something similar.

In captivity, eggs should be retrieved then placed into tupperware with a 1:1 ratio mix of vermiculite and water to a depth of about 1-1.5 inches with the eggs buried lengthwise and half covered. Eggs may absorb moisture and expand so they should be placed 0.5 to 1 inches apart from each other. Embryos have been shown to start development sooner when subjected to higher temperatures while degree of moisture showed no significant impact. Eggs should be incubated at 26 to 30 degrees Celsius at a humidity of 95%. Neonates should be allowed at least one day to roam their container before moving. Neonate nurseries should consist of a ten gallon screen top aquarium with a base one third to one half filled with decorative artificial plants. Two to six hatchlings should be raised together for the first few months then moved to adult enclosures with increased amounts of vegetation once they reach four to six inches. They can be placed individually from each other once they reach four to six months old.

== Disease ==
The veiled chameleon, like many reptiles, is susceptible to ocular infections. Similar subcutaneous swellings can be associated with bacterial or fungal abscesses, parasitic infestation, and (rarely) neoplasia.

Juvenile veiled chameleons in captivity often develop nutritional metabolic bone disease but will not develop it if fed dietary supplements of Ca, vitamin A, and vitamin D3 as well as exposure to UVB radiation.

Veiled chameleons in captivity tend to develop maladies such as hypovitaminosis A, hypervitaminosis A, renal failure, dystocia (a failure to lay eggs), respiratory problems (usually due to improper humidity), parasitic infections, and oral cavity problems. Corneal damage can also be caused from an overabundance of UVB radiation.

Serpentoviruses are known to cause respiratory problems in snakes, and veiled chameleons have been found to display similar symptoms to this disease such as sneezing, lethargy, oral mucus secretions, depression, and poor body condition. Juveniles seem to be more impacted by the disease than other age groups, showing a faster onset of symptoms and death.

== Captivity ==
The veiled chameleon is the most common chameleon species in the pet trade; this species has been kept and bred in captivity for almost thirty years. Veiled chameleons are more tolerant of captive conditions than other chameleon species, but are still challenging pets to keep healthy.

== Husbandry ==
Veiled chameleons require specific care and husbandry in order to ensure their health. Captive veiled chameleons should never be released in the wild because they are an invasive species that can cause significant harm to a local ecosystem. It is important to be responsible when owning a veiled chameleon as a pet and never to release them in the wild. There are many local reptile rescue organizations around the world that will be able to take the veiled chameleon if the owner does not want it anymore.

It is important that veiled chameleons have a tall and spacious enclosure that provides plenty of climbing opportunities. Since veiled chameleons are arboreal, an adult veiled chameleon should have at least 2 feet by 2 feet by 4 feet in size with lots of vines to climb on . Veiled chameleon also require a basking spot with a temperature of 90–95 degrees Fahrenheit, with a cooler area of 70–80 degrees Fahrenheit. Veiled chameleons also need a full-spectrum UVB lighting. The UVB light helps metabolize calcium properly.

Veiled chameleons are insectivores and require a diet of live insects such as crickets, roaches, and mealworms. Insects should be dusted with calcium. Veiled chameleons require regular access to water for drinking and humidity. It is important to mist the enclosure several times a day to maintain a properly humidity level, and provide a dripper or other source of running water for drinking. Veiled chameleons drink using water droplets.

== Research ==
Because chameleons possess anatomy that is functionalized for an arboreal habitat (such as split hands and feet for grasping, a prehensile tail, a projectile tongue, independently moving turreted eyes, and laterally compressed bodies), the veiled chameleon is becoming an up-and-coming model for the study of functional morphology and evolutionary developmental biology (ev-devo). A 2019 study assembled an annotated, multi-tissue transcriptome for the veiled chameleon to use as a resource in evolutionary and developmental research.

The veiled chameleon is currently used as an experimental model to study the evolutionary transition from reptilian amniotes to mammalian and avian species.

Squamate reptiles comprise about a third of all living amniotes (animals who lay terrestrial eggs). Most of these species are in late development stages at the time of oviposition. However, veiled chameleons are the exception. They breed readily, do not require a cooling period to induce a reproductive cycle, and females produce about 45–90 eggs multiple times a year. Thus, few animals are required to form a productive breeding colony. This makes them an excellent model organism to study developmental and evolutionary phenomena.

Young chameleons have a heterodont dentition with multi-cuspid teeth in the caudal jaw area and simple mono-cuspid teeth rostrally. Chameleon teeth are also acrodont ankylosed to the bones of the jaw. Odontoblasts produce a layer of predentin that connects the dentine to the supporting bone with both tooth and bone protruding out of the oral cavity and acting as a functional unit. This makes chameleons useful in providing information to study the molecular interaction at the tooth-bone interface in physiological and pathological conditions.

== Invasive species ==
This chameleon is an introduced species in Hawaii, where it is invasive to the local ecosystem. There is a breeding population established on Maui. It can also be found in the wild in Florida, where escaped pets have established populations.

Since veiled chameleons are becoming an invasive species, they are affecting many native species in Hawaii. This chameleon mainly attacks native Hawaiian insects such as the koa looper moth and the cabbage tree emperor moth. These chameleons are also eating native plants as well such as lehua, koa, and hala. These chameleons are also eating small lizards such as the mourning gecko and the gold dust day gecko .

Veiled chameleons are able to lay 30–95 eggs and they are able to lay these eggs three times a year thus making it very fast for them to reproduce. These eggs only take six months to hatch. Veiled chameleons can live up to 4–8 years.

They are becoming a major concern due to their ability to reproduce fast, and their ability to prey upon native Hawaiian birds, and insects. Since veiled chameleons are able to adapt pretty well since they are able to tolerate living areas that can range from dry sea level elevation to wet montane areas up to 12,000 feet elevation.

Efforts are being made to control the population of veiled chameleons in Hawaii. One approach is to capture and remove the chameleons from the wild, mainly in areas that have established breeding populations. There are also educational programs to discourage the release of non-native species in the wild.

The introduction of veiled chameleons in Hawaii has a negative impact on Hawaii's ecosystem. Since the veiled chameleons are generalist predators, compete with native species, and breed rapidly which can lead to overpopulation. Effective measures are necessary in order to control the overpopulation of veiled chameleons.

In 1992, under Title 4, Chapter 71, Section 13.5 of the Hawaii Administrative rules it was made illegal to import, possess, or transport, veiled chameleons without a permit. This law helps the Hawaii Department of Agriculture regulate the further introduction of invasive species. The importation and possession of veiled chameleon can have negative impacts on Hawaii's ecosystem and biodiversity. Enforcement of this regulation helps protect Hawaii's natural resources, preserve the unique cultural, and ecological heritage of the islands. There are penalties for violation this regulation. Penalties can include fines, imprisonment, and the confiscation and removal of the prohibited species.

== Adaptations ==
There are many adaptations of veiled chameleons. Veiled chameleons are known for their ability to change their color to blend in with their surroundings. They are able to change their color in response to their environment, mood, and temperature. They turn black/grey when they are upset. Veiled chameleons camouflage in order to avoid predators and hunt prey more effectively.

Veiled chameleons also have a prehensile tail. Their tail allows them to grip and hold onto branches and other surfaces. This adaptation benefits veiled chameleons are they are able to move more easily through their arboreal habitat and avoid falls.

Veiled chameleons have a long sticky tongue that is twice the length of their body. This adaptation allows them to catch insects from a distance. Veiled chameleons also have turret eyes . Their eyes move independently of each other. Their eyes also allow veiled chameleons to see a 360 degree view of their environment. This allows them to see potential threats more effectively.

Veiled chameleons also have zygodactylous feet. This means that their toes are arranged in two opposing groups of two. This allows them to grasp onto branches with a strong grip, providing them with stability as they move through their arboreal habitat. Veiled chameleons also have a hooded head. Their hooded head helps chameleons collect water. When a droplet collection is on top of a chameleon's hood, the droplet slides down from the hood into the chameleon's mouth. Veiled chameleon's hood also aids in reproduction. Males have a pointer hood than females. Males would fight with each other with their hood when trying to mate with a female. A male chameleon with a large hood is preferred by females as they look more intimidating. This sexual selection is passed off to their offspring in order to ensure the genes of a large hooded skull is passed on.

== Culture ==
The earliest known description of a chameleon was written by Aristotle.

== Gallery ==
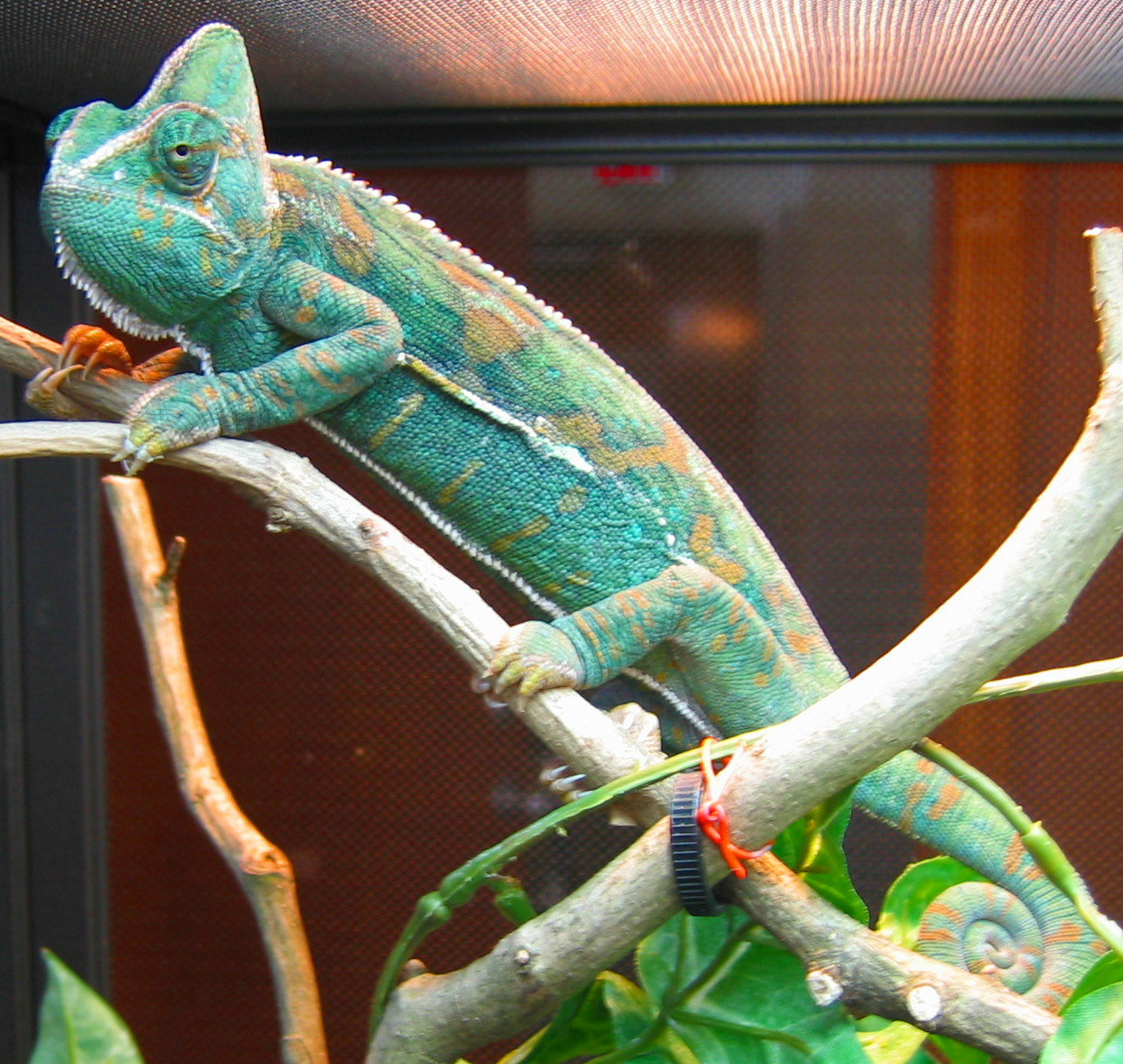

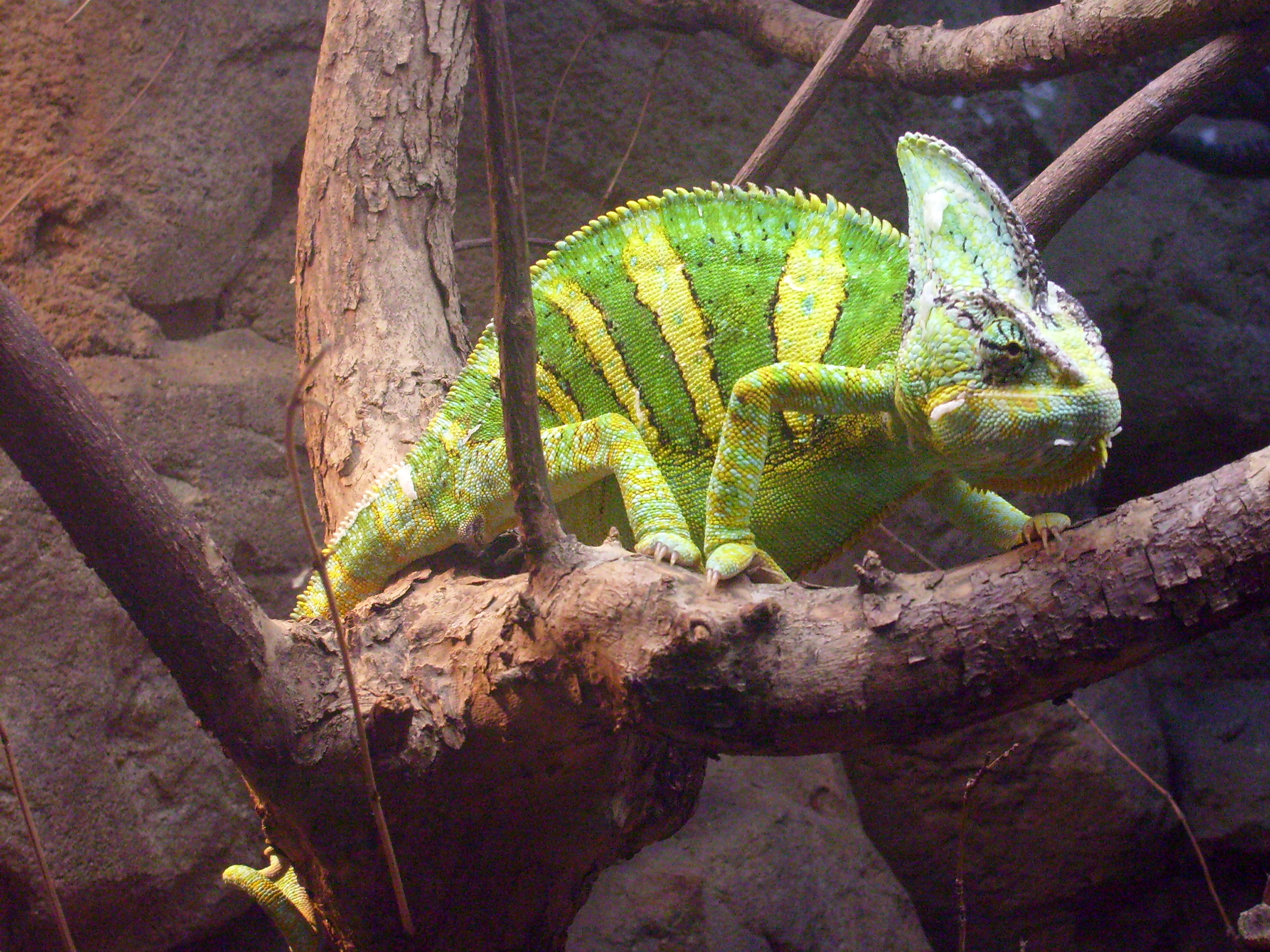

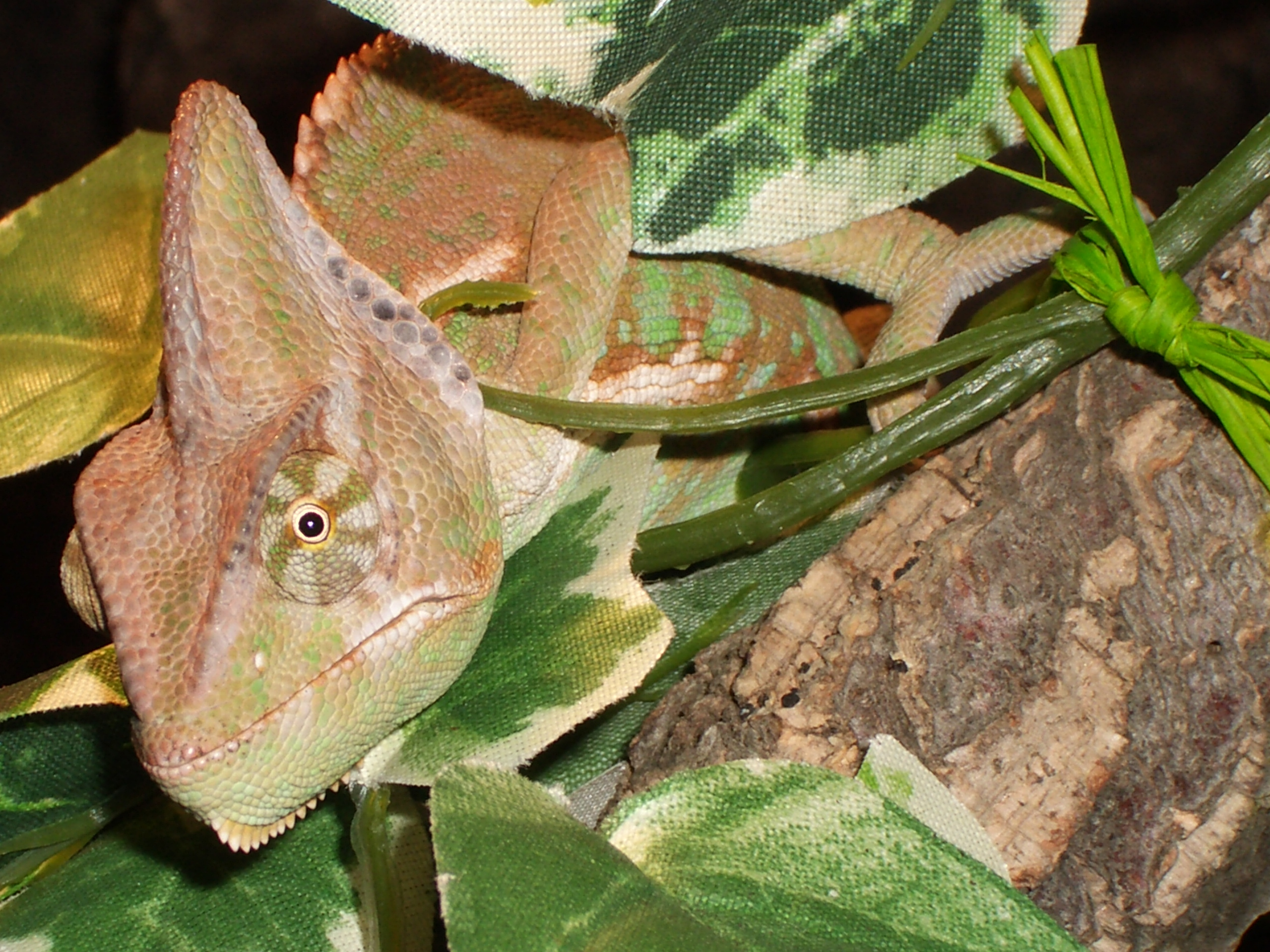
