= Streptomyces rhizosphaericus =

Scientific classification
- Domain: Bacteria
- Kingdom: Bacillati
- Phylum: Actinomycetota
- Class: Actinomycetes
- Order: Streptomycetales
- Family: Streptomycetaceae
- Genus: Streptomyces
- Species: S. rhizosphaericus

Binomial name
- Streptomyces rhizosphaericus Sembiring et al. 2001

Type strain
- DSM 41760, JCM 11447, NBRC 100778, NCIMB 13674, A10P1

Synonyms
- Streptomyces rhizosphaerius

Species of bacterium

Streptomyces rhizosphaericus is a bacterium species from the genus of Streptomyces which has been isolated from the ectorhizosphere of the tree Paraserianthes falcataria from Yogyakarta on Java in Indonesia.

== See also ==
- List of Streptomyces species
