= Erygia sigillata =

Scientific classification
- Kingdom: Animalia
- Phylum: Arthropoda
- Clade: Pancrustacea
- Class: Insecta
- Order: Lepidoptera
- Superfamily: Noctuoidea
- Family: Erebidae
- Genus: Erygia
- Species: E. sigillata

Binomial name
- Erygia sigillata Butler, 1889

Species of moth

Erygia sigillata is a species of moth in the family Erebidae. It was described by British entomologist Arthur Gardiner Butler in 1889. The type locality is Dharmsala, Himachal Pradesh, northern India.

Some sources place the species in the genus Rhynchina as Rhynchina sigillata.

== Distribution ==
The species is recorded from northern India (Himachal Pradesh) and Nepal.
