= Erygia reflectifascia =

Scientific classification
- Kingdom: Animalia
- Phylum: Arthropoda
- Class: Insecta
- Order: Lepidoptera
- Superfamily: Noctuoidea
- Family: Erebidae
- Genus: Erygia
- Species: E. reflectifascia

Binomial name
- Erygia reflectifascia Hampson, 1891

Species of moth

Erygia reflectifascia is a species of moth in the family Erebidae. It is found in India (Tamil Nadu).
