= Streptomyces asiaticus =

Scientific classification
- Domain: Bacteria
- Kingdom: Bacillati
- Phylum: Actinomycetota
- Class: Actinomycetia
- Order: Streptomycetales
- Family: Streptomycetaceae
- Genus: Streptomyces
- Species: S. asiaticus

Binomial name
- Streptomyces asiaticus Sembiring et al. 2001

Type strain
- A14P1, A14P1 (S17), CGMCC 4.1983, DSM 41761, JCM 11443, NBRC 100774, NCIMB 13675, NRRL B-24276

Species of bacterium

Streptomyces asiaticus is a bacterium species from the genus Streptomyces which has been isolated from the ectorhizosphere from the plant Falcataria moluccana (= Paraserianthes falcataria) in Java on the island Yogyakarta in Indonesia.

== See also ==
- List of Streptomyces species
