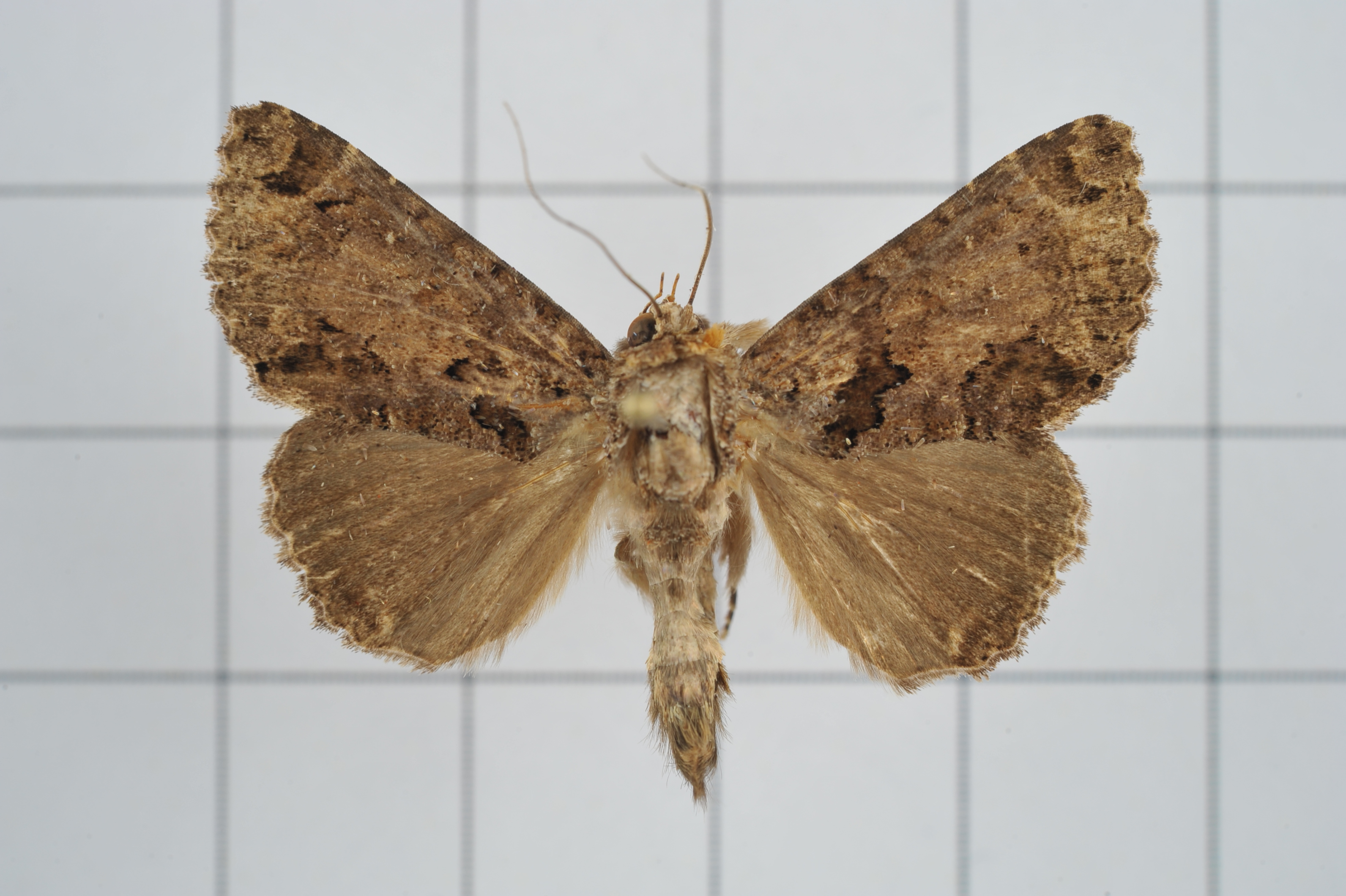

Scientific classification
- Kingdom: Animalia
- Phylum: Arthropoda
- Class: Insecta
- Order: Lepidoptera
- Superfamily: Noctuoidea
- Family: Erebidae
- Genus: Erygia
- Species: E. apicalis

Binomial name
- Erygia apicalis Guenée, 1852

Synonyms
- Calicula exempta Walker, 1858; Calicula squamiplena Walker, 1858; Erygia usta Walker, 1865; Dianthaecia geometroides Walker, 1865; Sypna watanabii Holland, 1889; Erygia tamsi Hulstaert, 1924

= Erygia apicalis =

Species of moth

Erygia apicalis is a moth of the family Erebidae first described by Achille Guenée in 1852. It is found from the Indo-Australian tropics of India, Sri Lanka to Japan, Australia (where it has been recorded from the Northern Territory, Queensland and New South Wales) and the Solomon Islands.

== Description ==
The wingspan is about 40 mm. Head and thorax consist of dark reddish brown scales. Abdomen possess reddish brown dorsal tufts. Male has black anal tufts. Forewings are dark and reddish brown with numerous indistinct waved lines. The sub-basal, irregular antemedial and postmedial lines are excurved beyond the cell being the most conspicuous character. A red-brown band found inside the antemedial line which runs from cell to inner margin. There are some red-brown marks found near apex and outer angle, and a crenulate marginal line as well. Hindwings are fuscous with a reddish patch near center of outer margin.

The caterpillar is dark brown with yellow speckles. Ventrally it is pale green with a red mark under each segment. Branched filaments project out of the sides. First two proleg pairs reduced, so it shows looping movements.

The larvae feed on Acacia, Albizia, Desmodium, Flemingia, Pueraria and Wisteria species.
