= Erygia plagifera =

Scientific classification
- Kingdom: Animalia
- Phylum: Arthropoda
- Class: Insecta
- Order: Lepidoptera
- Superfamily: Noctuoidea
- Family: Erebidae
- Genus: Erygia
- Species: E. plagifera

Binomial name
- Erygia plagifera (Walker, 1859)

Synonyms
- Briarda plagifera Walker, 1859; Felinia plagifera

Species of moth

Erygia plagifera is a moth of the family Erebidae. It is found in Singapore.

Adults are cinereous, tinged with ferruginous. The forewings have a blackish band near the base and a large blackish spot on the reniform mark, as well as a diffuse blackish spot near the tip of the costa. The exterior and submarginal lines are brown, double and denticulated and the space along their borders is somewhat clouded. The hindwings are pale cinereous and semihyaline and have very broad brown borders.
