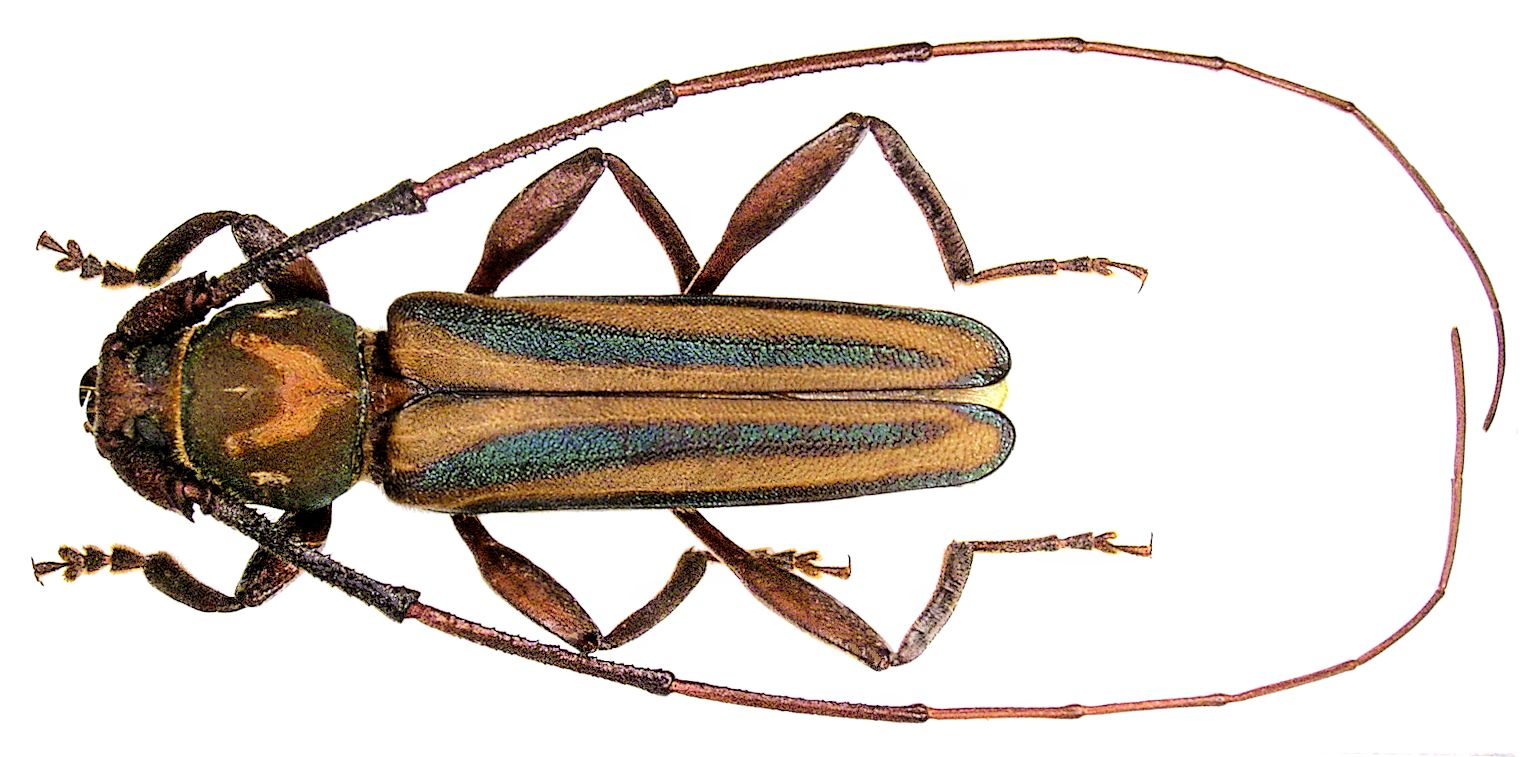
- Xystrocera dispar

Scientific classification
- Kingdom: Animalia
- Phylum: Arthropoda
- Class: Insecta
- Order: Coleoptera
- Suborder: Polyphaga
- Infraorder: Cucujiformia
- Family: Cerambycidae
- Subfamily: Cerambycinae
- Tribe: Xystrocerini
- Genus: Xystrocera; Audinet-Serville, 1834

= Xystrocera =

Genus of beetles

Xystrocera is a genus of beetles in the subfamily Cerambycinae and the tribe Xystrocerini, with a relatively world-wide distribution.

== Species ==
Xystrocera includes the following according to GBIF:

1. Xystrocera abrupta Aurivillius, 1908
2. Xystrocera alcyonea Pascoe, 1866
3. Xystrocera ansorgei Gahan, 1898
4. Xystrocera antennata Adlbauer, 2011
5. Xystrocera apiculata Pascoe, 1869
6. Xystrocera asperata Thomson, 1858
7. Xystrocera australasiae Hope, 1842
8. Xystrocera bomfordi Veiga-Ferreira, 1971
9. Xystrocera boulardi Breuning & Teocchi, 1972
10. Xystrocera brunnea Aurivillius, 1924
11. Xystrocera buquetii Thomson, 1858
12. Xystrocera carinipennis Breuning, 1957
13. Xystrocera chalybeata Gahan, 1890
14. Xystrocera conradti Breuning, 1957
15. Xystrocera curvipes Breuning, 1957
16. Xystrocera cyanella Chevrolat, 1855
17. Xystrocera cyanipennis Breuning, 1957
18. Xystrocera danilevskyi Vives, 2013
19. Xystrocera devittata Kolbe, 1893
20. Xystrocera dispar Fåhraeus, 1872
21. Xystrocera dundensis Lepesme, 1953
22. Xystrocera elongata Breuning, 1957
23. Xystrocera erosa Pascoe, 1864
24. Xystrocera femorata Chevrolat, 1855
25. Xystrocera ferreirae Martins, 1980
26. Xystrocera festiva Thomson, 1861
27. Xystrocera flavovariegata Breuning, 1957
28. Xystrocera frontalis Thomson, 1858
29. Xystrocera fuscomaculata Breuning, 1957
30. Xystrocera globosa (Olivier, 1795)
31. Xystrocera gracilipes Breuning, 1957
32. Xystrocera granulipennis Breuning, 1957
33. Xystrocera granulithorax Breuning, 1964
34. Xystrocera holatripes Breuning, 1957
35. Xystrocera interrupta Jordan, 1903
36. Xystrocera laeta Péringuey, 1892
37. Xystrocera lujae Hintz, 1911
38. Xystrocera marginipennis Murray, 1870
39. Xystrocera matilei Breuning & Teocchi, 1972
40. Xystrocera minuscula Breuning, 1957
41. Xystrocera minuta Jordan, 1894
42. Xystrocera natalensis Corinta-Ferreira, 1954
43. Xystrocera nigrita Audinet-Serville, 1834
44. Xystrocera nitidicollis Quedenfeldt, 1883
45. Xystrocera orientalis Breuning, 1961
46. Xystrocera pauliani Lepesme & Breuning, 1951
47. Xystrocera pseudosimilis Breuning, 1957
48. Xystrocera reducta Duffy, 1954
49. Xystrocera rhodesiana Veiga-Ferreira, 1954
50. Xystrocera ruficornis Corinta-Ferreira, 1954
51. Xystrocera rufobrunnea Breuning, 1957
52. Xystrocera semperi Breuning, 1957
53. Xystrocera similis Jordan, 1894
54. Xystrocera skeletoides Breuning, 1957
55. Xystrocera sudanica Breuning, 1957
56. Xystrocera teocchii Adlbauer, 2011
57. Xystrocera ugandensis Martins, 1980
58. Xystrocera unicolor Martins, 1980
59. Xystrocera velutina Jordan, 1894
60. Xystrocera vicina Corinta-Ferreira, 1954
61. Xystrocera violascens Franz, 1942
62. Xystrocera virescens Newman, 1840
63. Xystrocera viridilucens Breuning, 1957
64. Xystrocera vittata (Fabricius, 1793)
