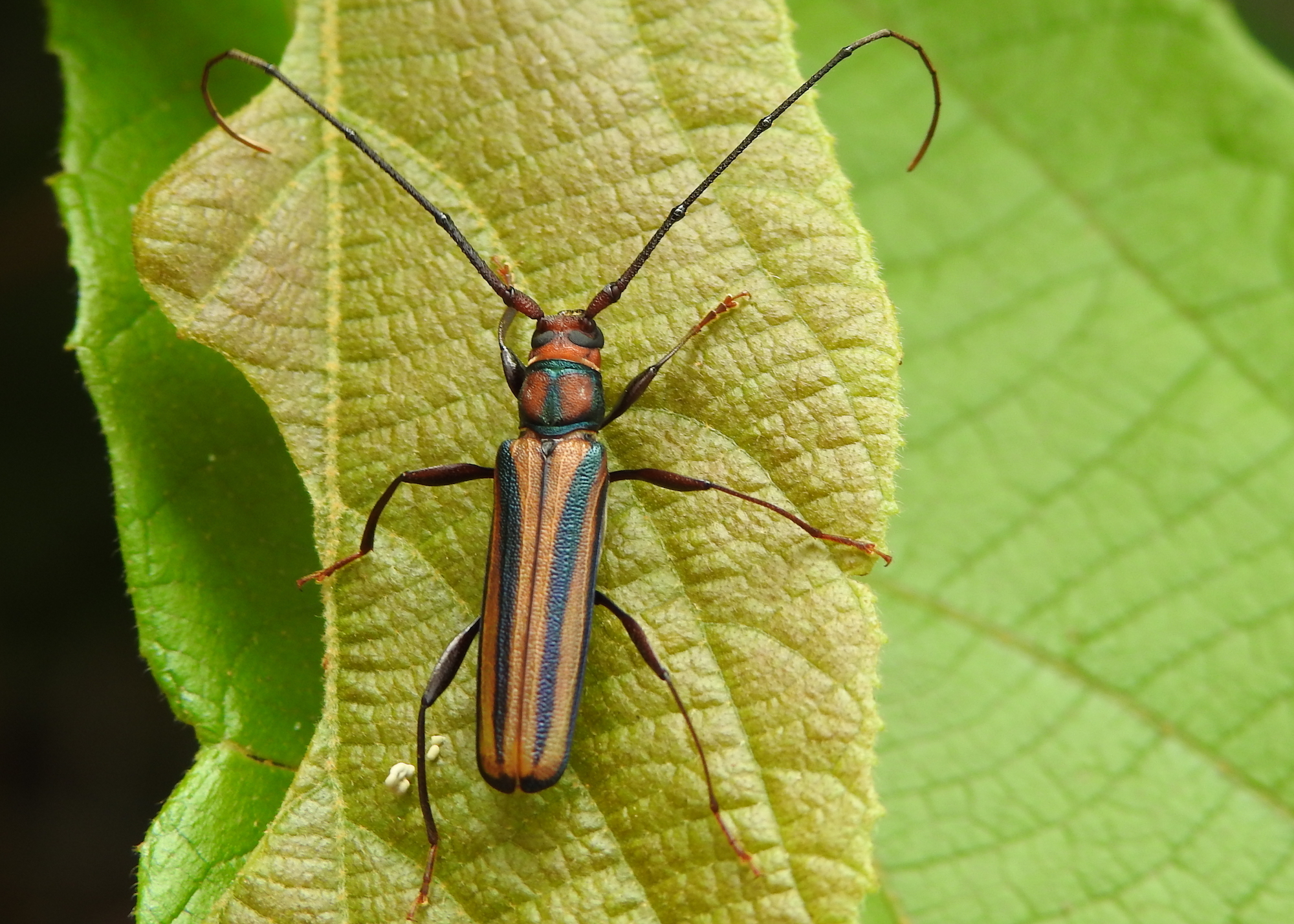

Scientific classification
- Kingdom: Animalia
- Phylum: Arthropoda
- Clade: Pancrustacea
- Class: Insecta
- Order: Coleoptera
- Suborder: Polyphaga
- Infraorder: Cucujiformia
- Family: Cerambycidae
- Genus: Xystrocera
- Species: X. globosa

Binomial name
- Xystrocera globosa (Olivier, 1795)

Synonyms
- Cerambyx globosus Olivier, 1795

= Xystrocera globosa =

Species of beetle

Xystrocera globosa is a species of beetle in the family Cerambycidae. It was described by Guillaume-Antoine Olivier in 1795. It is distributed widely in southern and southeast Asia, as well as Australasia, and has been introduced to other parts of the world.

== Taxonomy ==
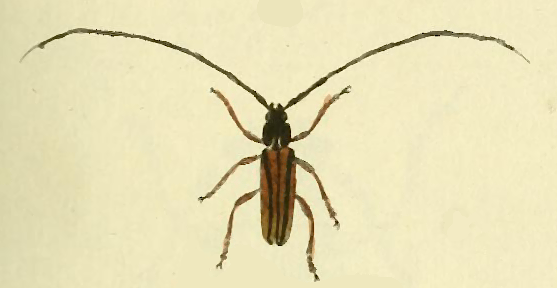
This illustration, published as part of an appendix in 1808, accompanied Olivier's original description.

Xystrocera globosa was first scientifically described by Guillaume-Antoine Olivier in 1795 with the name Cerambix globosus, as part of the fourth volume of Entomologie, ou Histoire Naturelle des Insectes (transl. Entomology, or Natural History of Insects). He described its appearance and colour and noted that it was found around Batavia. A later volume of the series, published in 1808, provided illustrations of the species described, including C. globosus.

The current genus name, Xystrocera, derives from two Greek words: ξύστρα, meaning a grooming tool, and χέρας, meaning a horn. The genus Xystrocera was established by Jean Guillaume Audinet-Serville in 1834 and X. globosa was classified in it since its inception. Although Serville did not designate a type species for his genus, X. globosa has been retroactively designated for it.

Xystrocera globosa has several common names: it is known as the "Lebbek borer", the "monkeypod roundheaded borer", and the "green-lined albizzia longicorn".

In 2019, Chinese specimens were collected and had their mitochondrial DNA extracted from leg tissue; it was then sequenced and compared to other species. The mitogenome of X. globosa comprises 15707 base pairs with 13 protein-coding genes. The phylogenetic analysis based on the mitochondrial DNA, which included 19 species, showed Xystrocera globosa as a sister taxon to Xylotrechus grayii.

== Description ==
A Xystrocera globosa is a reddish-brown longhorn beetle measuring from 1.5 to 3.2 centimetres (0.59 to 1.3 in) long. It can be distinguished from other members of the genus Xystrocera by its ruddy antennae, the dark bands on its elytra (the hardened forewings), and narrow bands on its sides.

== Distribution ==
Xystrocera globosa is found in temperate and tropical Asia: it is known from Japan to Sri Lanka, including India, Pakistan, and the Korean peninsula; and from southeast Asia, from Thailand and Vietnam down through the Malay peninsula and Maritime Southeast Asia, including the Philippines, to New Guinea and northern Australia. It is equally known from Madagascar, Egypt, Puerto Rico, and Mauritius, and is found in both tropical Africa and the Nearctic. The species is introduced to the Caribbean. The beetles have also been reported from Hawaii, in Oahu. Maui and Honolulu; they were very likely introduced by humans. It is also introduced to Israel.
