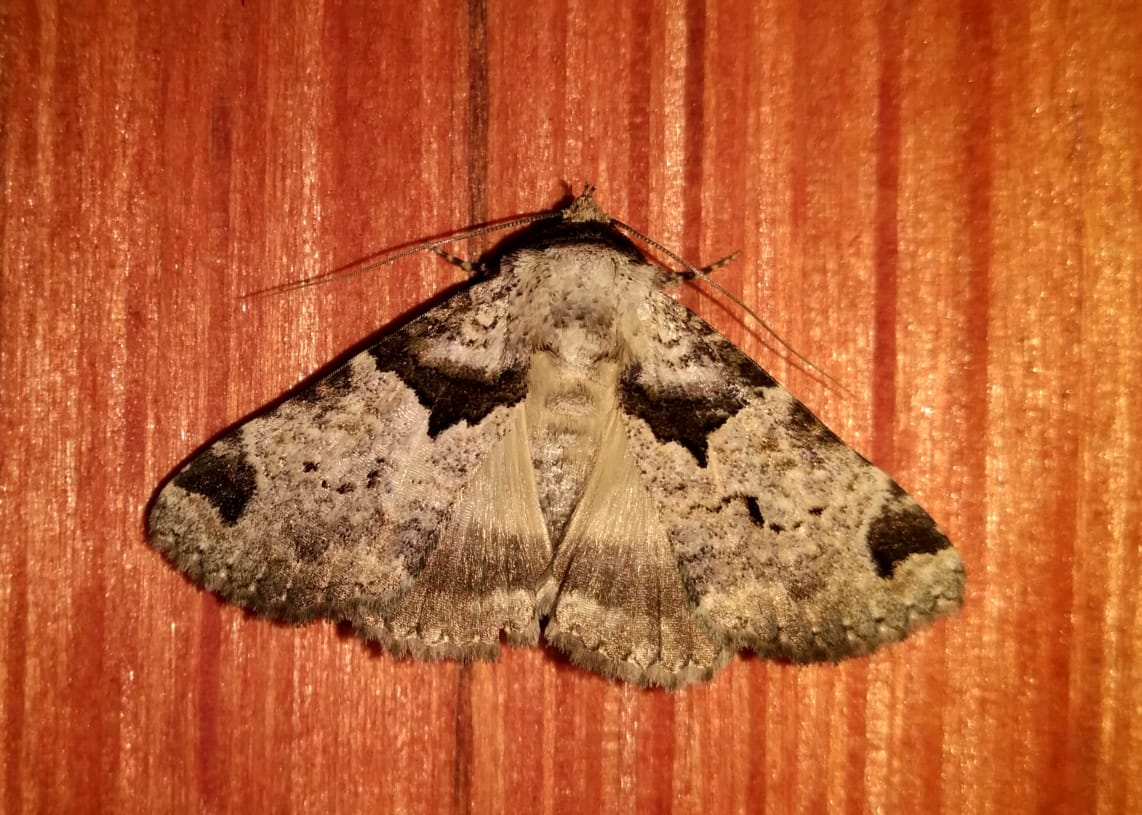

Scientific classification
- Kingdom: Animalia
- Phylum: Arthropoda
- Class: Insecta
- Order: Lepidoptera
- Superfamily: Noctuoidea
- Family: Erebidae
- Genus: Erygia
- Species: E. spissa

Binomial name
- Erygia spissa (Guenée, 1852)

Synonyms
- Felinia spissa Guenée, 1852; Felinia spissata Guenée, 1852; Briarda decens Walker, [1858]; Polydesma spissa Hampson, 1853

= Erygia spissa =

Species of moth

Erygia spissa is a moth of the family Erebidae first described by Achille Guenée in 1852. It is found from the Indian subcontinent to New Guinea, where it is found in lowland habitats, including heath forests and coastal forests.

== Description ==
Its wingspan is about 42–50 mm. Palpi with longer third joint. Hindlegs of male tufted with long hair to the extremity of the tarsi. Mid tibia of male absent masses of flocculent hair contained in a fold. Body greyish brown. Forewings with numerous indistinct waved lines. A dentate antemedial waved line on vein 2 and with a diffused reddish brown band inside it. A dark line on discocellulars with an ill-defined brownish patch on the costa found above it. A post-medial waved line excurved beyond the cell and a triangular patch on costa before apex. Hindwings wit ochreous basal area and fuscous outer area. A pale streak is found at the anal angle. Cilia pale at apex and anal angle.

Pupa lacks a bloom. The larvae feed on Acacia and Xylia species, as well as Paraserianthes falcataria (= Falcataria moluccana).
