= Erygia =

Scientific classification
- Kingdom: Animalia
- Phylum: Arthropoda
- Clade: Pancrustacea
- Class: Insecta
- Order: Lepidoptera
- Superfamily: Noctuoidea
- Family: Erebidae
- Subfamily: Erebinae
- Tribe: Erebini
- Genus: Erygia; Guenée in Boisduval & Guenée, 1852

Synonyms
- Calicula Walker, 1858; Felinia Guenée, 1852; Ansa Walker, 1858; Briarda Walker, [1858]; Erygansa Bethune-Baker, 1906

Genus of moths

Erygia is a genus of moths in the family Erebidae erected by Achille Guenée in 1852.

== Description ==
Palpi upturned and very slender, almost naked, where the second joint reaching vertex of head, and third joint variable in length. Antennae minutely ciliated in male. Metathorax with a large spreading tuft. Abdomen with dorsal tufts on proximal segments. Male with a large anal tuft. Tibia spineless. Femur fringed with long hair, as also fore tibia. The mid tibia clothed with short hair and hind tibia and tarsi with long hair. Forewings with quadrate apex. A tooth of scaled usually found at outer angle. Cilia crenulate.

== Species ==
- Erygia antecedens (Walker, 1858)
- Erygia apicalis Guenée, 1852
- Erygia plagifera (Walker, 1859)
- Erygia precedens (Walker, 1858)
- Erygia reflectifascia Hampson, 1891
- Erygia semiplaga (Walker, 1869)
- Erygia sigillata Butler, 1889
- Erygia spissa (Guenée, 1852)
- Erygia subapicalis (Walker, 1870)
