= Erygia semiplaga =

Scientific classification
- Kingdom: Animalia
- Phylum: Arthropoda
- Class: Insecta
- Order: Lepidoptera
- Superfamily: Noctuoidea
- Family: Erebidae
- Genus: Erygia
- Species: E. semiplaga

Binomial name
- Erygia semiplaga (Walker, 1859)

Synonyms
- Briarda semiplaga Walker, 1859

Species of moth

Erygia semiplaga is a moth of the family Erebidae found in Honduras.
