= Streptomyces cangkringensis =

Scientific classification
- Domain: Bacteria
- Kingdom: Bacillati
- Phylum: Actinomycetota
- Class: Actinomycetes
- Order: Streptomycetales
- Family: Streptomycetaceae
- Genus: Streptomyces
- Species: S. cangkringensis

Binomial name
- Streptomyces cangkringensis Sembiring et al. 2001

Type strain
- D13P3, D13P3 (S23), DSM 41769, JCM 11444, NBRC 100775, NCIMB 13684, NRRL B-24277

Species of bacterium

Streptomyces cangkringensis is a bacterium species from the genus of Streptomyces which has been isolated from rhizosphere soil from the plant Falcataria moluccana (= Paraserianthes falcataria) from Yogyakarta from the island Java in Indonesia.

== See also ==
- List of Streptomyces species
