= Erygia subapicalis =

Scientific classification
- Kingdom: Animalia
- Phylum: Arthropoda
- Class: Insecta
- Order: Lepidoptera
- Superfamily: Noctuoidea
- Family: Erebidae
- Genus: Erygia
- Species: E. subapicalis

Binomial name
- Erygia subapicalis (Walker, 1870)

Synonyms
- Briarda subapicalis Walker, 1870

Species of moth

Erygia subapicalis is a moth of the family Erebidae. It was described from Wady Ferran in Arabia.
