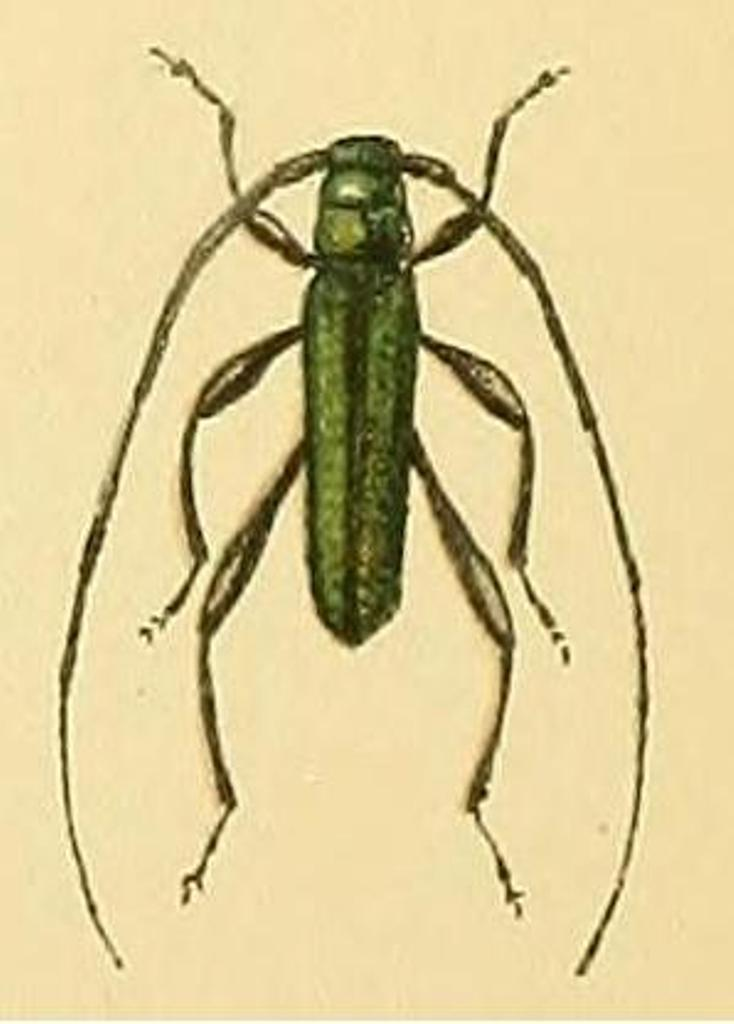

Scientific classification
- Kingdom: Animalia
- Phylum: Arthropoda
- Class: Insecta
- Order: Coleoptera
- Suborder: Polyphaga
- Infraorder: Cucujiformia
- Family: Cerambycidae
- Subfamily: Cerambycinae
- Tribe: Xystrocerini
- Genus: Xystrocera
- Species: X. alcyonea

Binomial name
- Xystrocera alcyonea Pascoe, 1866

Synonyms
- Xystocera alcyonea Pascoe, 1866; Xystrocera promecoides Pascoe, 1888

= Xystrocera alcyonea =

Species of beetle

Xystrocera alcyonea (sometimes spelled Xystocera alcyonea) is a species of beetle in the family Cerambycidae. It was described by Pascoe in 1866, recorded from Malaysia.
