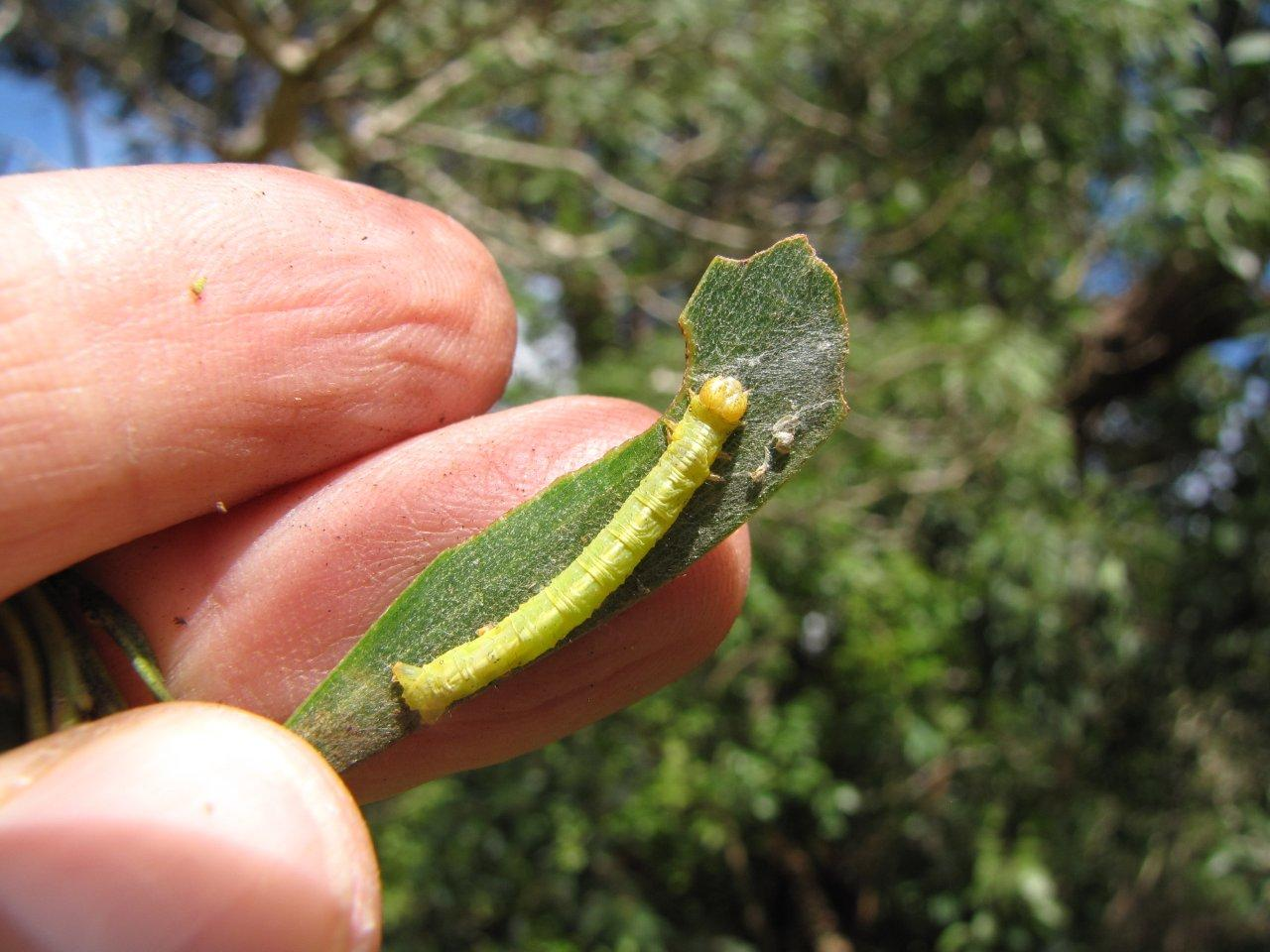

Scientific classification
- Domain: Eukaryota
- Kingdom: Animalia
- Phylum: Arthropoda
- Class: Insecta
- Order: Lepidoptera
- Family: Geometridae
- Genus: Scotorythra
- Species: S. paludicola

Binomial name
- Scotorythra paludicola (Butler, 1879)

Synonyms
- Pseudocoremia paludicola Butler, 1879; Scotorythra idolias Meyrick, 1899

= Scotorythra paludicola =

Species of moth

Scotorythra paludicola, the koa looper moth, is a moth of the family Geometridae. It was first described by Arthur Gardiner Butler in 1879. It is endemic to the Hawaiian islands of Kauai, Oahu, Maui and Hawaii.

During a recent outbreak of S. paludicola in 2013 on Hawaiʻi Island, larvae were found to feed on isolated populations of the invasive tree Falcataria moluccana near Akaka Falls State Park. Laboratory feeding trials of these larvae showed that they could complete their development at the same rate on both the normal host (Acacia koa) and the invasive tree (Falcataria moluccana). Three other exotic tree species, Acacia confusa, Prosopis pallida, and Leucaena leucocephala were not suitable host plants and all the larvae tested on these species died after 5 days of feeding.
