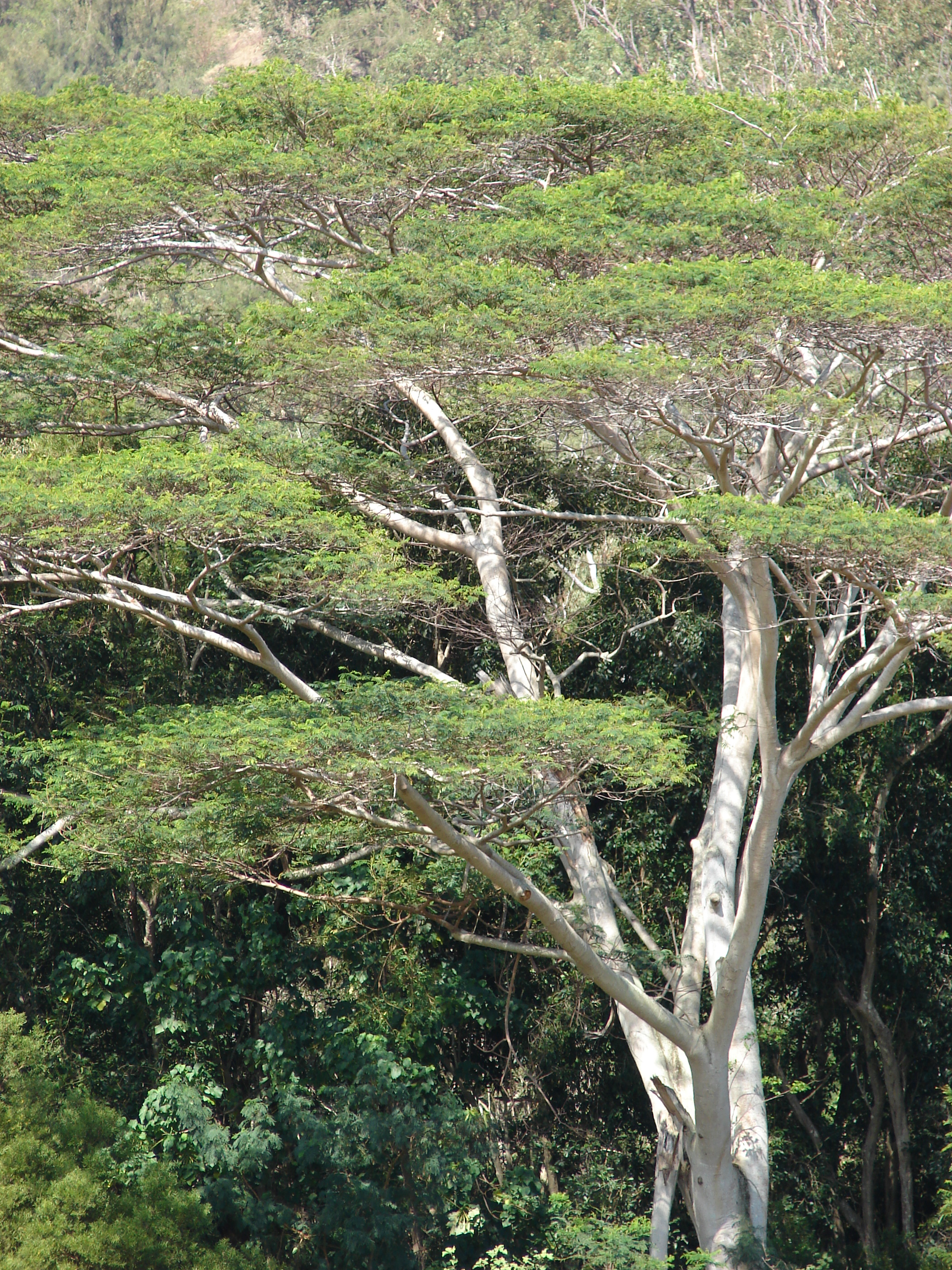
- Specimen at Waiehu, Maui

Conservation status
- Least Concern (IUCN 3.1)

Scientific classification
- Kingdom: Plantae
- Clade: Embryophytes
- Clade: Tracheophytes
- Clade: Angiosperms
- Clade: Eudicots
- Clade: Rosids
- Order: Fabales
- Family: Fabaceae
- Subfamily: Caesalpinioideae
- Clade: Mimosoid clade
- Genus: Falcataria
- Species: F. falcata

Binomial name
- Falcataria falcata (L.) Greuter & R.Rankin

Synonyms
- Adenanthera falcata L.; Adenanthera falcataria L.; Albizia eymae Fosberg; Albizia falcata (L.) Backer; Albizia falcataria (L.) Fosberg; Albizia fulva C.T.White & W.D.Francis ex Lane-Poole; Albizia moluccana Miq.; Falcataria moluccana (Miq.) Barneby & J.W.Grimes; Paraserianthes falcataria (L.) I.C.Nielsen; Paraserianthes falcataria subsp. fulva (C.T.White & W.D.Francis ex Lane-Poole) I.C.Nielsen; Paraserianthes falcataria subsp. solomonensis I.C.Nielsen; Pithecellobium falcatum (L.) Kosterm.; Paraserianthes falcatoria (L.) I.C.Nielsen (Spelling variant)

= Falcataria falcata =

Species of flowering plant

Falcataria falcata (syns. Albizia falcata, Falcataria moluccana and Paraserianthes falcataria), commonly known as the Moluccan albizia, is a species of fast-growing tree in the family Fabaceae. It is native to the Maluku Islands, New Guinea, the Bismarck Archipelago, and the Solomon Islands. It is cultivated for timber throughout South Asian and Southeast Asian countries. This tree is considered to be invasive in Hawaii, American Samoa and several other island nations in the Pacific and Indian Oceans. It reaches about 30 m (100 ft) tall in nature, and has a massive trunk and an open crown. It is most famous for its remarkable rate of growth. It has been recorded growing 16 m (52 ft) in three years, 33 m (108 ft) in nine years and 45 m (148 ft) in seventeen years.

== Common names ==
Falcataria falcata is cultivated throughout the wet tropical and subtropical regions of the world and so has many common names. These include: albizia (Hawaii), Moluccan albizia, sengon (Java), salawaku (Maluku), jeungjing (Indonesia), ai-samtuco (Tetun, Timor-Leste), batai (Malaysia), kerosin tree (Pohnpei), sau, Moluccan sau, falcata (Philippines), and Tamaligi (Samoa).

== Description ==
- Leaves – twice pinnately compound with small leaflets
- Flowers – creamy white small flowers are faintly fragrant
- Fruits – pods that fall from the trees when mature.
- Bark – smooth, light or white bark.
- Wood – light tan with long fibres.
- Wood density=280 kg / m^{3} (based on weight and volume at 18% moisture content)
- Chromosome number 2n=26.

The tree has become invasive in forests in Hawaii and on other Pacific islands, like New Caledonia.

== Uses ==
- Commercial uses – Falcataria falcata softwood is used to make match-sticks, chopsticks, shipping pallets, and wooden boxes. The pulp is used for paper-making. Plywood production and veneer based products have increasingly been an important use for these trees.

== Insects found on Falcataria falcata ==
In Hawaii the caterpillars of the endemic Hawaiian koa looper (Scotorythra paludicola) have been found to defoliate Falcataria falcata and complete their development on this invasive tree without the larvae eating the leaves of their native host Acacia koa.

In Borneo the following moth species have been identified as feeding on Falcataria falcata.

- Lymantria brunneiplaga – Family Lymantriidae
- Hypochrosis cryptopyrrhata – Family Geometridae
- Erygia spissa – Family Erebidae
- Hypopyra pudens – Family Erebidae

In the broader Indomalayan region the following species have also been found feeding on F. falcata:

- Charaxes bernardus – Lepidoptera: Family Nymphalidae
- Eurema blanda and Eurema hecabe – Lepidoptera: Family Pieridae. Caterpillars of these two species are pests of young trees and seedlings (respectively).
- Xystrocera festiva – Coleoptera: Family Cerambycidae. Large groups of larvae feed under the bark can cause tree death in plantation forestry.

The industrial tree plantation wood Falcataria falcata was found to be susceptible to the species of drywood termites, Cryptotermes cynocephalus, in trials in the Philippines. This tree species has also been found to be susceptible to the subterranean termite species Coptotermes formosanus in tests conducted in Indonesia and Hawaii. The Formosan subterranean termites consumed 49 ± 4.0 μg/termite/day of F. falcata wood in the Indonesian Standard (SNI) laboratory tests or 66 ± 6.5 μg/termite/day under the Japanese Standard (JIS) tests for termite susceptibility.

== Diseases ==
Falcataria falcata is the primary host of the gall rust fungus Uromycladium falcatarium, and has also been recorded as a host of Uromycladium tepperianum. Both of these gall rust species cause severe damage throughout all stages of the tree's growth.

Two Actinomycetales bacteria Streptomyces asiaticus and S. cangkringensis have been isolated from the rhizosphere soil surrounding F. falcata in Indonesia. Although at least 10 species of Streptomyces are plant pathogens it is unclear if these two species have any negative impacts on the roots or other tissues of this tree.

== Gallery ==
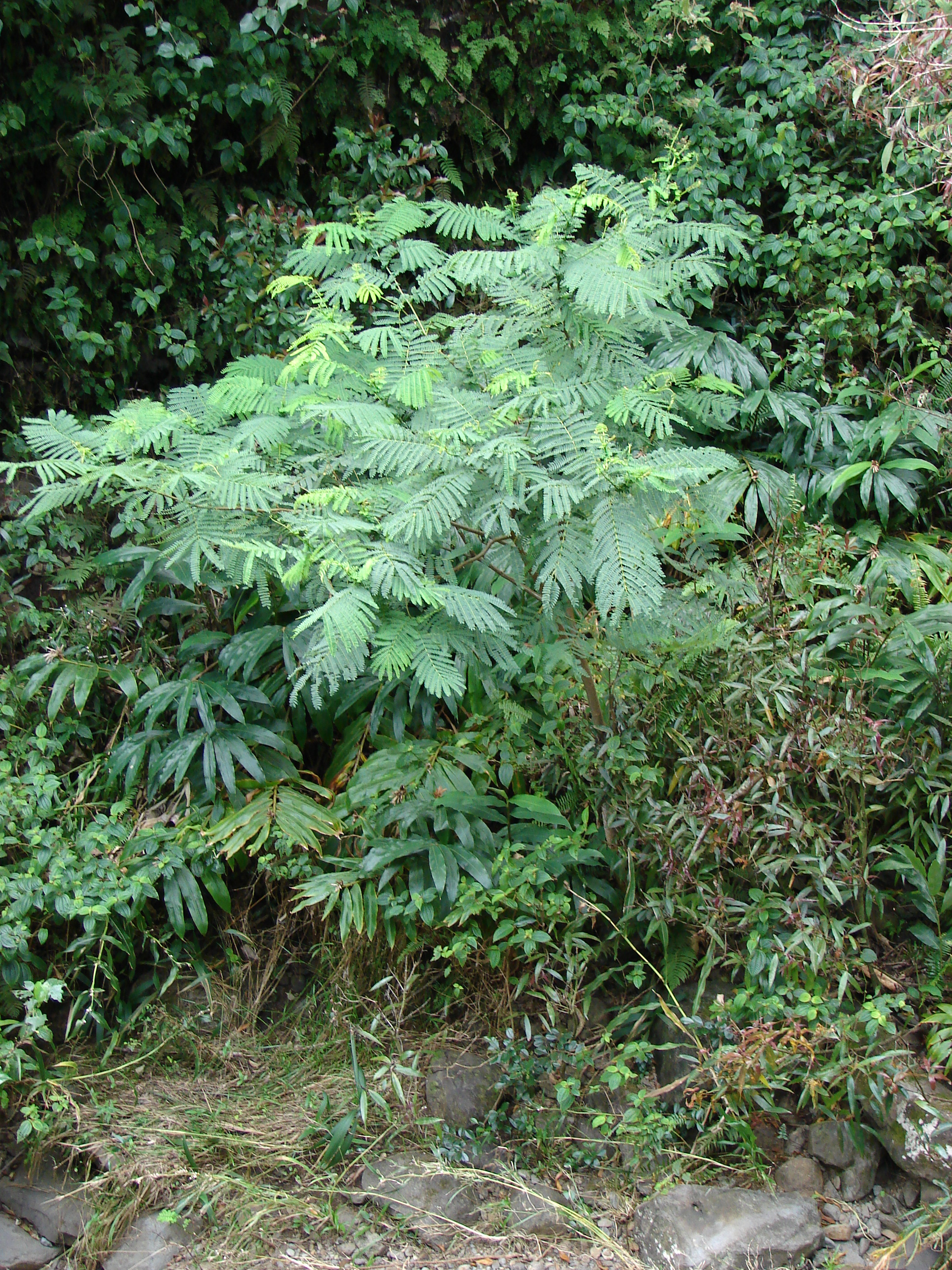
Sapling in forest

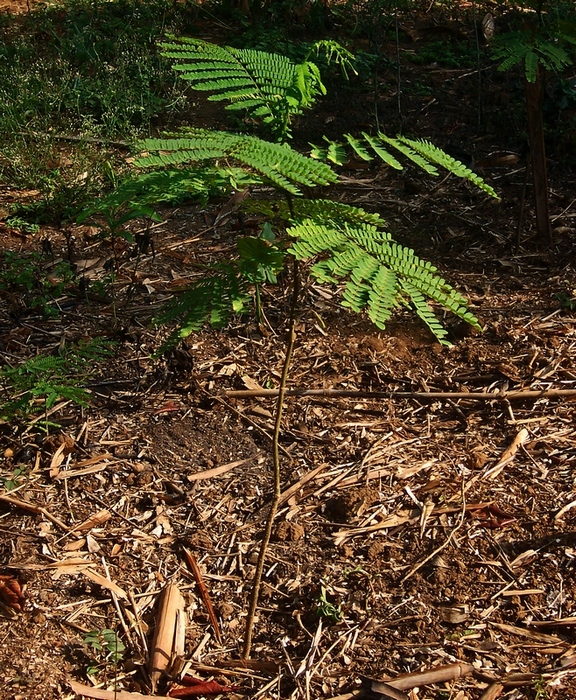
Seedling in Indonesia

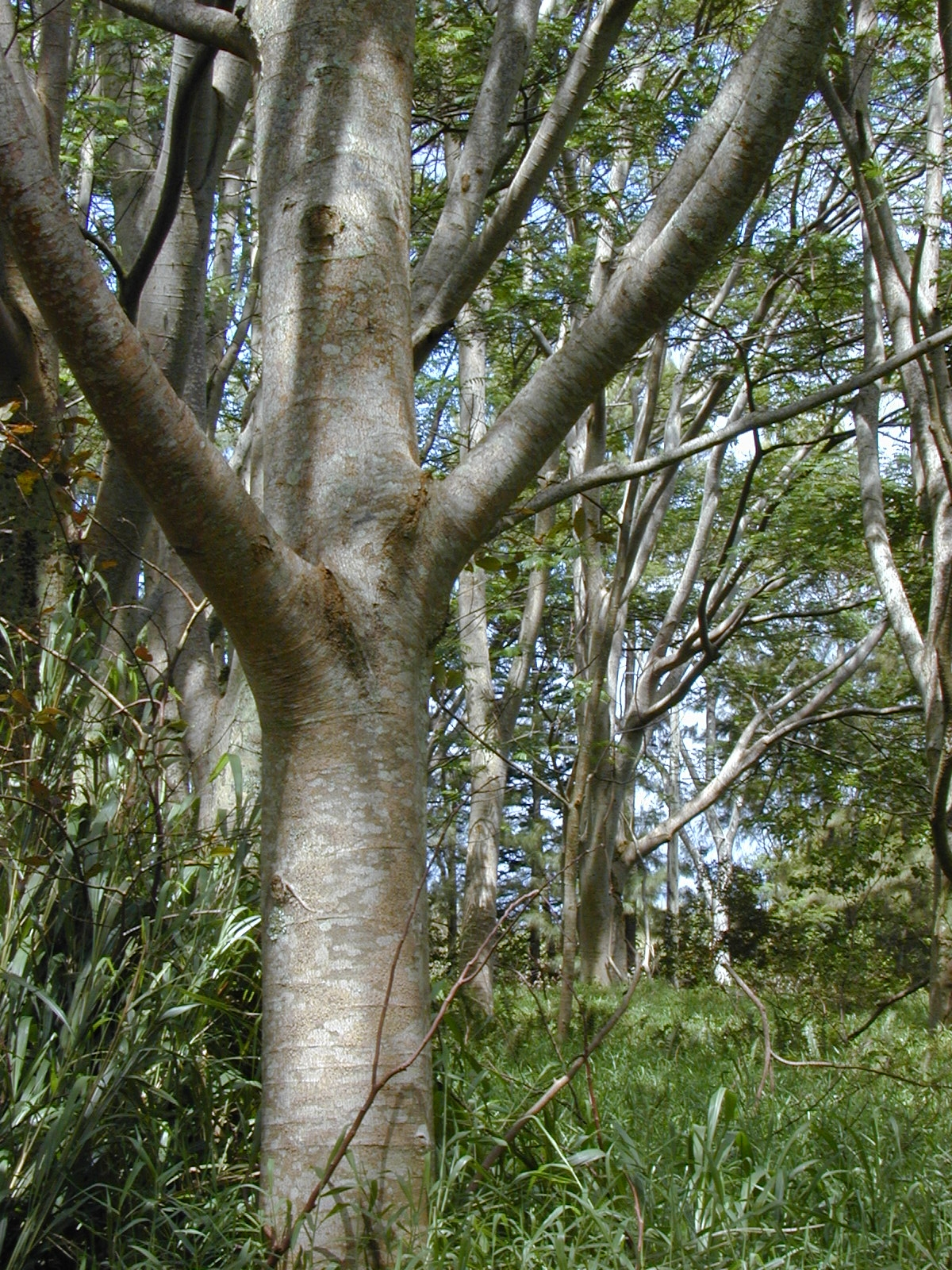
Bark

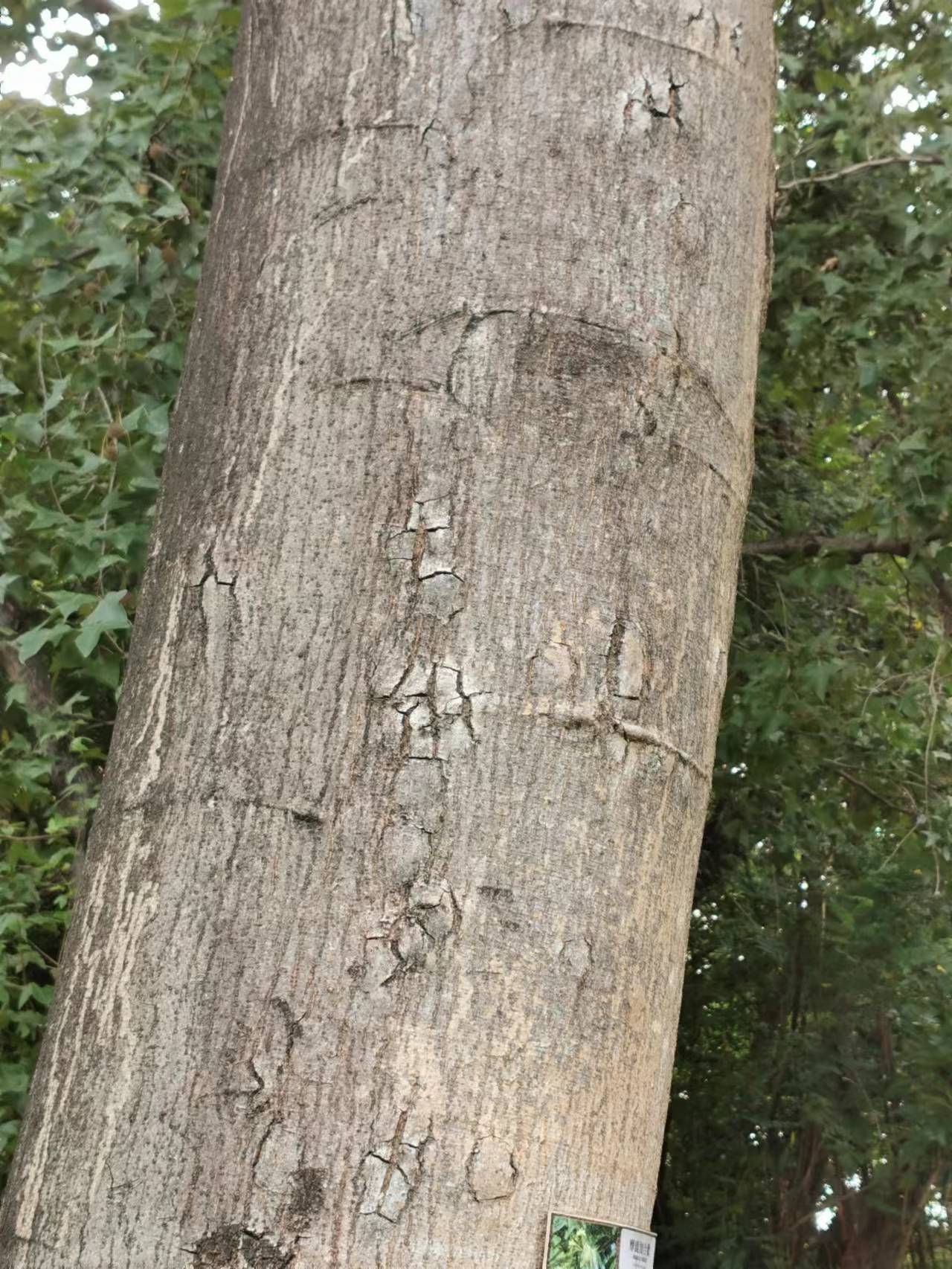
Cracked bark shape

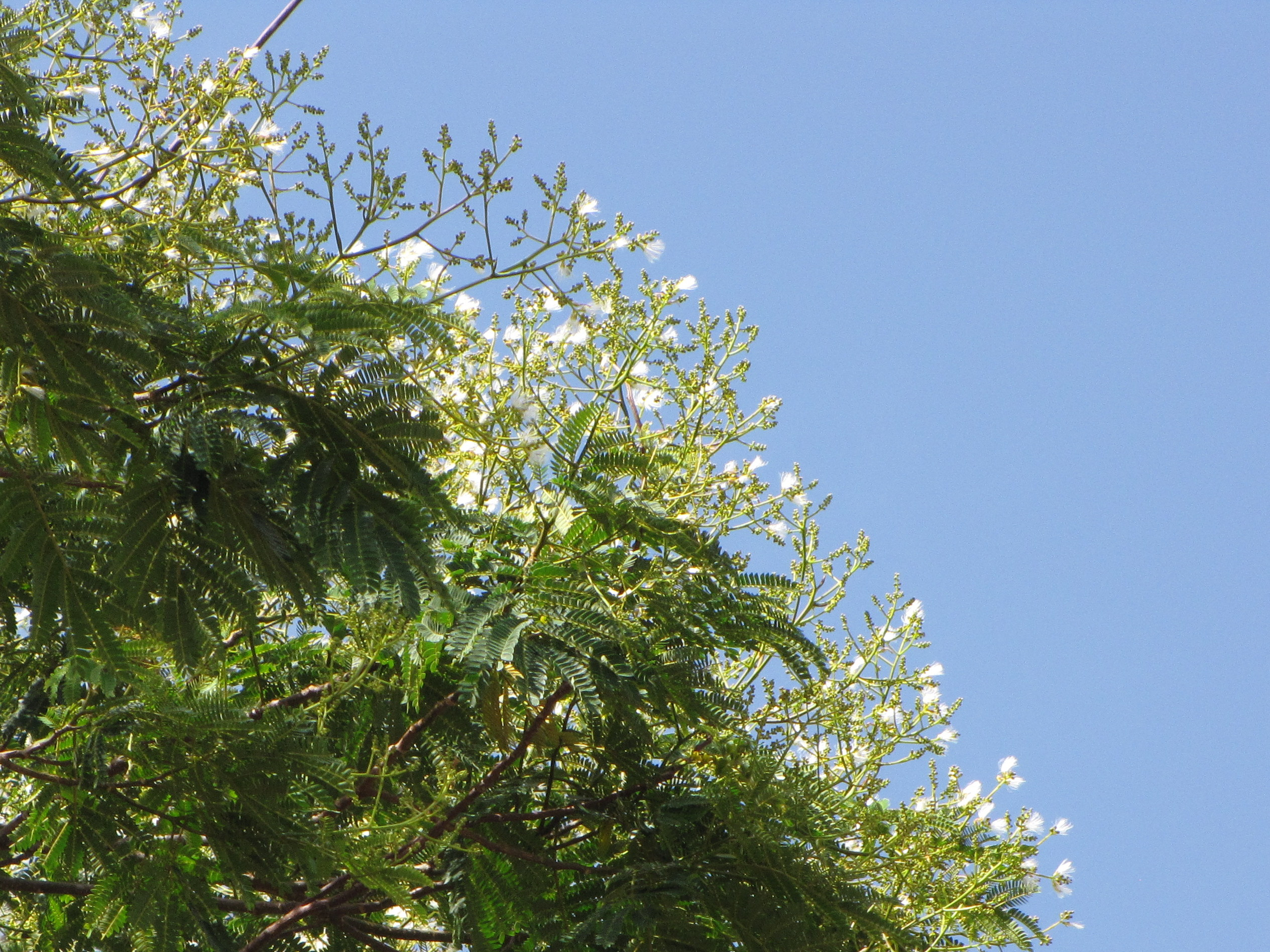
Flowers and leaves

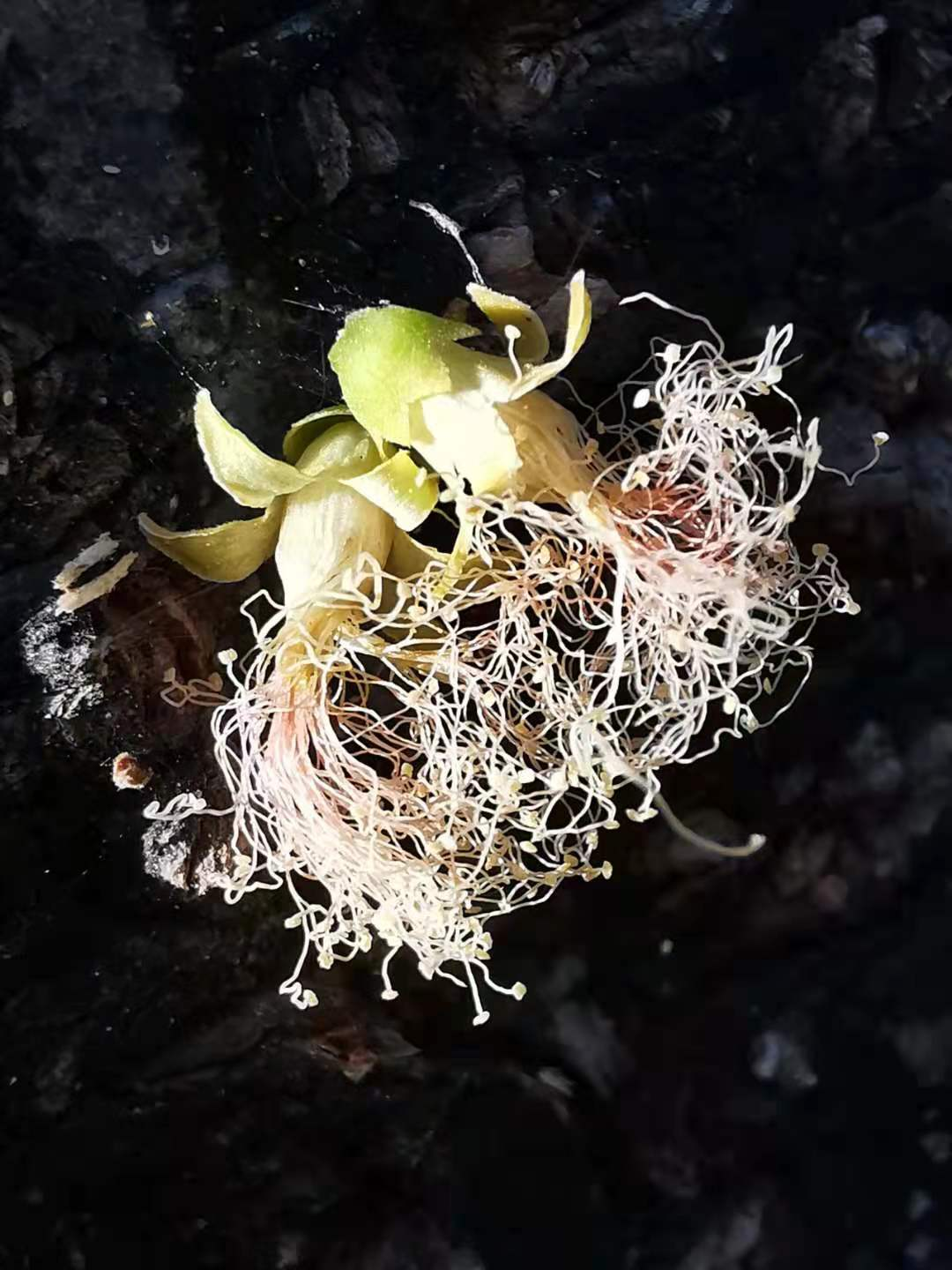
Small flowers falling on the root

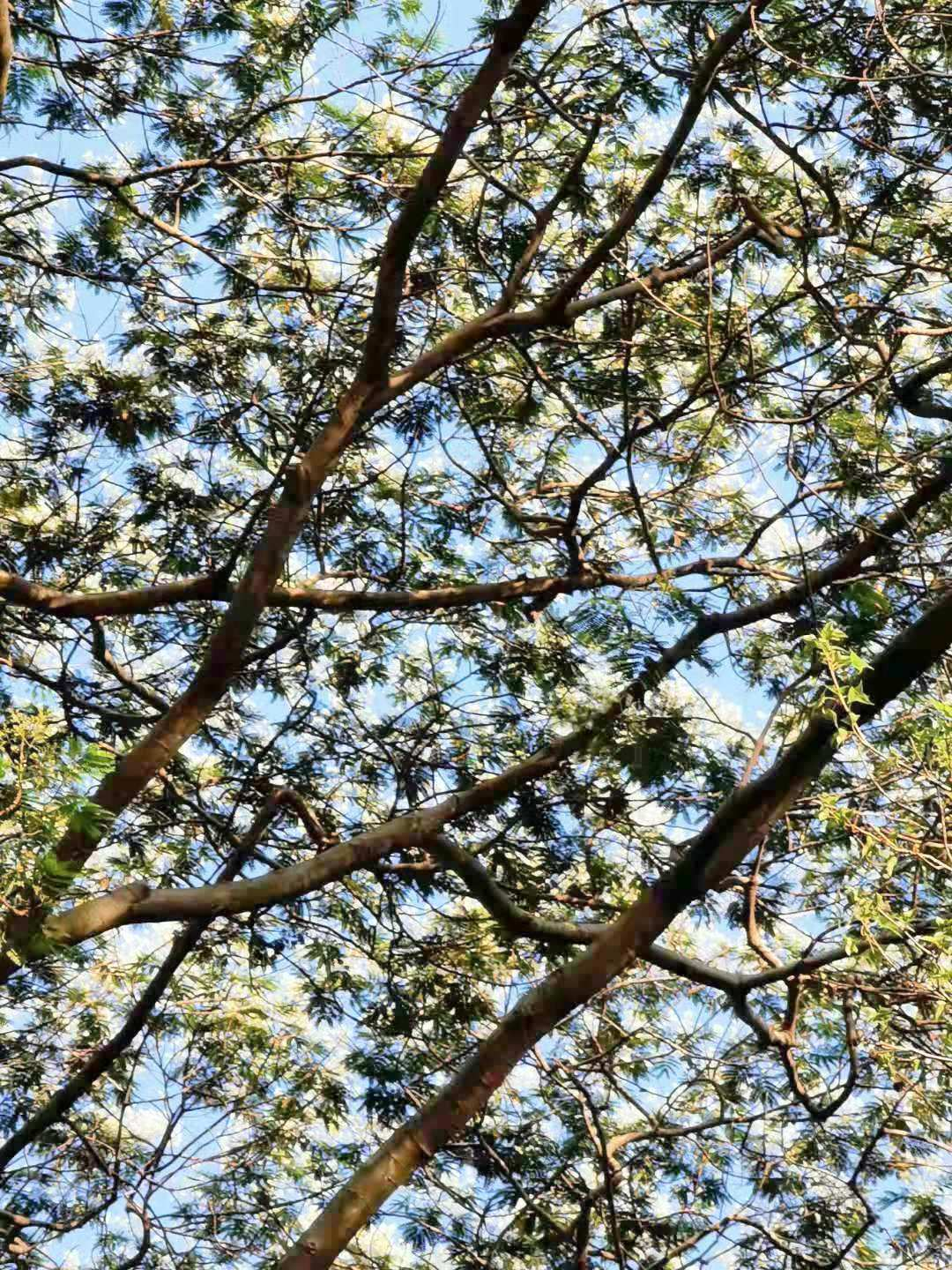
Flowers in full bloom

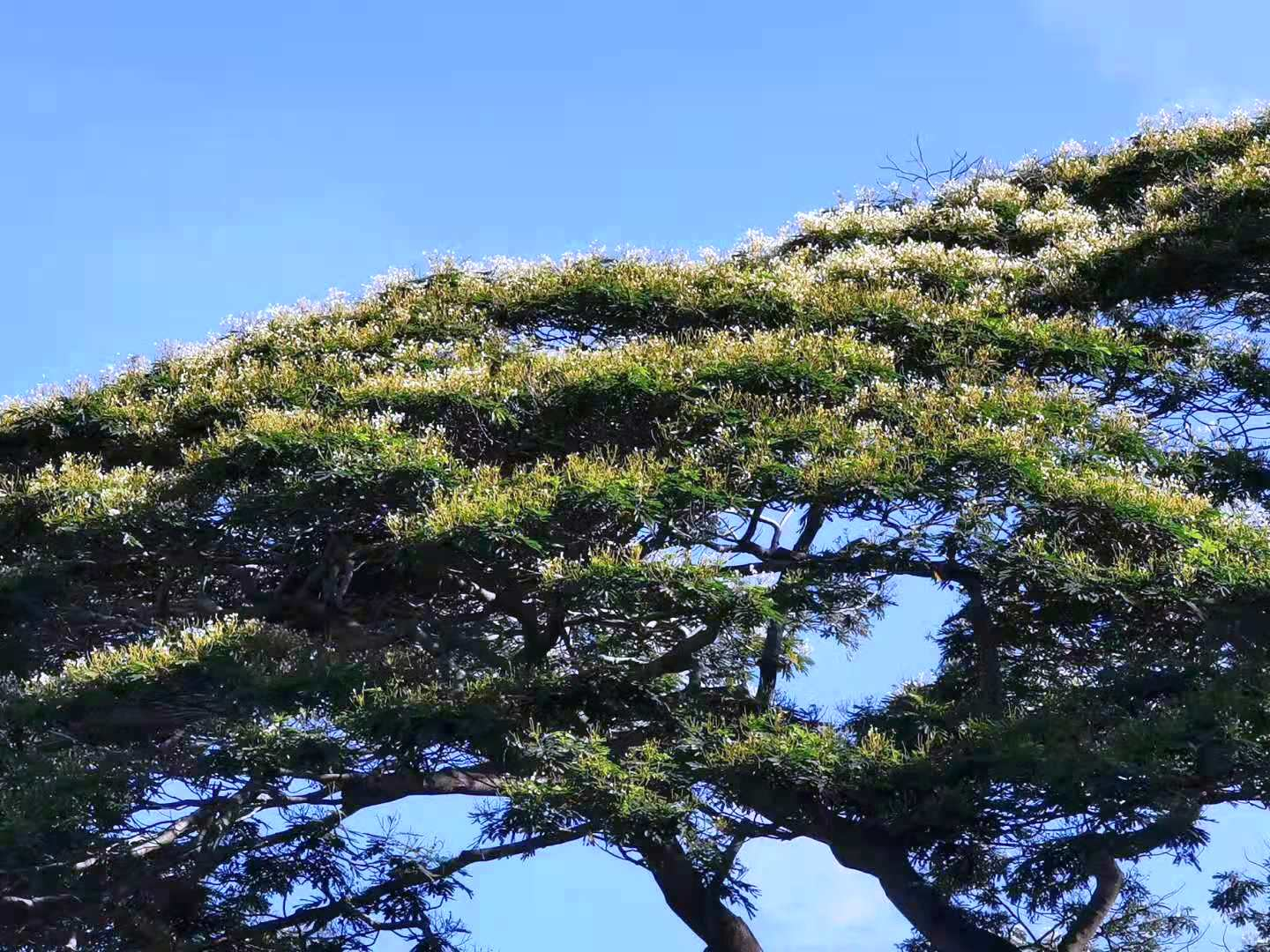
Flowers in full bloom

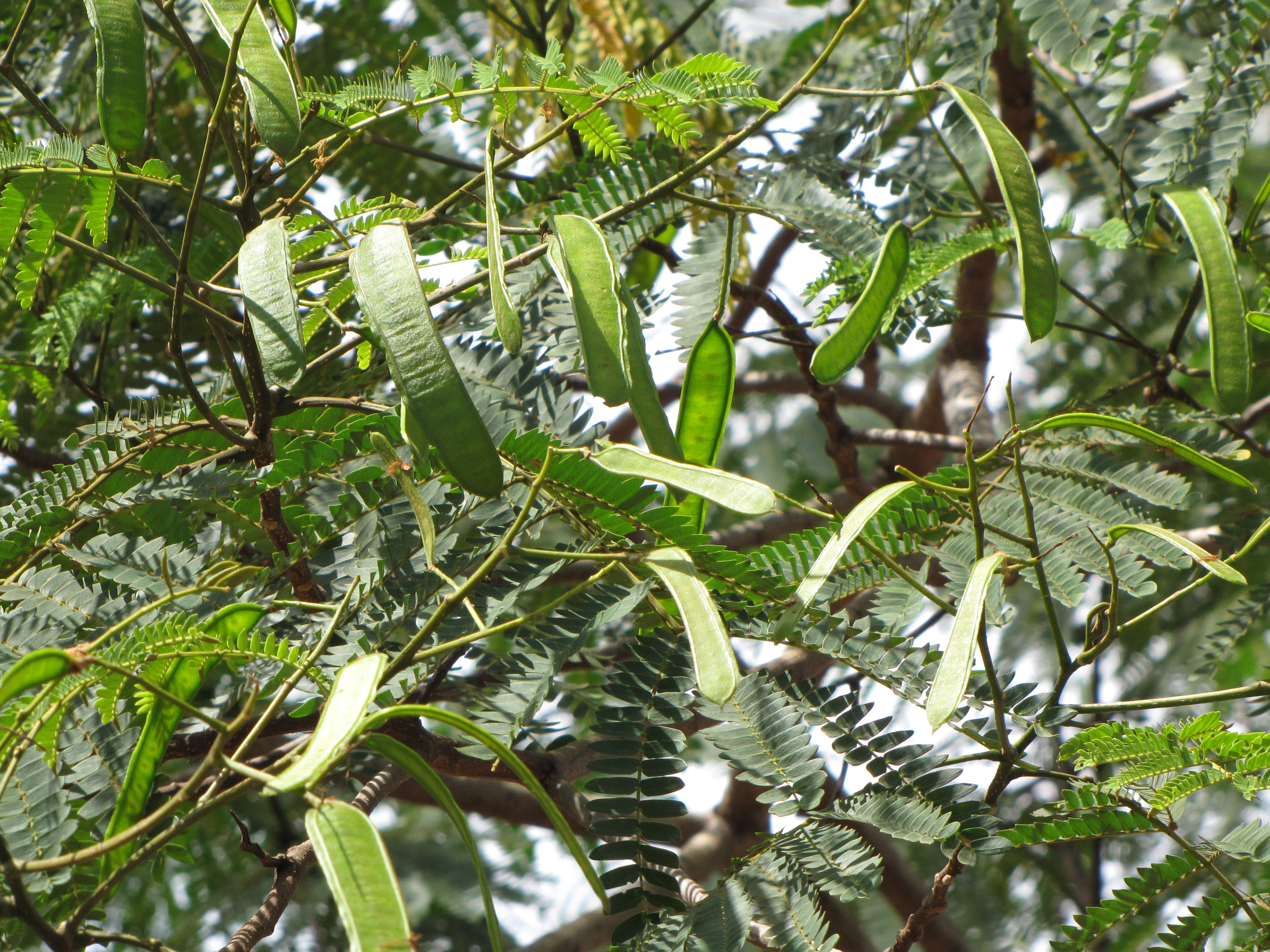
Immature seedpods

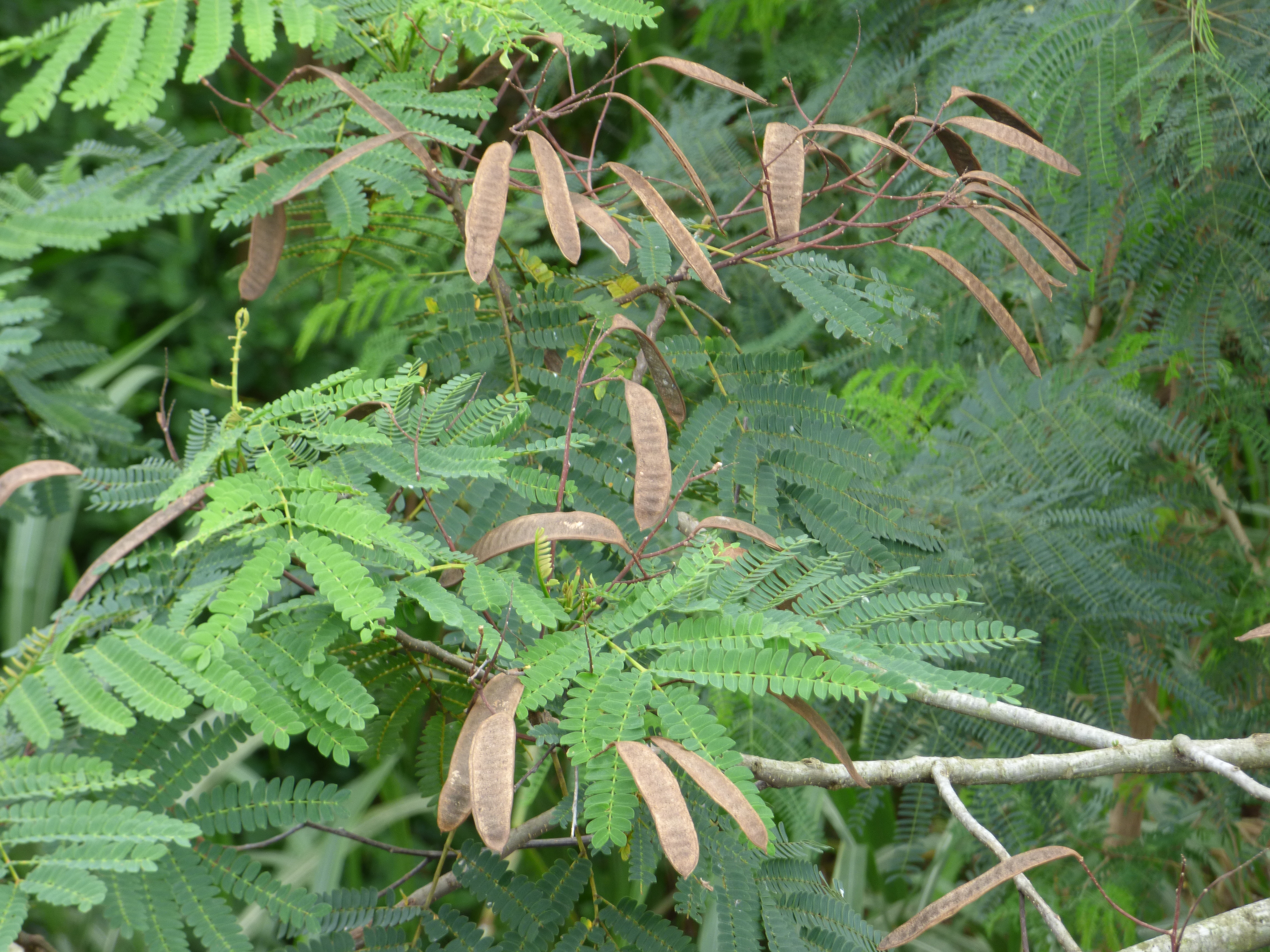
Mature seedpods

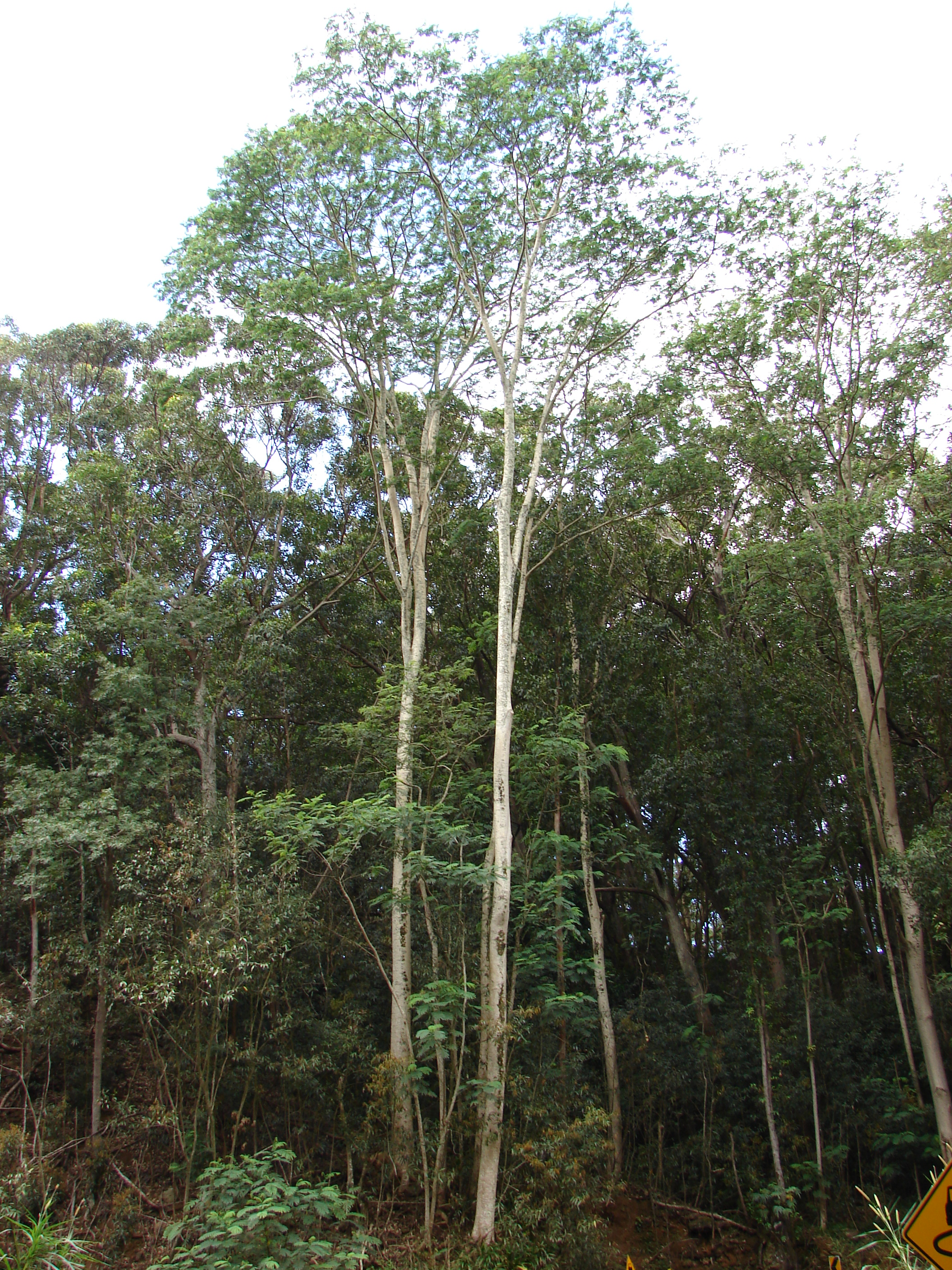
Trees in forest

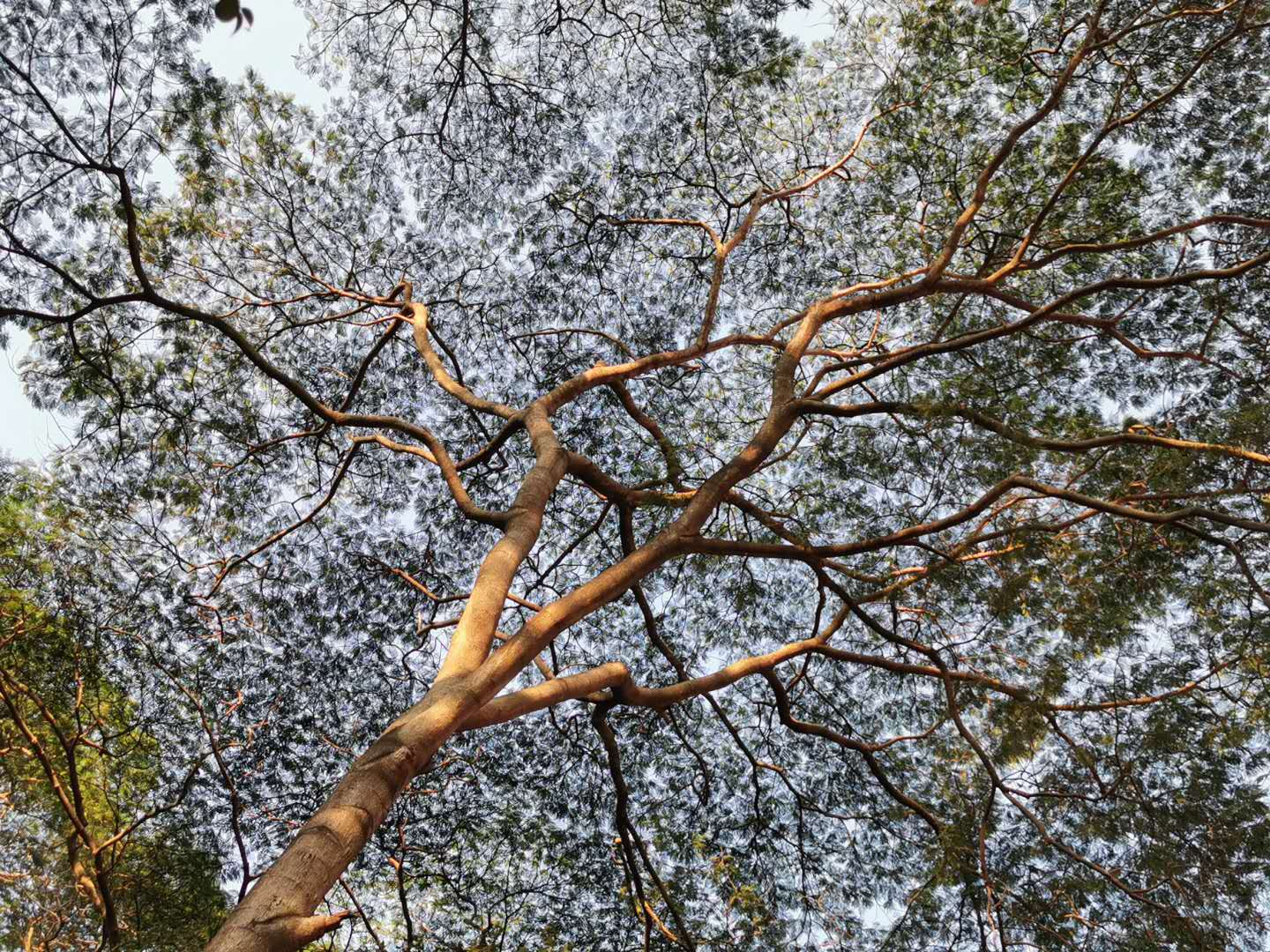
Tree crown
