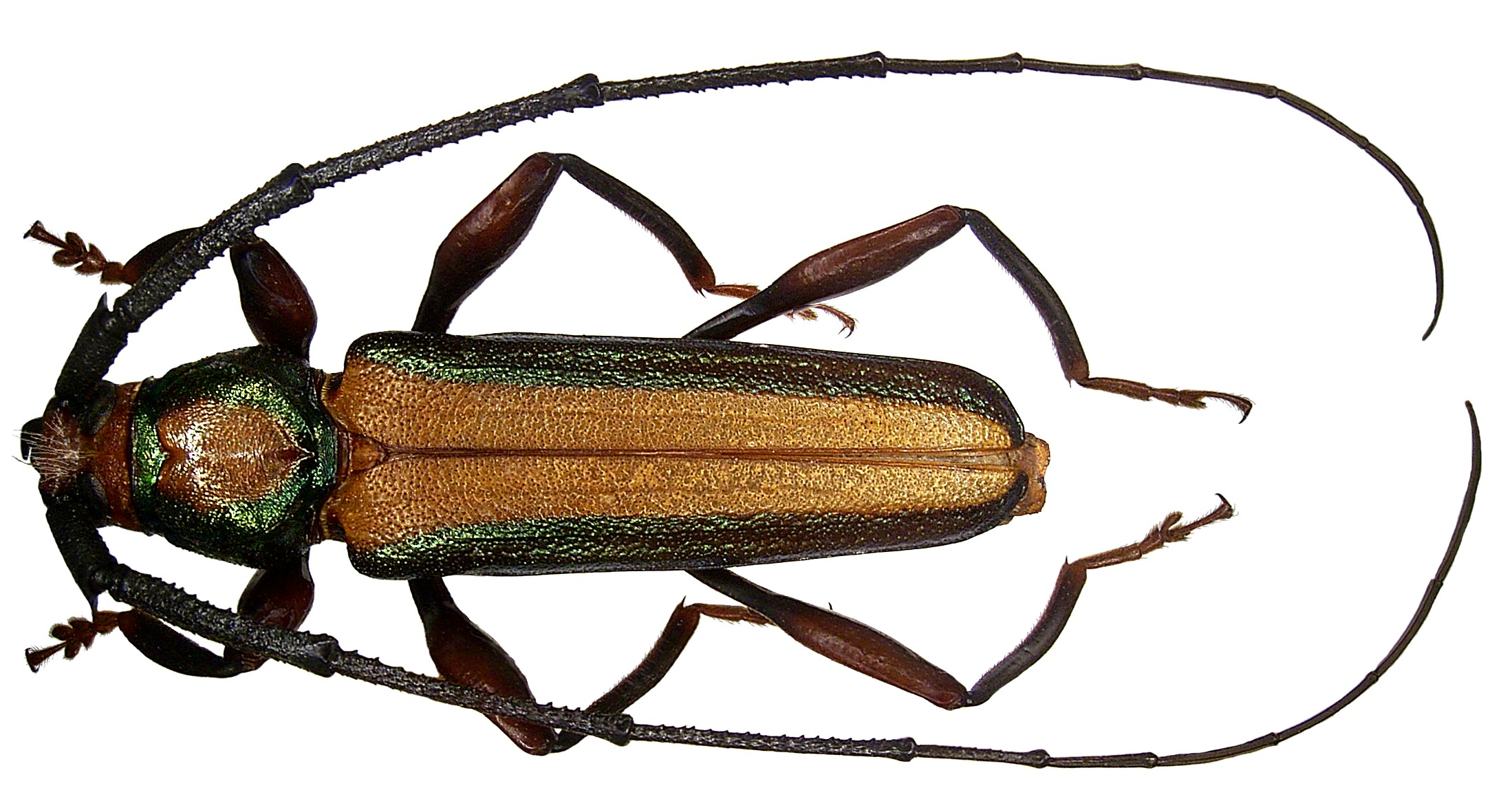

Scientific classification
- Kingdom: Animalia
- Phylum: Arthropoda
- Clade: Pancrustacea
- Class: Insecta
- Order: Coleoptera
- Suborder: Polyphaga
- Infraorder: Cucujiformia
- Family: Cerambycidae
- Genus: Xystrocera
- Species: X. festiva

Binomial name
- Xystrocera festiva Thomson, 1861

= Xystrocera festiva =

Species of beetle

Xystrocera festiva is a species of beetle in the family Cerambycidae. It was described by Thomson in 1861.
