= Erygia antecedens =

Scientific classification
- Kingdom: Animalia
- Phylum: Arthropoda
- Class: Insecta
- Order: Lepidoptera
- Superfamily: Noctuoidea
- Family: Erebidae
- Genus: Erygia
- Species: E. antecedens

Binomial name
- Erygia antecedens (Walker, [1858])

Synonyms
- Briarda antecedens Walker, [1858]; Felinia antecedens

Species of moth

Erygia antecedens is a moth of the family Erebidae. It is found on Peninsular Malaysia, Sumatra and Borneo. The habitat consists of lowland (dipterocarp) forests.
