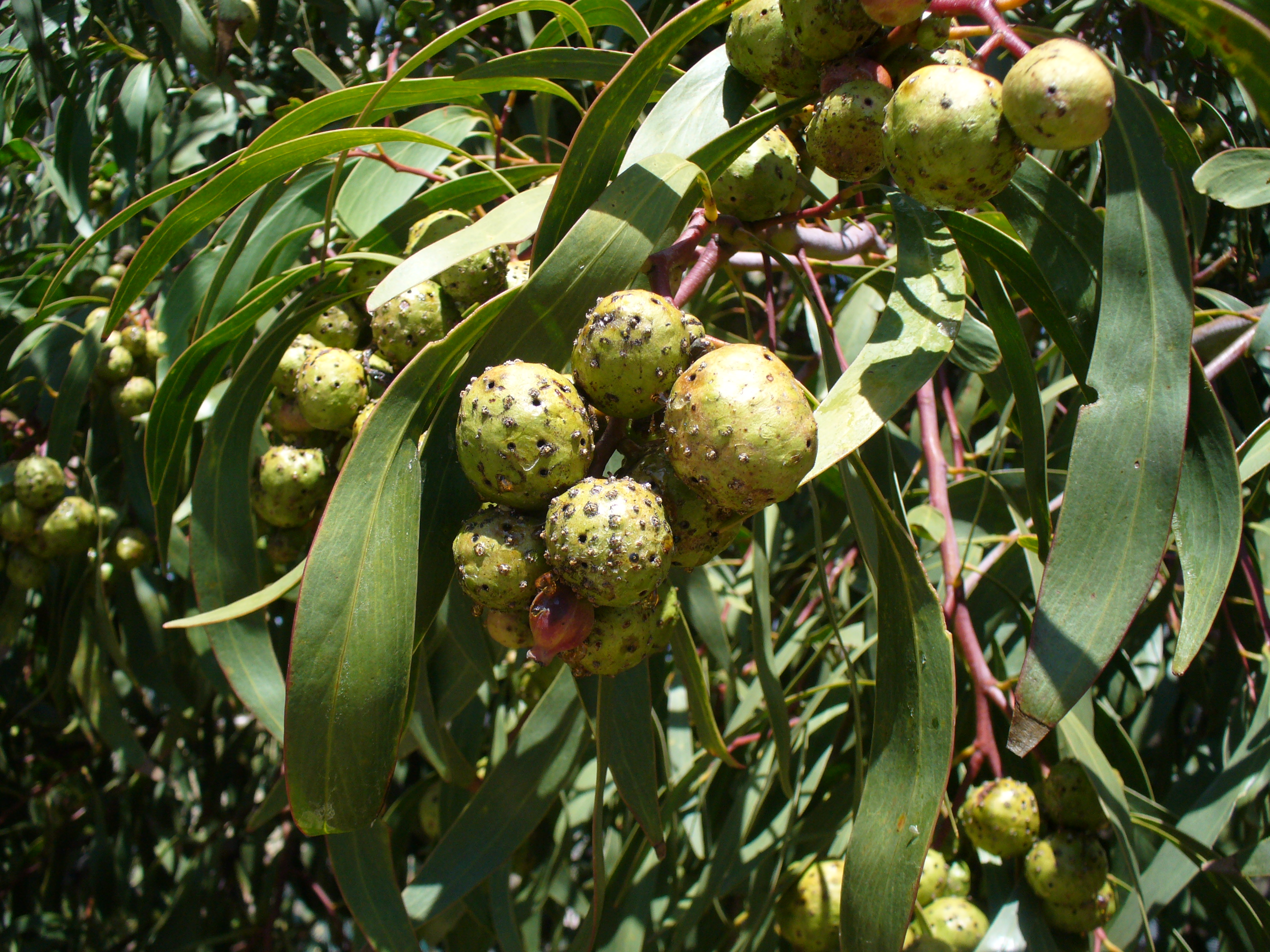
- Galls on acacia

Scientific classification
- Kingdom: Animalia
- Phylum: Arthropoda
- Class: Insecta
- Order: Hymenoptera
- Family: Melanosomellidae
- Genus: Trichilogaster
- Species: T. signiventris

Binomial name
- Trichilogaster signiventris (Girault)

Synonyms
- Perilampella signiventris Girault, 1931; Epiperilampus adolphi Girault, 1931; Coelocybelloides atraticorpus Girault, 1931

= Trichilogaster signiventris =

Species of wasp

Trichilogaster signiventris, commonly known as the golden wattle bud-galling wasp, is a species of Australian chalcid wasps that parasitises, among others, Acacia pycnantha (golden wattle). It has been introduced into South Africa, where the golden wattle has become an invasive pest.

American entomologist Alexandre Arsène Girault described the species as Perilampella signiventris in 1931.

The female is yellow and black in colour, though highly variable in colour proportion and pattern. It is 2.3–3.2 mm (23/256–1/8 in) long. The male is of similar size and almost entirely black with black and yellow legs.

The success of the related species Trichilogaster acaciaelongifoliae in managing Acacia longifolia led scientists to look for another species to control A. pycnantha. T. signiventris was introduced twice and at first thought a failure. Wasps from Lake Natimuk in Victoria were transported and released in Western Cape in 1987 and as no galls were seen the first summer, a second transfer — this time from Mount Compass, South Australia — was made in 1992 as scientists suspected the first cohort might have been incompatible with populations of golden wattle in Africa.

The host species are golden wattle (Acacia pycnantha) and Acacia rivalis. The eggs are laid by short-lived adult wasps into buds of flower heads in the summer, before hatching in May and June when the larvae induce the formation of the grape-like galls and prevent flower development. The galls can be so heavy that branches break under their weight. It has reduced the capacity of trees to reproduce throughout their range. It is possible that the galls also reduce the resilience of the host plants by absorbing nutrients and hence starving them. The galls are up to 3 centimetres (1 1/4 inches) in diameter and contain several grubs.
