= Abortive flower =

Flower that has a stamen but an under developed, or no pistil

Abortion in flowers and developing fruits is a common occurrence in plants.

An abortive flower is one that possesses stamens but has an underdeveloped or absent pistil, preventing it from developing into fruit. This phenomenon can occur naturally due to developmental, genetic, or environmental factors. Abortive flowers are often sterile or non-functional in reproduction, though they may still play ecological roles.

Sexual reproduction in flowering plants typically requires both male (stamens) and female (pistils) organs, though many species produce unisexual flowers or rely on cross-pollination. When the pistil fails to develop properly, pollination cannot lead to fertilization, resulting in reproductive failure and fruit abortion. Studies have also shown that hermaphroditic or bisexual flowers tend to exhibit higher rates of fruit abortion compared to unisexual flowers, possibly due to resource allocation conflicts or selective fertilization pressures.

Illustrative examples include species affected by Trichilogaster acaciaelongifoliae, a gall-forming wasp that causes extensive floral abortion in invasive Australian wattles.

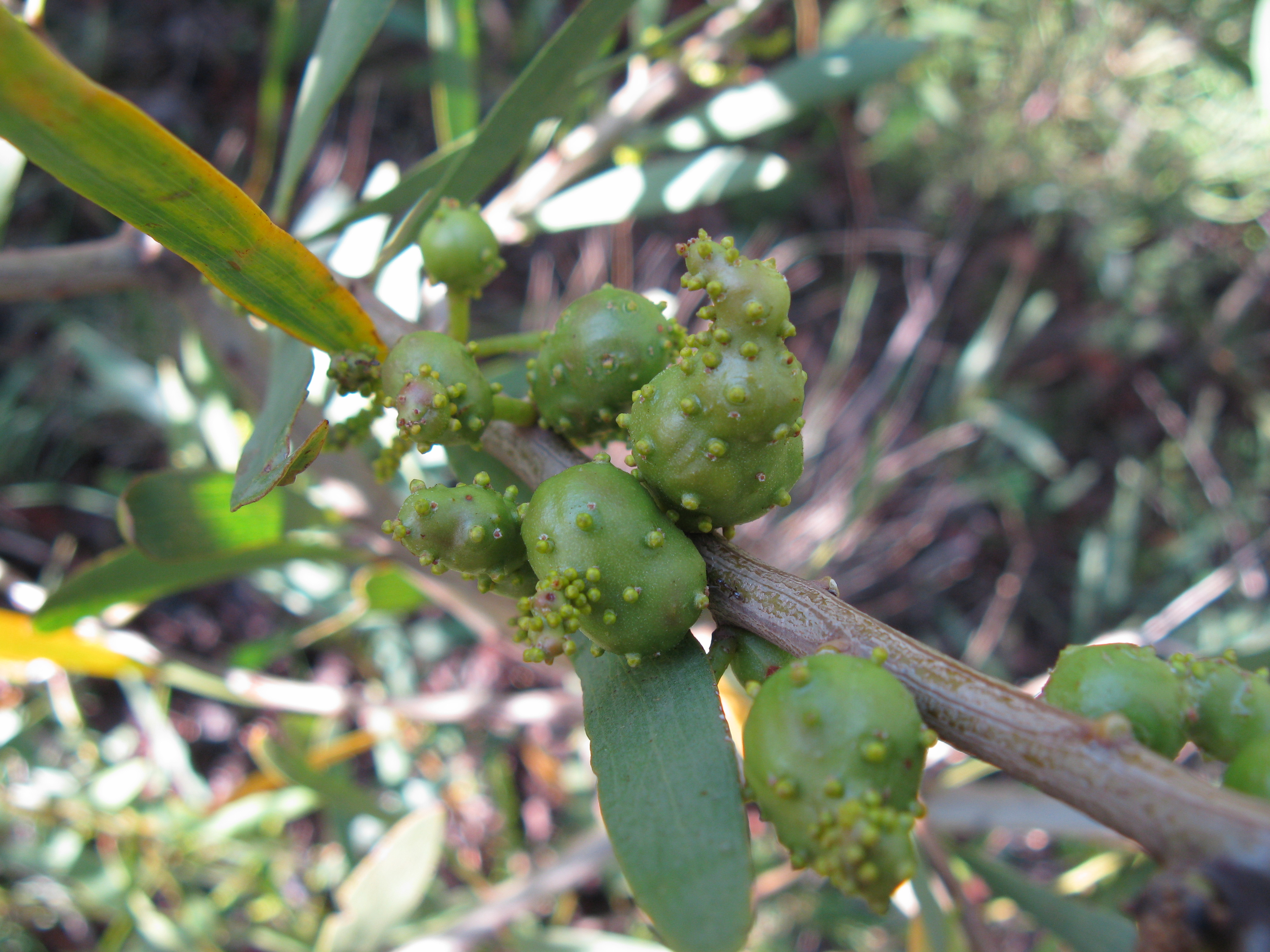
Galls of Trichilogaster acaciaelongifoliae

== Causes of fruit & flower abortion ==
Flower abortion may occur due to one or more of the following causes:

- Resource limitations: When resources like water, nitrogen, or phosphorus are limited, plants may abort flowers or young fruits to conserve energy for survival or to support fewer but more viable offspring.
- Pollination failure: Flowers that fail to receive adequate or compatible pollen often abort prior to fruit set.
- Genetic or hormonal regulation: Some species naturally produce excess flowers, only a subset of which develop into fruits. Hormones such as auxins and cytokinins play key roles in this selective abortion.
- Environmental stress: Extreme heat, drought, or other abiotic stressors can induce flower or fruit abortion.
- Pest and pathogen activity: Certain insects and pathogens can disrupt flower developments, either directly (through damage) or indirectly (by manipulating plant hormones).
- Sexual expression: In dioecious or subdioecious plants, individuals may bear non-functional or abortive flowers of the opposite sex or hermaphroditic flowers with aborted pistils.

== Notable examples of abortion in plants ==
Several plant species or associated organisms exhibit noteworthy patterns of flower or fruit abortion:

- Aucuba japonica (Japanese laurel): Commonly displays male flowers with fully developed stamens and abortive female parts. Many cultivated varieties are male and require a female plant for berry production.
- Urginea nagarjunae: A rare species in India, it exhibits flower abortion patterns likely tied to ecological stress or reproductive strategy.
- Trichilogaster acaciaelongifoliae: This wasp parasitizes Acacia longifolia flowers, inducing galls that cause complete abortion of reproductive structures, aiding in biological control of this invasive species.
- Subdioecy in plants: Many species like Silene acaulis and Hebe subalpina exhibit intermediate sexual systems where abortive floral organs play a role in sex expression and evolution.

== See also ==
- Flower
- Stamen
- Pistil
- Plant reproductive morphology
