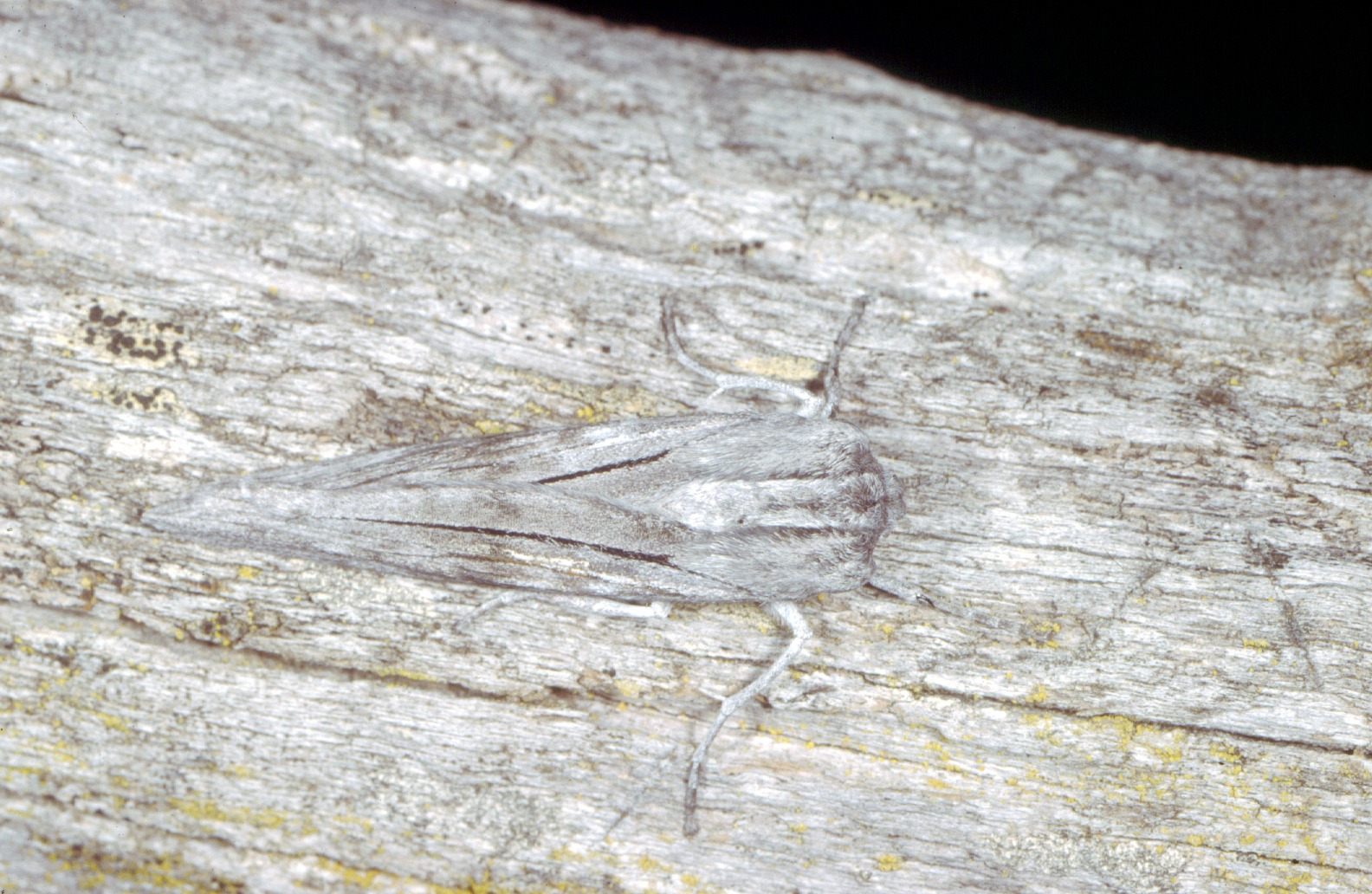
- Adult
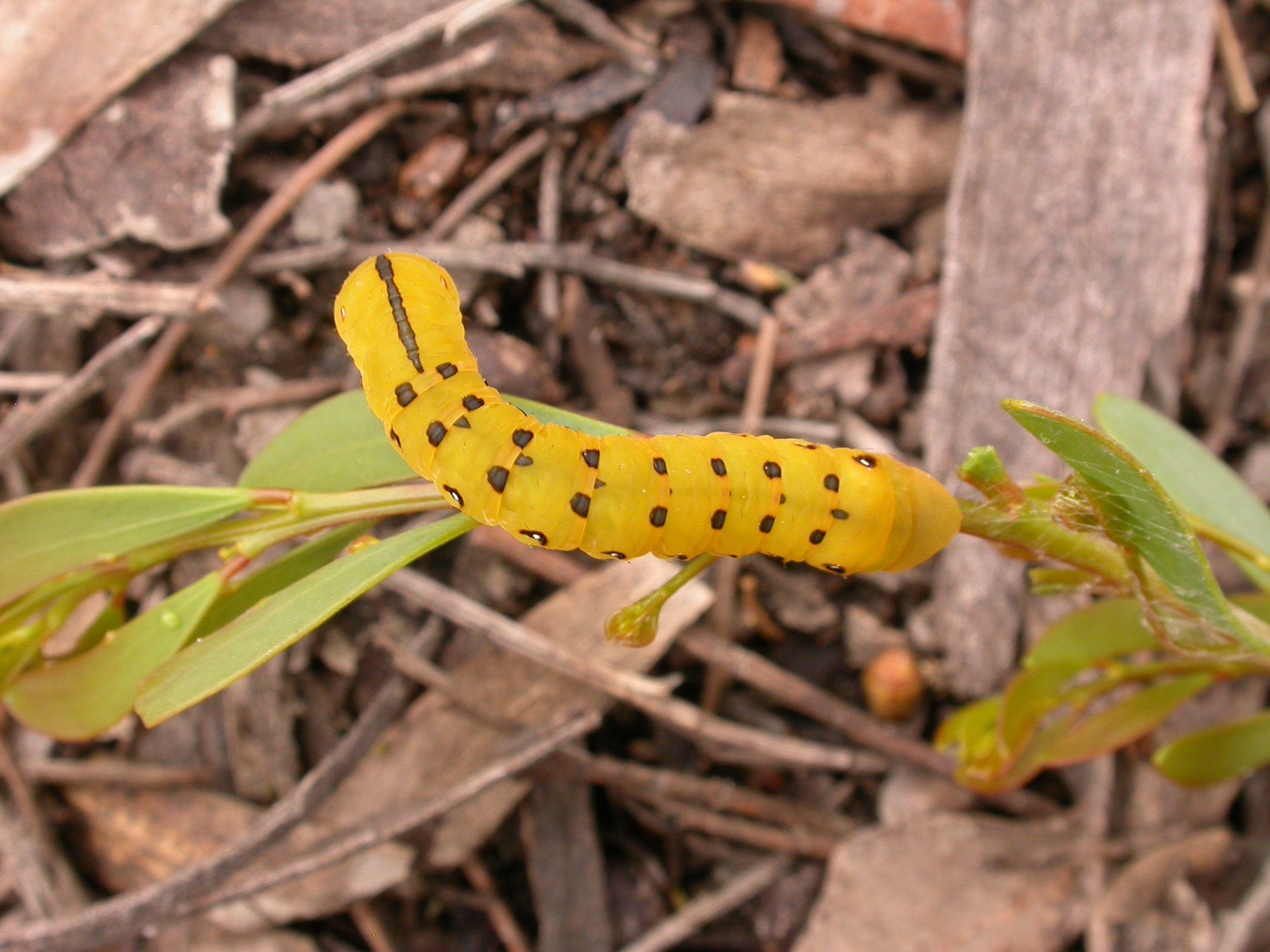
- Larva

Scientific classification
- Kingdom: Animalia
- Phylum: Arthropoda
- Clade: Pancrustacea
- Class: Insecta
- Order: Lepidoptera
- Family: Geometridae
- Genus: Capusa
- Species: C. cuculloides

Binomial name
- Capusa cuculloides (R. Felder, 1874)

Synonyms
- Teinocladia cuculloides R. Felder, 1874

= Capusa cuculloides =

Species of moth

Capusa cuculloides, the white-winged wedge-moth, is a moth of the family Geometridae. It was described by Rudolf Felder in 1874. It is known from Australia, including Tasmania.

The larvae feed on golden wattle Acacia pycnantha and peppermint box Eucalyptus odorata.
