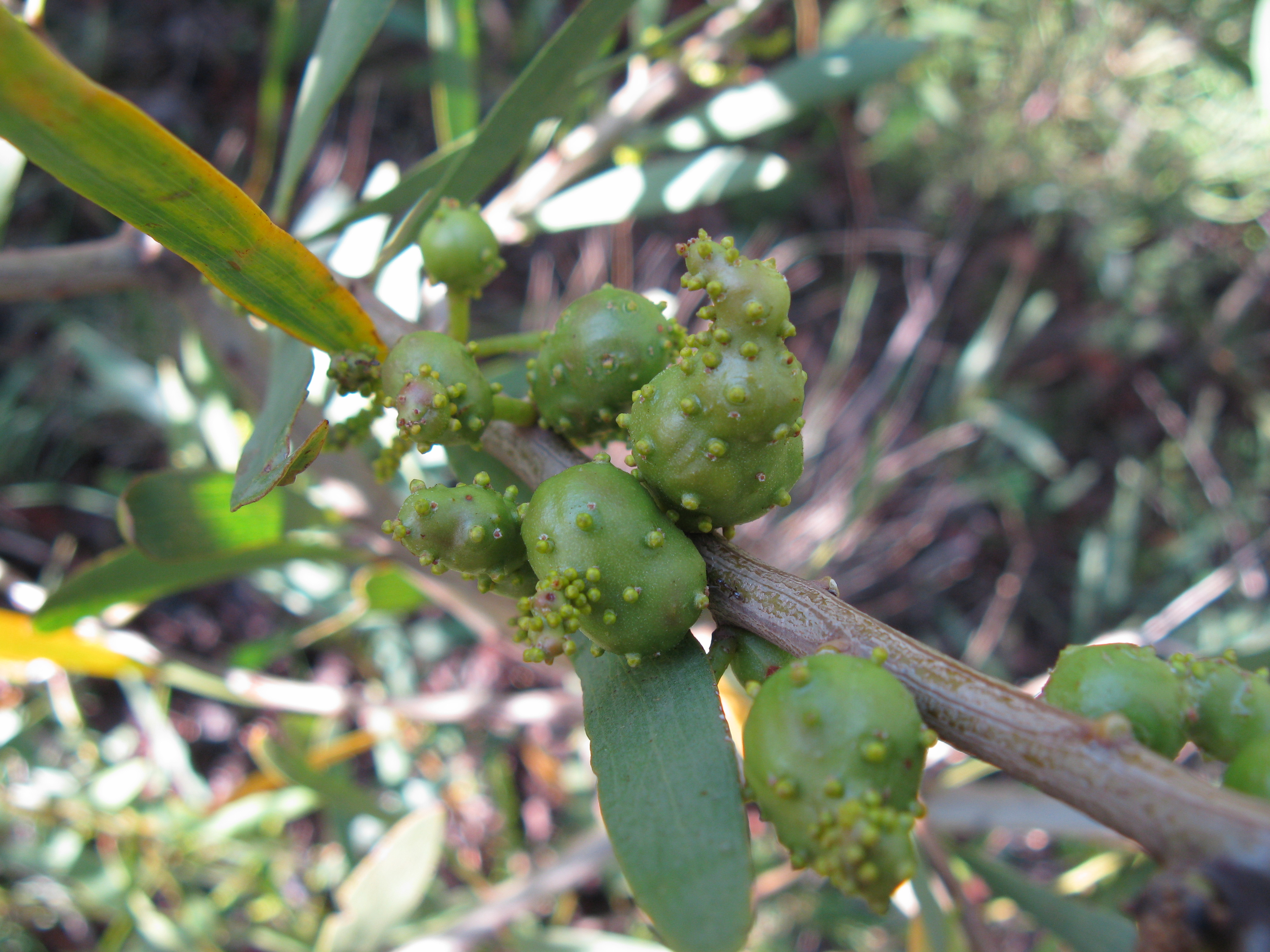
- Galls of T. acaciaelongifoliae on Acacia longifolia

Scientific classification
- Kingdom: Animalia
- Phylum: Arthropoda
- Clade: Pancrustacea
- Class: Insecta
- Order: Hymenoptera
- Family: Melanosomellidae
- Subfamily: Melanosomellinae
- Tribe: Melanosomellini
- Genus: Trichilogaster; Mayr, 1905

Synonyms
- Epiperilampus Girault, 1913

= Trichilogaster =

Genus of wasps

Trichilogaster is a small genus of chalcid wasps in the family Melanosomellidae, previously they were included in family Pteromalidae subfamily Ormocerinae. With one described exception, they all are Australian species that are gall-formers on Australian species of Acacia. The exception is an Arabian species. Apart from its ecological interest, the genus is of practical importance because some of its members are successful biocontrol agents in South Africa at least, where T. acaciaelongifoliae and T. signiventris have been established successfully to control invasive Australian Acacia species, notably Acacia longifolia and Acacia pycnantha.

== Species ==
The species most recently recognised in a revision of the genus are:

- Trichilogaster acaciaelongifoliae (Froggatt, 1892)
- Trichilogaster arabica Ferrière, 1947
- Trichilogaster channingi (Girault, 1913)
- Trichilogaster esculenta Ferrière, 1947
- Trichilogaster flavivena (Girault, 1931)
- Trichilogaster maideni (Froggatt, 1892)
- Trichilogaster olgae Prinsloo & Neser, 2007
- Trichilogaster pendulae Mayr, 1905
- Trichilogaster signiventris (Girault, 1931)
- Trichilogaster stefani Prinsloo & Neser, 2007

"Epiperilampus atra", "Epiperilampus atricorpus" and "Epiperilampus significatus" are now regarded as synonyms of Trichilogaster maideni. In the review, 13 species of documented host plants were listed, comprising one Paraserianthes and 12 Acacia species.
