= Silver wattle =

Silver wattle is the common name of several plant species:

- Acacia sclerosperma
- Acacia dealbata
- Acacia lasiocalyx
- Acacia retinodes
- Acacia rivalis
