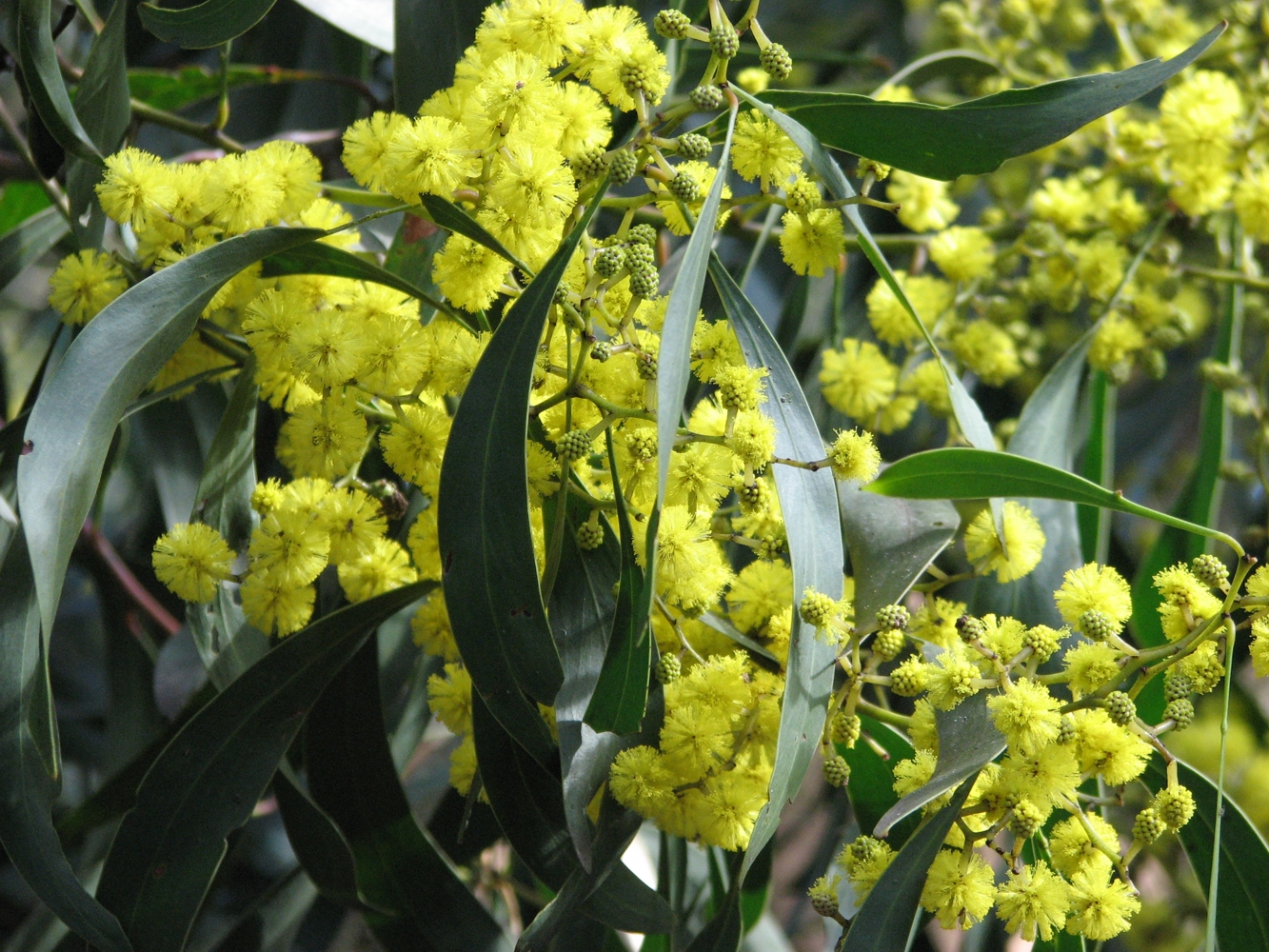

Conservation status
- Least Concern (IUCN 3.1)

Scientific classification
- Kingdom: Plantae
- Clade: Tracheophytes
- Clade: Angiosperms
- Clade: Eudicots
- Clade: Rosids
- Order: Fabales
- Family: Fabaceae
- Subfamily: Caesalpinioideae
- Clade: Mimosoid clade
- Genus: Acacia
- Species: A. pycnantha

Binomial name
- Acacia pycnantha Benth.
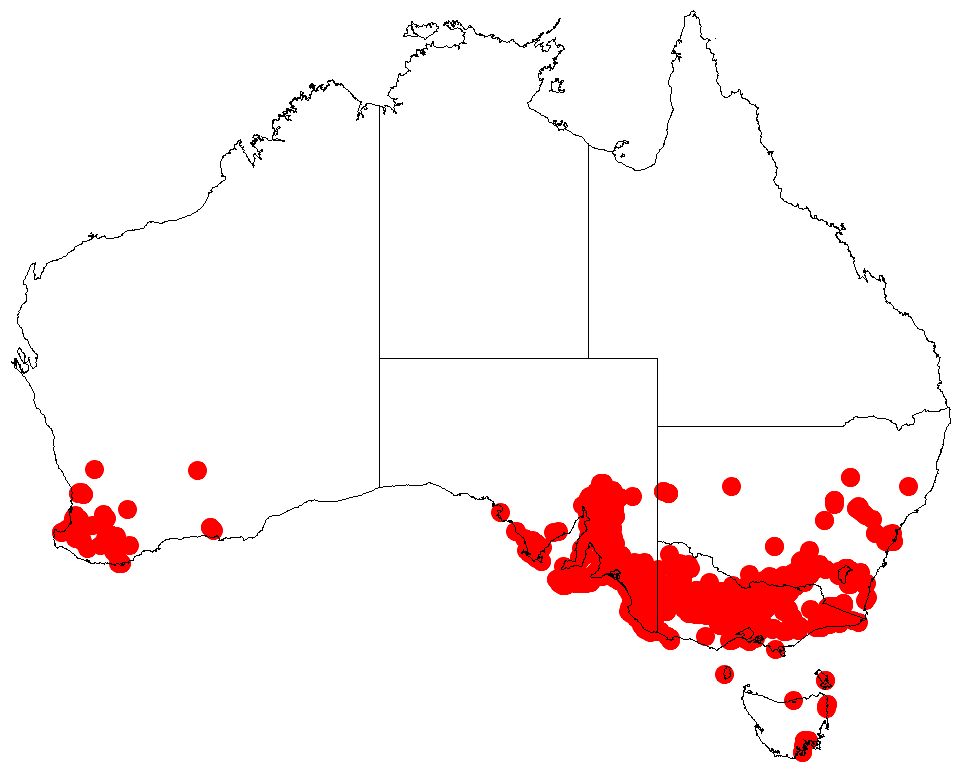
- Occurrence data from AVH

Synonyms
- Species synonymy: Acacia falcinella Meisn.; Acacia petiolaris Lehm.; Acacia pycnantha var. petiolaris H.Vilm.; Acacia pycnantha Benth. var. pycnantha; Acacia westonii Maiden; Racosperma pycnanthum (Benth.) Pedley

= Acacia pycnantha =

Golden wattle

Golden wattle of southeastern Australia

Acacia pycnantha, most commonly known as the golden wattle, is a tree of the family Fabaceae. It grows to a height of 8 metres (26 feet) and has phyllodes (flattened leaf stalks) instead of true leaves. The profuse fragrant, golden flowers appear in late winter and spring, followed by long seed pods. Explorer Thomas Mitchell collected the type specimen, from which George Bentham wrote the species description in 1842. The species is native to southeastern Australia as an understorey plant in eucalyptus forest. Plants are cross-pollinated by several species of honeyeater and thornbill, which visit nectaries on the phyllodes and brush against flowers, transferring pollen between them.

A. pycnantha has become a weed in areas of Australia, as well as in Africa and Eurasia. Its bark produces more tannin than any other wattle species, resulting in its commercial cultivation for production of this compound. It has been widely grown as an ornamental garden plant and for cut flower production. A. pycnantha was made the official floral emblem of Australia in 1988, and has been featured on the country's postal stamps.

== Description ==
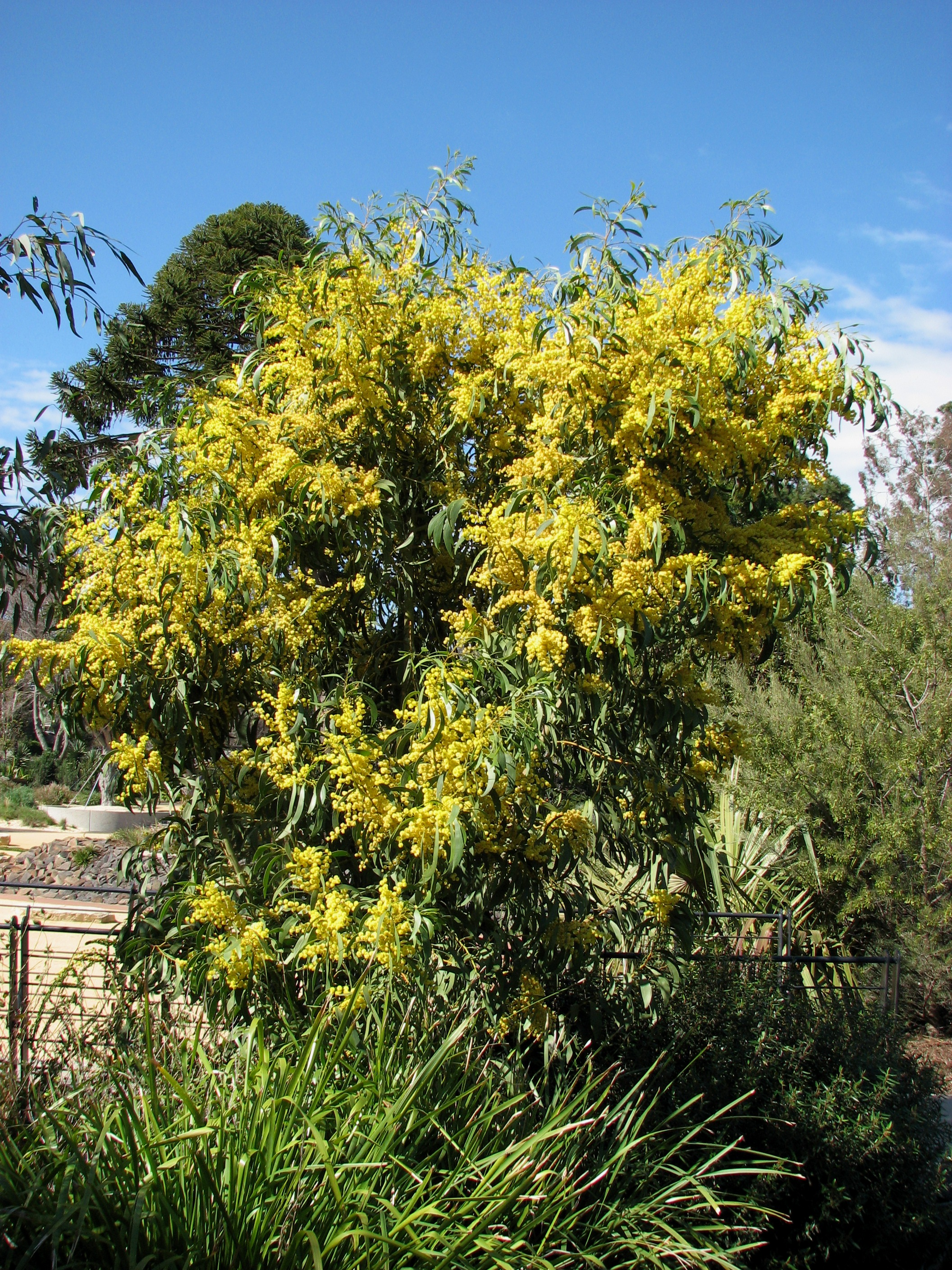
Habit, Geelong Botanic Gardens

Acacia pycnantha generally grows as a small tree to between 3 and 8 metres (10 and 30 feet) in height, though trees of up to 12 m (40 ft) high have been reported in Morocco. The bark is generally dark brown to grey—smooth in younger plants though it can be furrowed and rough in older plants. Branchlets may be bare and smooth or covered with a white bloom. The mature trees do not have true leaves but have phyllodes—flat and widened leaf stems—that hang down from the branches. Shiny and dark green, these are between 9 and 15 cm (3.5 and 5.9 in) long, 1–3.5 cm (0.4–1 in) wide and falcate (sickle-shaped) to oblanceolate in shape. New growth has a bronze colouration. Field observations at Hale Conservation Park show the bulk of new growth occurs over spring and summer from October to January.

Floral buds are produced year-round on the tips of new growth, but only those initiated between November and May go on to flower several months later. Flowering usually takes place from July to November (late winter to early summer) in the golden wattle's native range, and because the later buds develop faster, flowering peaks over July and August. The bright yellow inflorescences occur in groups of 40 to 80 on 2.5–9 cm (1–4 in)-long racemes that arise from axillary buds. Each inflorescence is a ball-like structure covered by 40 to 100 small flowers that have five tiny petals (pentamerous) and long erect stamens, which give the flower head a fluffy appearance.

Developing after flowering has finished, the seed pods are flattish, straight or slightly curved, 5–14 cm (2–6 in) long and 5–8 mm wide. They are initially bright green, maturing to dark brown and have slight constrictions between the seeds, which are arranged in a line in the pod. The oblong seeds themselves are 5.5 to 6 mm long, black and shiny, with a clavate (club-shaped) aril. They are released in December and January, when the pods are fully ripe.

=== Similar species ===
Species similar in appearance include mountain hickory wattle (A. obliquinervia), coast golden wattle (A. leiophylla) and golden wreath wattle (A. saligna). Acacia obliquinervia has grey-green phyllodes, fewer flowers in its flower heads, and broader (1.25–2.5 cm (0.5–1 in)-wide) seed pods. A. leiophylla has paler phyllodes. A. saligna has longer, narrower phyllodes.

== Taxonomy ==
Acacia pycnantha was first formally described by botanist George Bentham in the London Journal of Botany in 1842. The type specimen was collected by the explorer Thomas Mitchell in present-day northern Victoria between Pyramid Hill and the Loddon River. Bentham thought it was related to A. leiophylla, which he described in the same paper. The specific epithet pycnantha is derived from the Greek words pyknos (dense) and anthos (flower), a reference to the dense cluster of flowers that make up the globular inflorescences. Queensland botanist Les Pedley reclassified the species as Racosperma pycnanthum in 2003, when he proposed placing almost all Australian members of the genus into the new genus Racosperma. However, this name is treated as a synonym of its original name.

Johann Georg Christian Lehmann described Acacia petiolaris in 1851 from a plant grown at Hamburg Botanic Gardens from seed said to be from the Swan River Colony (Perth). Carl Meissner described A. falcinella from material from Port Lincoln in 1855. Bentham classified both as A. pycnantha in his 1864 Flora Australiensis, though he did categorise a possible subspecies angustifolia based on material from Spencer Gulf with narrower phyllodes and fewer inflorescences. However, no subspecies are currently recognised, though an informal classification distinguishes wetland and dryland forms, the latter with narrower phyllodes.

In 1921 Joseph Maiden described Acacia westonii from the northern and western slopes of Mount Jerrabomberra near Queanbeyan in New South Wales. He felt it was similar to, but distinct from, A. pycnantha and was uncertain whether it warranted species rank. His colleague Richard Hind Cambage grew seedlings and reported they had much longer internodes than those of A. pycnantha, and that the phyllodes appeared to have three nectaries rather than the single one of the latter species. It is now regarded as a synonym of A. pycnantha.

Common names recorded include golden wattle, green wattle, black wattle, and broad-leaved wattle. At Ebenezer Mission in the Wergaia country of north-western Victoria the Aboriginal people referred to it as witch.

Hybrids of the species are known in nature and cultivation. In the Whipstick forest near Bendigo in Victoria, putative hybrids with Whirrakee wattle (Acacia williamsonii) have been identified; these resemble hakea wattle (Acacia hakeoides). Garden hybrids with Queensland silver wattle (Acacia podalyriifolia) raised in Europe have been given the names Acacia x siebertiana and Acacia x deneufvillei.

== Distribution and habitat ==
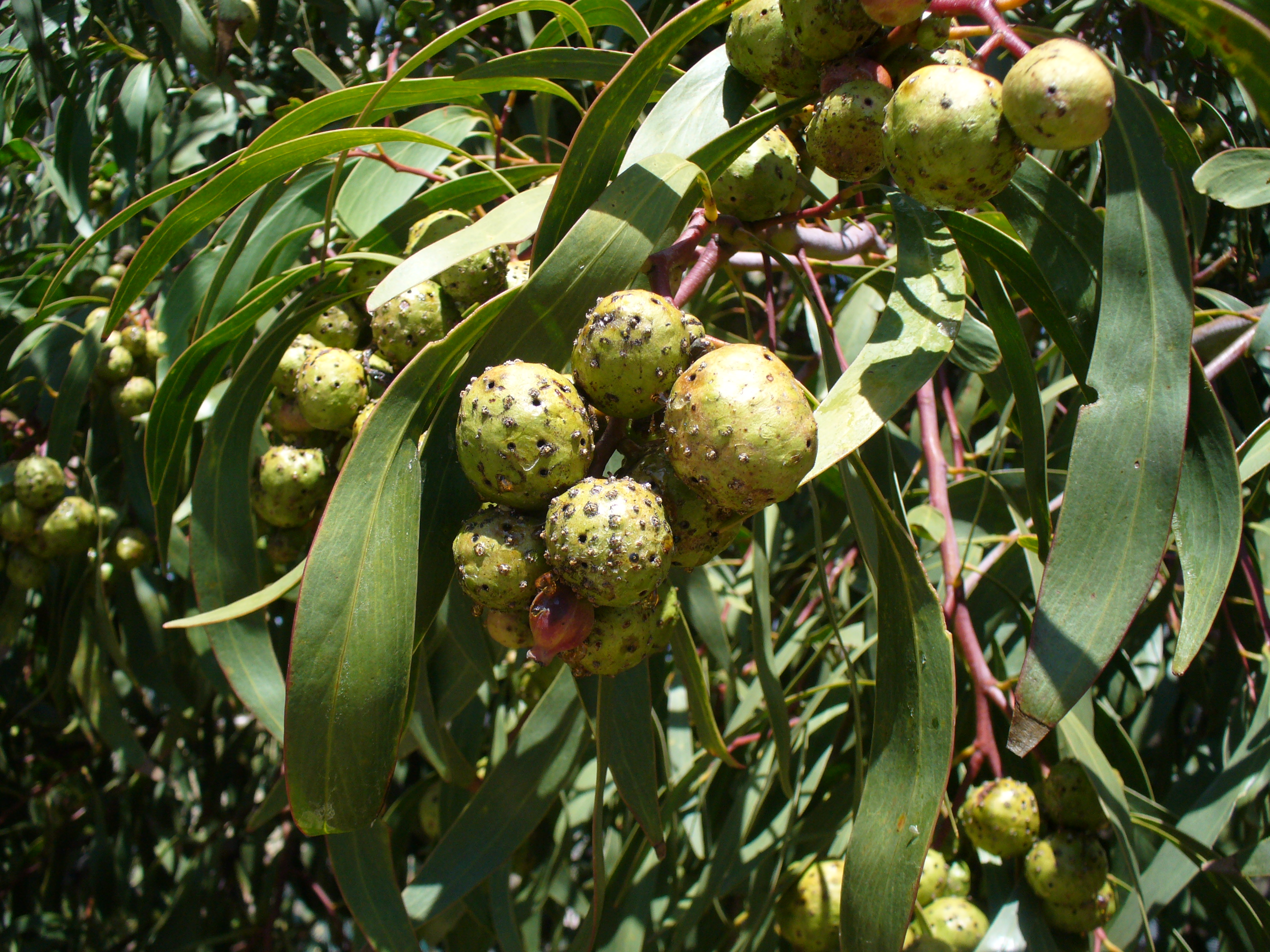
Galls formed by Trichilogaster signiventris wasps on a plant in South Africa

Golden wattle occurs in south-eastern Australia from South Australia's southern Eyre Peninsula and Flinders Ranges across Victoria and northwards into inland areas of southern New South Wales and the Australian Capital Territory. It is found in the understorey of open eucalypt forests on dry, shallow soils.

The species has become naturalised beyond its original range in Australia. In New South Wales it is especially prevalent around Sydney and the Central Coast region. In Tasmania it has spread in the east of the state and become weedy in bushland near Hobart. In Western Australia, it is found in the Darling Range and western wheatbelt as well as Esperance and Kalgoorlie.

Outside Australia it has become naturalised in South Africa where it is considered an invasive alien plant and is uprooted to prevent water depletion and protect local flora, Tanzania, Italy, Portugal, Sardinia, India, Indonesia and New Zealand. It is present in California as a garden escapee, but is not considered to be naturalised there. In South Africa, where it had been introduced between 1858 and 1865 for dune stabilization and tannin production, it had spread along waterways into forest, mountain and lowland fynbos, and borderline areas between fynbos and karoo. The gall-forming wasp Trichilogaster signiventris has been introduced in South Africa for biological control and has reduced the capacity of trees to reproduce throughout their range. The eggs are laid by adult wasps into buds of flower heads in the summer, before hatching in May and June when the larvae induce the formation of the grape-like galls and prevent flower development. The galls can be so heavy that branches break under their weight. In addition, the introduction in 2001 of the acacia seed weevil Melanterius compactus has also proved effective.

== Ecology ==
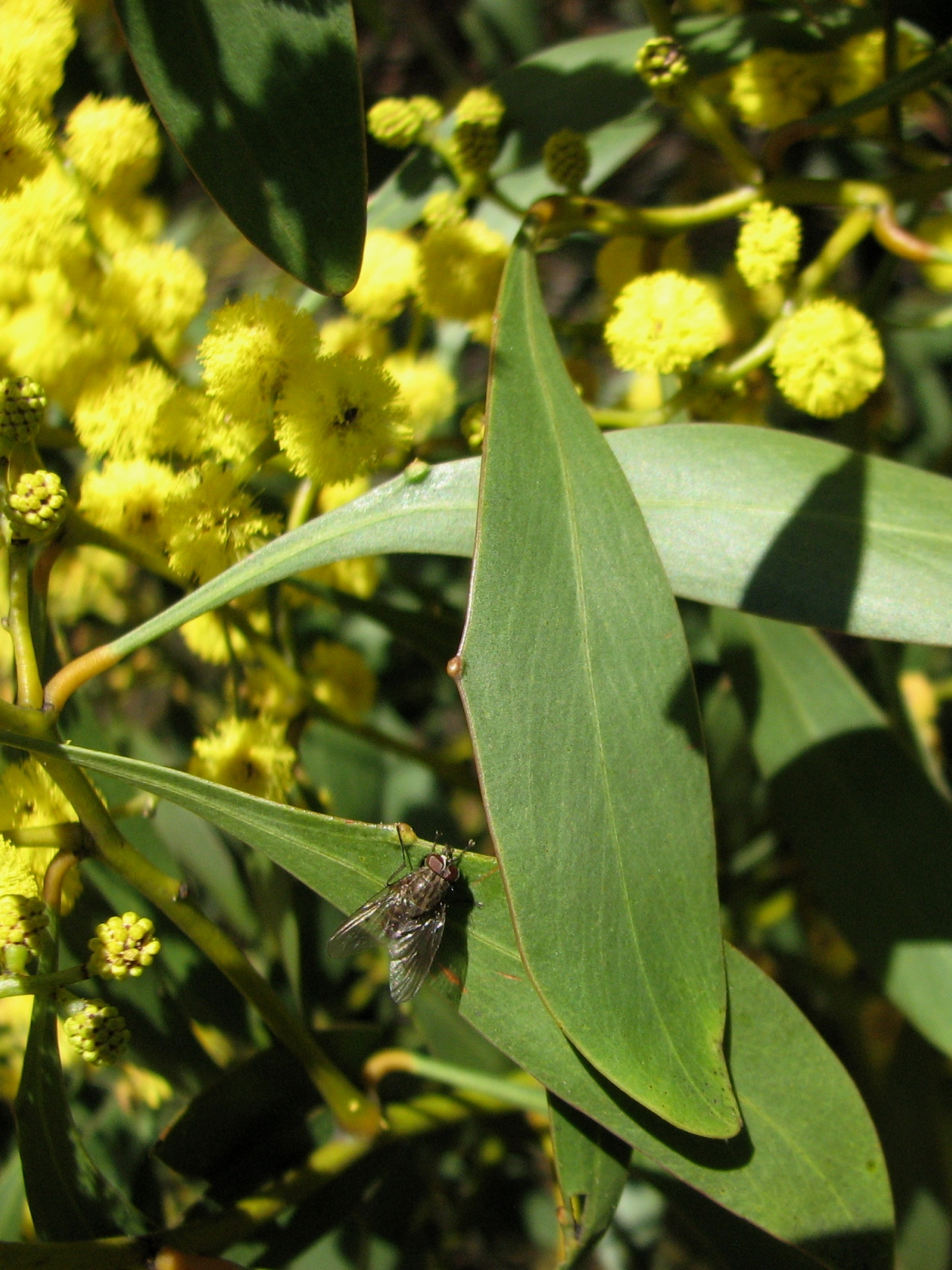
A fly visiting a nectary on a phyllode

Though plants are usually killed by a severe fire, mature specimens are able to resprout. Seeds are able to persist in the soil for more than five years, germinating after fire.

Like other wattles, Acacia pycnantha fixes nitrogen from the atmosphere. It hosts bacteria known as rhizobia that form root nodules, where they make nitrogen available in organic form and thus help the plant grow in poor soils. A field study across Australia and South Africa found that the microbes are genetically diverse, belonging to various strains of the species Bradyrhizobium japonicum and genus Burkholderia in both countries. It is unclear whether the golden wattle was accompanied by the bacteria to the African continent or encountered new populations there.

Self-incompatible, A. pycnantha cannot fertilise itself and requires cross-pollination between plants to set seed. Birds facilitate this and field experiments keeping birds away from flowers greatly reduces seed production. Nectaries are located on phyllodes; those near open flowers become active, producing nectar that birds feed upon just before or during flowering. While feeding, birds brush against the flower heads and dislodge pollen and often visit multiple trees. Several species of honeyeater, including the white-naped, yellow-faced, New Holland, and occasionally white-plumed and crescent honeyeaters, and eastern spinebills have been observed foraging. Other bird species include the silvereye, striated, buff-rumped and brown thornbills. As well as eating nectar, birds often pick off insects on the foliage. Honeybees, native bees, ants and flies also visit nectaries, but generally do not come into contact with the flowers during this activity. The presence of A. pycnantha is positively correlated with numbers of swift parrots overwintering in box–ironbark forest in central Victoria, though it is not clear whether the parrots are feeding on them or some other factor is at play.

The wood serves as food for larvae of the jewel beetle species Agrilus assimilis, A. australasiae and A. hypoleucus. The larvae of a number of butterfly species feed on the foliage including the fiery jewel, icilius blue, lithocroa blue and wattle blue. Trichilogaster wasps form galls in the flowerheads, disrupting seed set and Acizzia acaciaepycnanthae, a psyllid, sucks sap from the leaves. Acacia pycnantha is a host to rust fungus species in the genus Uromycladium that affect the phyllodes and branches. These include Uromycladium simplex that forms pustules and U. tepperianum that causes large swollen brown to black galls, which eventually lead to the death of the host plant. Two fungal species have been isolated from leaf spots on A. pycnantha: Seimatosporium arbuti, which is found on a wide range of plant hosts, and Monochaetia lutea.

== Cultivation ==
Golden wattle is cultivated in Australia and was introduced to the northern hemisphere in the mid-1800s. Although it has a relatively short lifespan of 15 to 30 years, it is widely grown for its bright yellow, fragrant flowers. As well as being an ornamental plant, it has been used as a windbreak or in controlling erosion. Trees are sometimes planted with the taller sugar gum (Eucalyptus cladocalyx) to make a two-layered windbreak. One form widely cultivated was originally collected on Mount Arapiles in western Victoria. It is floriferous, with fragrant flowers appearing from April to July. The species has a degree of frost tolerance and is adaptable to a wide range of soil conditions, but it prefers good drainage. It tolerates heavy soils in dry climates, as well as mild soil salinity. It can suffer yellowing (chlorosis) in limestone-based (alkaline) soils. Highly drought-tolerant, it needs 370–550 mm (10–20 in) winter rainfall for cultivation. It is vulnerable to gall attack in cultivation. Propagation is from seed which has been pre-soaked in hot water to soften the hard seed coating.

== Uses ==
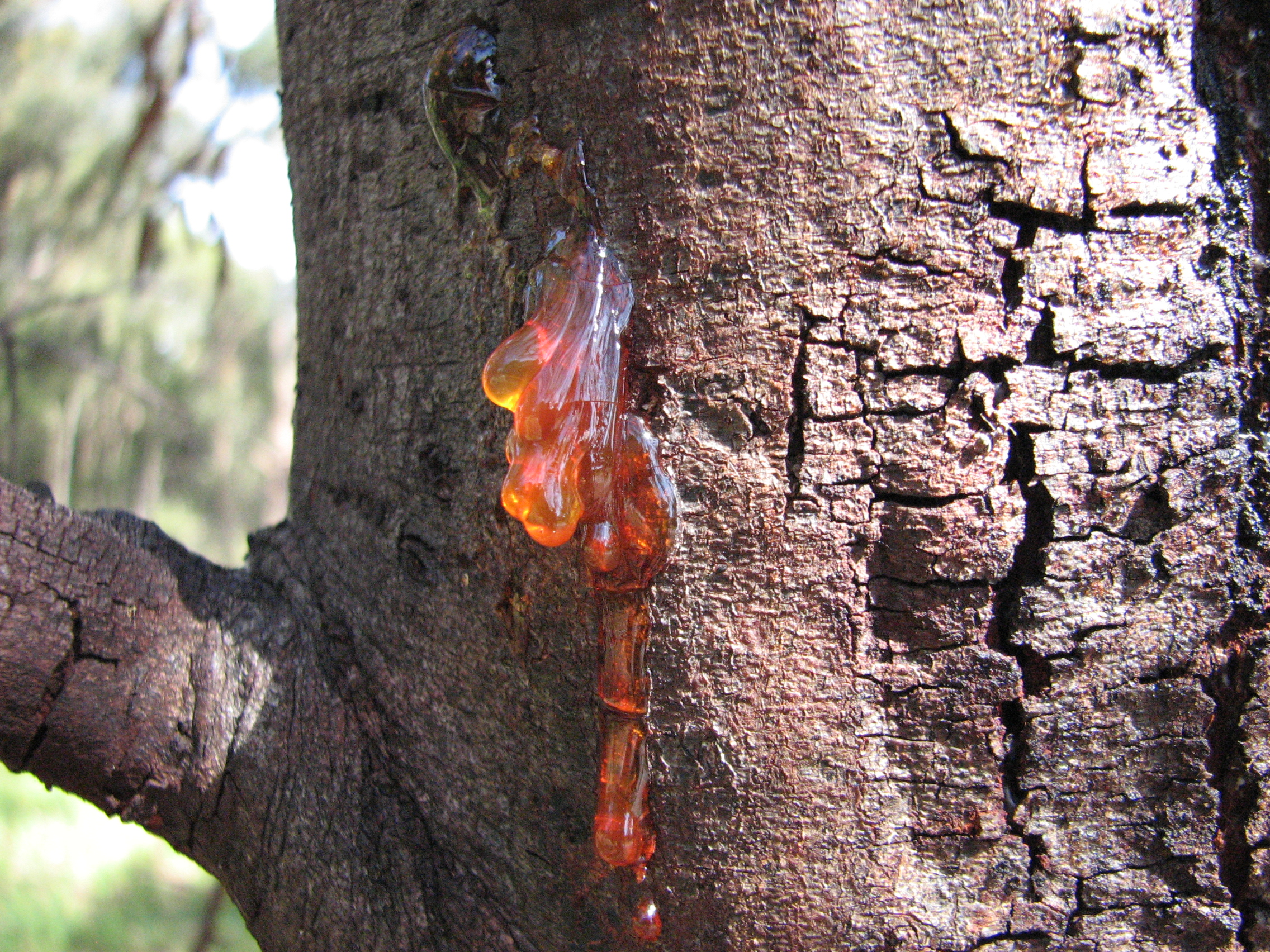
Trunk exuding gum

Golden wattle has been grown in temperate regions around the world for the tannin in its bark, as it provides the highest yield of all wattles. Trees can be harvested for tannin from seven to ten years of age. Commercial use of its timber is limited by the small size of trees, but it has high value as a fuel wood. The scented flowers have been used for perfume making, and honey production in humid areas. However, the pollen is too dry to be collected by bees in dry climates. In southern Europe, it is one of several species grown for the cut-flower trade and sold as "mimosa". Like many other species of wattle, Acacia pycnantha exudes gum when stressed. Eaten by indigenous Australians, the gum has been investigated as a possible alternative to gum arabic, commonly used in the food industry.

== In culture ==
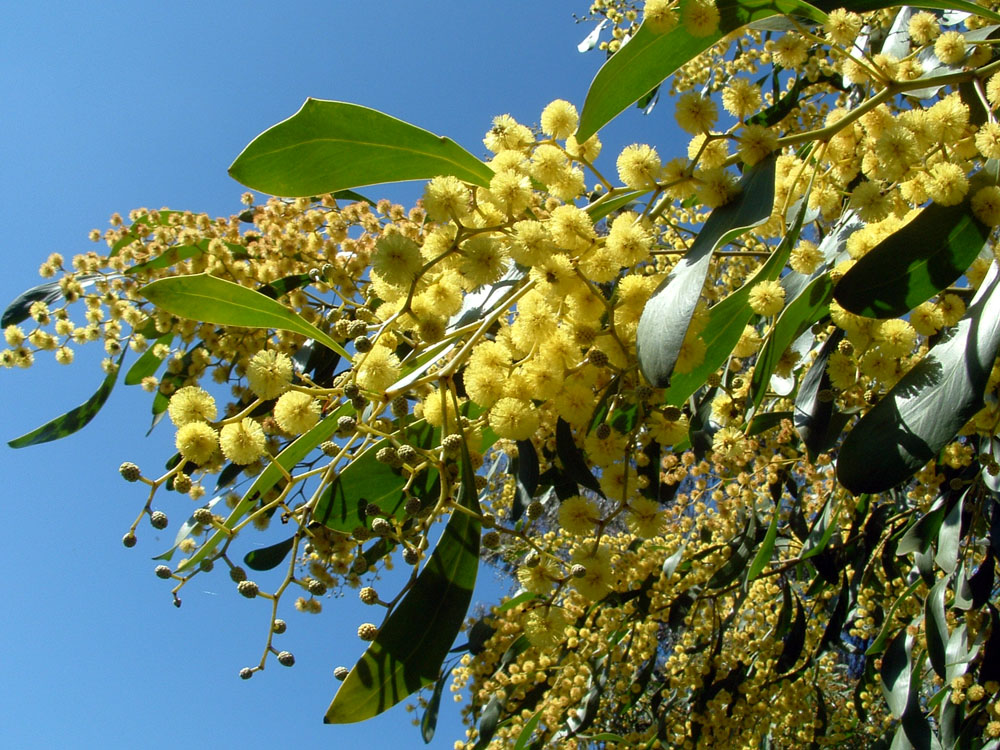
Golden wattle in full flower

Wattles, and in particular the golden wattle, have been an informal floral emblem of Australia for many years (for instance, it represented Australia on the Coronation gown of Queen Elizabeth II in 1953). While some advocates forcefully argued for the adoption of the waratah, during Australia's bicentenary in 1988 the golden wattle was formally adopted as the floral emblem of Australia. This was proclaimed by governor-general Sir Ninian Stephen (on the advice of the Hawke government) in the Commonwealth gazette published on 1 September. The day was marked by a ceremony at the Australian National Botanic Gardens, which included the planting of a golden wattle by Hazel Hawke, the prime minister's wife. In 1992, 1 September was formally declared "National Wattle Day".

The Australian Coat of Arms includes a wreath of wattle; this does not, however, accurately represent a golden wattle. Similarly, the green and gold colours used by Australian international sporting teams were inspired by the colours of wattles in general, rather than the golden wattle specifically.

The species was depicted on a stamp captioned "wattle" as part of a 1959–60 Australian stamp set featuring Australian native flowers. In 1970, a 5c stamp labelled "Golden Wattle" was issued to complement an earlier set depicting the floral emblems of Australia. To mark Australia Day in 1990, a 41c stamp labelled "Acacia pycnantha" was issued. Another stamp labelled "Golden Wattle", with a value of 70c, was issued in 2014.

Clare Waight Keller included golden wattles to represent Australia in Meghan Markle's wedding veil, which included the distinctive flora of each Commonwealth country.

The 1970 Monty Python's Flying Circus Bruces sketch includes a reference, by one of the stereotyped Australian characters, to "the wattle" as being "the emblem of our land", with suggested methods of display, including "stick[ing] it in a bottle or hold[ing] it in your hand" — despite the wattle prop itself being a large, forked branch with sparse patches of leaves and generic yellow flowers.

== See also ==
- List of flora on stamps of Australia
