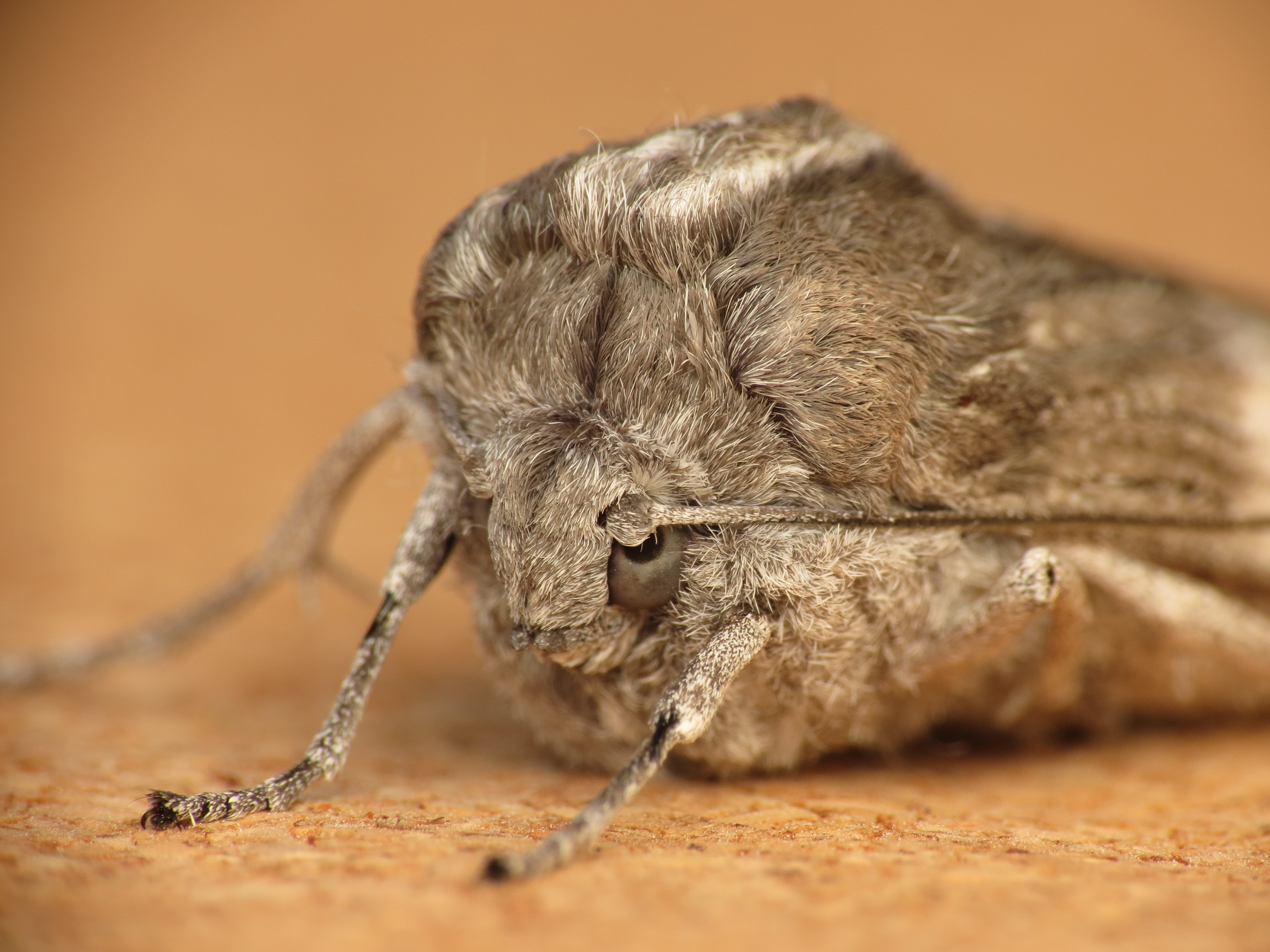
- Capusa senilis

Scientific classification
- Kingdom: Animalia
- Phylum: Arthropoda
- Class: Insecta
- Order: Lepidoptera
- Family: Geometridae
- Tribe: Nacophorini
- Genus: Capusa; Walker, 1857

Species
- About six, see text

= Capusa =

Genus of moths

Capusa is a genus of moths in the family Geometridae.

There are six species.

== Species ==
- Capusa chionopleura Turner, 1926
- Capusa cuculloides (R. Felder, 1874)
- Capusa graodes Turner, 1919
- Capusa leptoneura (Turner, 1926)
- Capusa senilis Walker, 1857
- Capusa stenophara Turner, 1919
