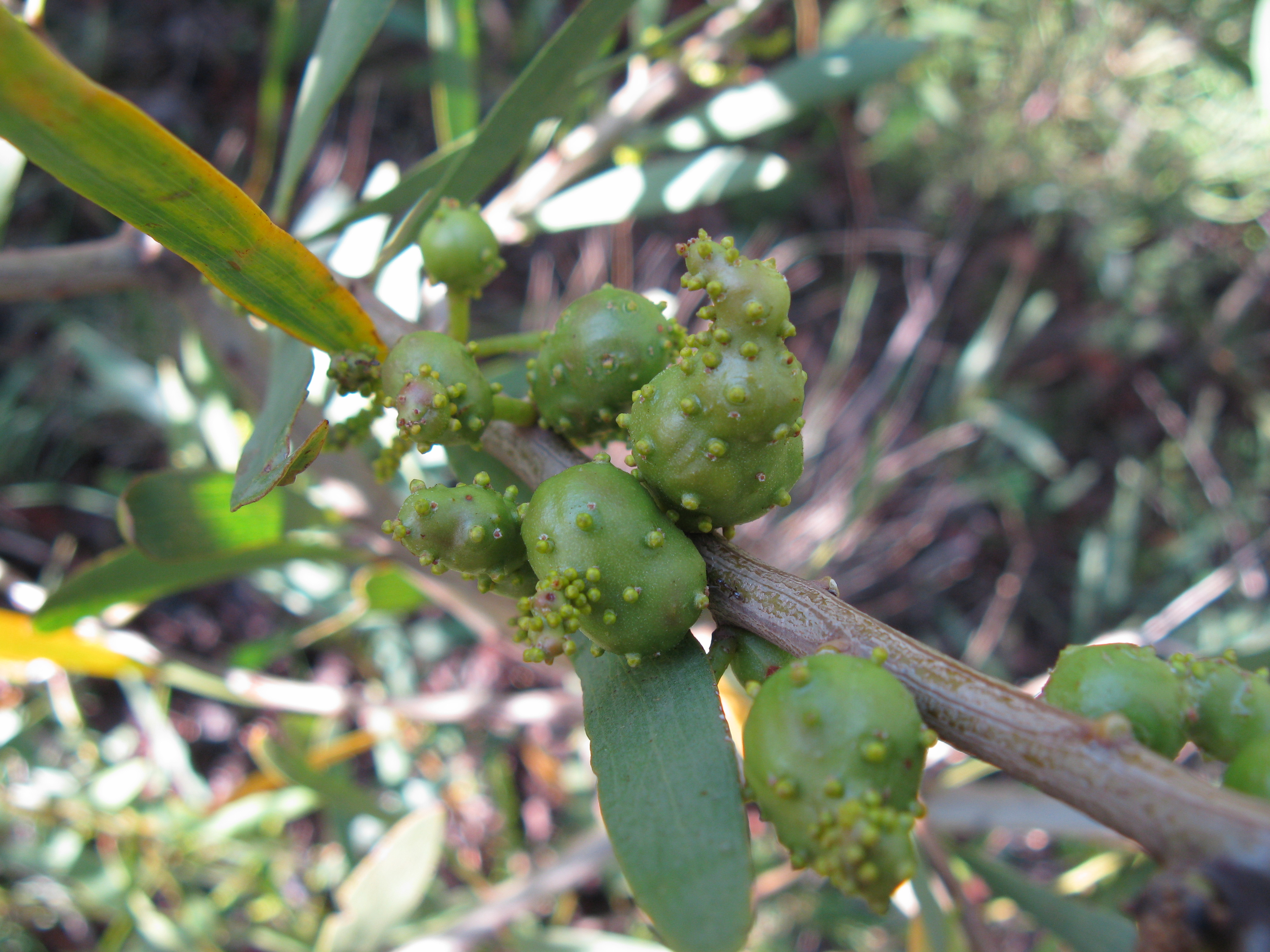
- Young galls of T. acaciaelongifoliae, still showing abortive flower rudiments.

Scientific classification
- Kingdom: Animalia
- Phylum: Arthropoda
- Class: Insecta
- Order: Hymenoptera
- Family: Melanosomellidae
- Genus: Trichilogaster
- Species: T. acaciaelongifoliae

Binomial name
- Trichilogaster acaciaelongifoliae (Froggatt, 1892)

= Trichilogaster acaciaelongifoliae =

Species of wasp

Trichilogaster acaciaelongifoliae is an Australian bud-galling wasp from the family Melanosomellidae that parasitises, among others, Acacia longifolia (long-leaved wattle, or Sydney golden wattle), which has become an invasive pest in several countries. T. acaciaelongifoliae has been introduced into South Africa in 1985 and into Portugal in 2015 as a successful biological control agent of A. longifolia.
