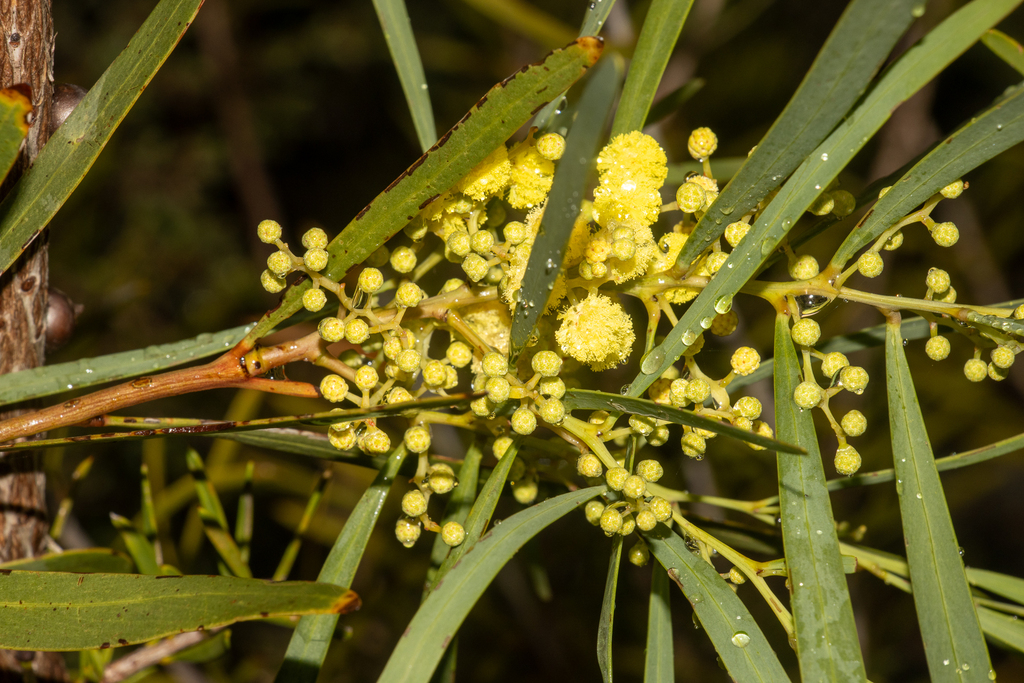
- Near Karatta, on Kangaroo Island

Scientific classification
- Kingdom: Plantae
- Clade: Tracheophytes
- Clade: Angiosperms
- Clade: Eudicots
- Clade: Rosids
- Order: Fabales
- Family: Fabaceae
- Subfamily: Caesalpinioideae
- Clade: Mimosoid clade
- Genus: Acacia
- Species: A. leiophylla

Binomial name
- Acacia leiophylla Benth.
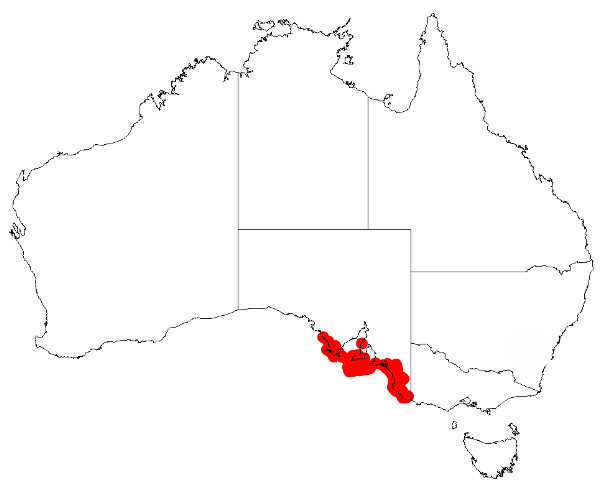
- Occurrence data from AVH

Synonyms
- Acacia leiophylla Benth. var. leiophylla; Acacia retinodes var. oraria J.M.Black ex Eardley nom. inval., nom. nud.; Acacia retinodes var. oraria J.M.Black ex Eardley; Acacia rhetinodes var. oraria Eardley orth. var.; Racosperma leiophyllum (Benth.) Pedley

= Acacia leiophylla =

Coast golden wattle

Species of plant

Acacia leiophylla is a species of flowering plant in the family Fabaceae and is endemic to coastal areas of South Australia. It is a shrub or tree with sickle-shaped, glabrous, thinly leathery phyllodes, spherical heads of bright yellow flowers and linear, firmly papery to thinly leathery pods raised over the seeds.

== Description ==
Acacia leiophylla is a shrub or tree that typically grows to a height of up to 4 m (13 ft) and has glabrous, somewhat bending branchlets. Its phyllodes are sickle-shaped, glabrous, thinly leathery, mostly 100–130 mm (3.9–5.1 in) long, 15–22 mm (0.59–0.87 in) wide with a narrowed base, on a pulvinus 9–12 mm (0.35–0.47 in) long. There is a single vein on each face of the phyllodes and a gland usually up to 8 mm (0.31 in) above the pulvinus. The flowers a borne in many spherical heads in racemes 30–70 mm (1.2–2.8 in) long on the ends of branches, or in panicles, on glabrous peduncles 3–5 mm (0.12–0.20 in) long, each head with mostly 26 to 28 densely arranged, bright yellow flowers. Flowering occurs from August to November, and the pods are linear, up to 125 mm (4.9 in) long and 5–6 mm (0.20–0.24 in) wide, firmly papery to thinly leathery and raised over the seeds. The seeds are oblong, about 5 mm (0.20 in) long and dark reddish brown, with a club-shaped aril.

Similar in appearance to A. pycnantha, it can be distinguished by its lighter phyllodes.

== Taxonomy ==
Acacia leiophylla was first formally described in 1842 by George Bentham in Hooker's London Journal of Botany from specimens collected near King George Sound by "Bagster".

Bruce Maslin and Whibley noted that "Bagster" was corrected to "Baxter" in Bentham's Flora Australiensis and that "King George Sound" is an error for "Kangaroo Island".

== Distribution and habitat ==
This species of wattle occurs along the south coast of South Australia from around Coffin Bay to the Eyre Peninsula and Mount Gambier where it grows in red, shallow, porous loamy limy to leached sands in open scrub with mallee eucalypts.

== See also ==
- List of Acacia species
