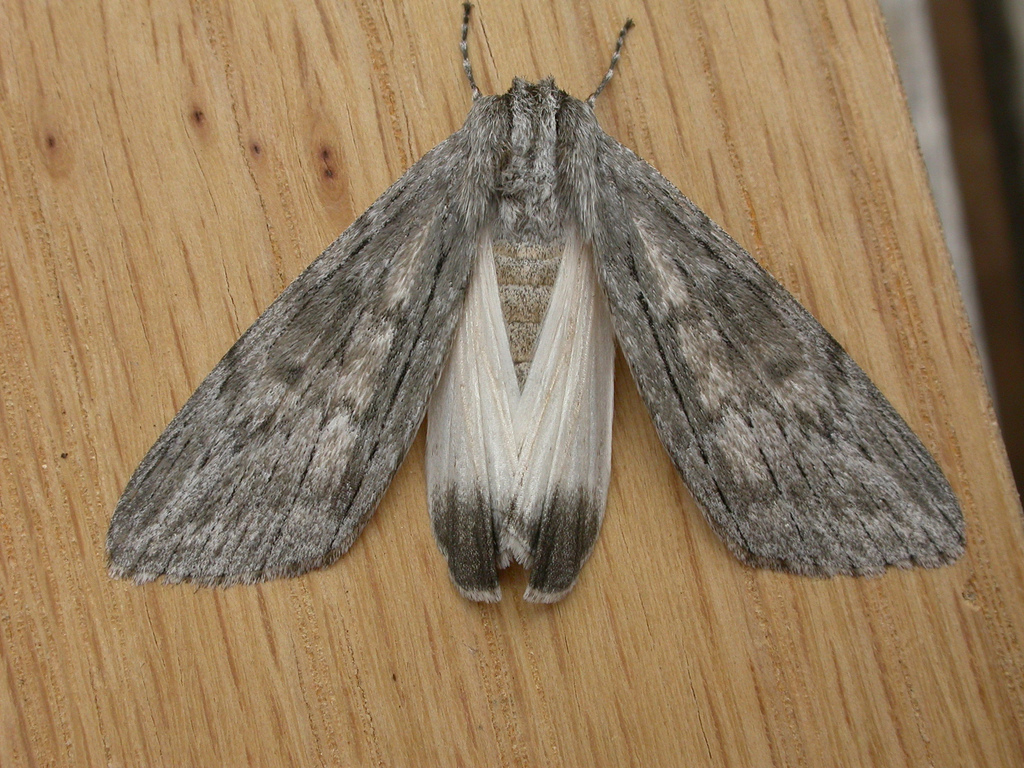

Scientific classification
- Kingdom: Animalia
- Phylum: Arthropoda
- Class: Insecta
- Order: Lepidoptera
- Family: Geometridae
- Genus: Capusa
- Species: C. senilis

Binomial name
- Capusa senilis Walker, 1857

Synonyms
- Chlenias umbraticaria

= Capusa senilis =

Species of moth

Capusa senilis, the black-banded wedge-moth, is a moth of the family Geometridae. The species was first described by Francis Walker in 1857. It is found in the south-eastern quarter of Australia.

The larvae feed on Fabaceae, Myrtaceae and Pinaceae species.
