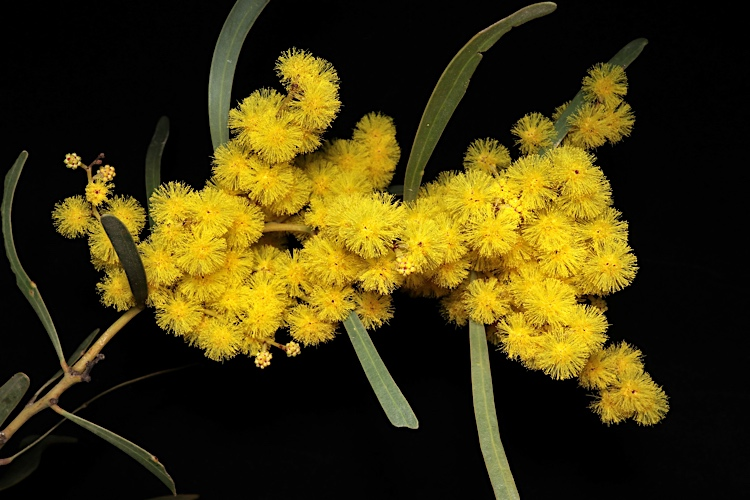
- Near Lake Cowal

Scientific classification
- Kingdom: Plantae
- Clade: Tracheophytes
- Clade: Angiosperms
- Clade: Eudicots
- Clade: Rosids
- Order: Fabales
- Family: Fabaceae
- Subfamily: Caesalpinioideae
- Clade: Mimosoid clade
- Genus: Acacia
- Species: A. hakeoides

Binomial name
- Acacia hakeoides A.Cunn. ex Benth.
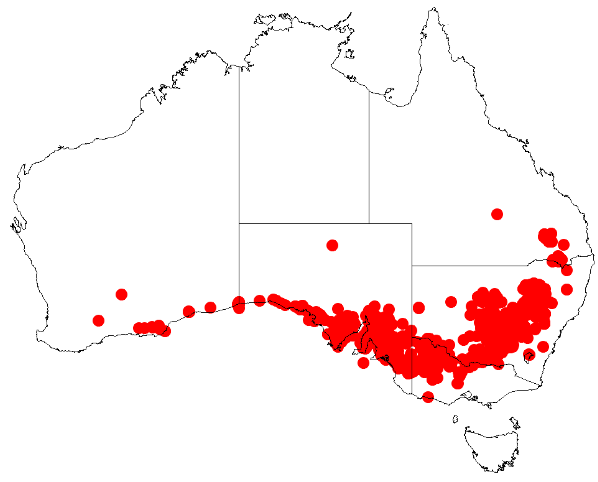
- Occurrence data from AVH

Synonyms
- ? Acacia falciformis var. propinqua Benth.; Acacia hakeoides A.Cunn. ex Benth. var. hakeoides; Racosperma hakeoides (Benth.) Pedley

= Acacia hakeoides =

Hakea wattle

Species of plant

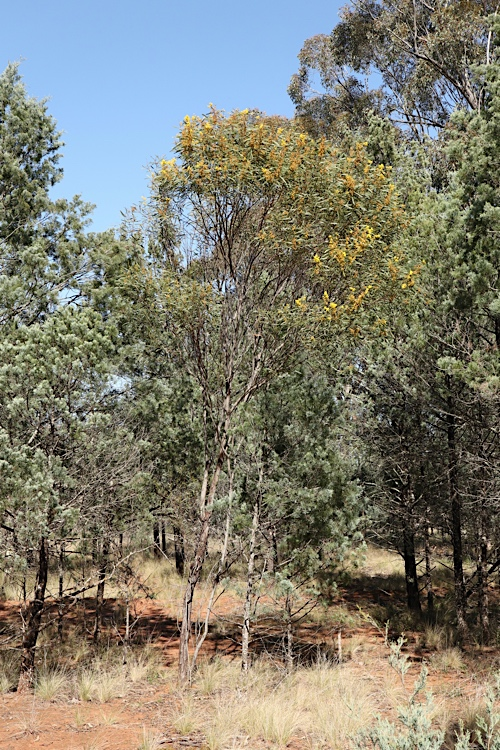
Habit near Boree Creek

Acacia hakeoides, known colloquially as hakea wattle, hakea-leaved wattle or western black wattle, is a species of flowering plant endemic to southern Australia. It is a bushy shrub or tree with lance-shaped to linear phyllodes, racemes of bright golden-yellow flowers and more or less leathery to leathery to hard and brittle pods. It can be found growing in sandy soils in semiarid and Eucalyptus woodland in the region.

== Description ==
Acacia hakeoides is a bushy shrub or small tree that typically grows to a height of 1–4 m (3 ft 3 in – 13 ft 1 in) and has glabrous branchlets. Its phyllodes are narrowly egg-shaped to lance-shaped, with the narrower end towards the base, mostly 40–120 mm (1.6–4.7 in) long and 3–12 mm (0.12–0.47 in) wide with one or two glands on the edges and a prominent midvein. The flowers are bright golden-yellow and borne in a raceme 10–80 mm (0.39–3.15 in) long at the base of phyllodes, with six to twelve clusters of 20 to 30 flowers, 4–6 mm (0.16–0.24 in) in diameter. Flowering usually occurs from July to November, and the fruit is a straight or twisted pod 70–120 mm (2.8–4.7 in) long and 4–7 mm (0.16–0.28 in) wide. The seeds are dull black, 5–7 mm (0.20–0.28 in) long, with a club-shaped aril.

== Taxonomy ==
Acacia hakeoides was first formally describe in 1842 by George Bentham in the London Journal of Botany from an unpublished description by Allan Cunningham. The specific epithet (hakeiodes) means "Hakea-like".

== Distribution and habitat ==
Hakea wattle is widespread and common in open scrub, Eucalyptus woodland or mallee in western New South Wales, north-western Victoria, southern coastal areas of South Australia including the Nullarbor region, and the Coolgardie, Hampton, Mallee and Nullarbor bioregions of southern Western Australia.

== Uses ==
The seed of "Acacia hakeoides" is edible and it has been suggested that this seed is suitable for culinary use as a flavouring agent, as a stable carbohydrate or as a coffee substitute, among others. In light of this fact, the species has been listed by one study as a medium priority species of interest for domestication for seed production purposes.
