= Melanosomellidae =

Scientific classification
- Kingdom: Animalia
- Phylum: Arthropoda
- Class: Insecta
- Order: Hymenoptera
- Superfamily: Chalcidoidea
- Family: Melanosomellidae; Girault, 1913

Family of wasps

Melanosomellidae is a family of parasitic wasps in the superfamily Chalcidoidea; it includes 31 described genera, which are mostly found the southern hemisphere. Although the biology of most of these wasps is unknown, the larvae and pupae of some species develop in leaf galls or stem galls on various trees.

== Genera ==
This family contains the following genera:

- Aditrochus Rübsaamen
- Aeschylia Girault, 1929
- Alloderma Ashmead, 1904
- Alyxiaphagus Riek, 1962
- Australicesa Koçak & Kemal
- Brachyscelidiphaga Ashmead, 1900
- Encyrtocephalus Ashmead, 1900
- Epelatus Girault, 1928
- Espinosa Gahan
- Eurytomomma Girault, 1920
- Hansonita Bouček, 1993
- Hubena Bouček, 1988
- Indoclava Gupta, Khan, & Agnihotri
- Krivena Bouček, 1988
- Lincolna Girault, 1940
- Lisseurytoma Cameron, 1912
- Mayrellus Crawford
- Megamelanosoma Girault, 1928
- Nambouria Bouček, 1988
- Neochalcissia Girault, 1920
- Neoperilampus Girault & Dodd, 1915
- Perilampella Girault & Dodd, 1915
- Perilampomyia Girault, 1916
- Plastobelyta Kieffer
- Queenslandia Koçak & Kemal
- Systolomorpha Ashmead, 1900
- Terobiella Ashmead, 1900 [= Melanosomella Girault, 1913 - type genus]
- Trichilogaster Mayr, 1905
- Westra Bouček, 1988
- Wubina Bouček, 1988
- Xantheurytoma Cameron, 1912
