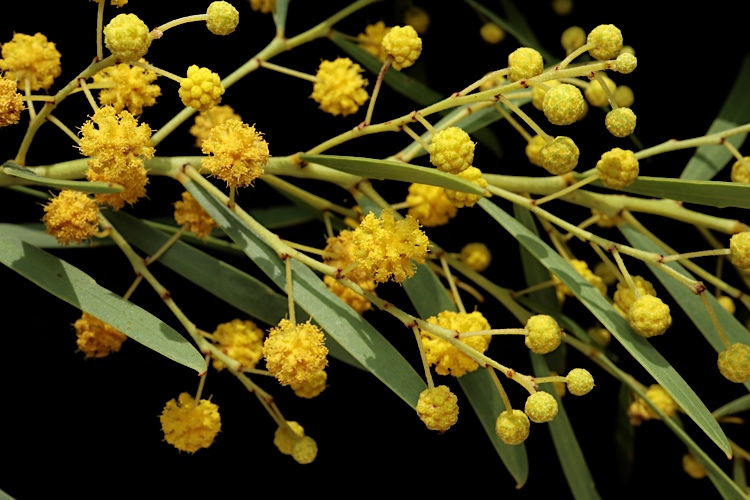

Scientific classification
- Kingdom: Plantae
- Clade: Tracheophytes
- Clade: Angiosperms
- Clade: Eudicots
- Clade: Rosids
- Order: Fabales
- Family: Fabaceae
- Subfamily: Caesalpinioideae
- Clade: Mimosoid clade
- Genus: Acacia
- Species: A. rivalis

Binomial name
- Acacia rivalis J.M.Black
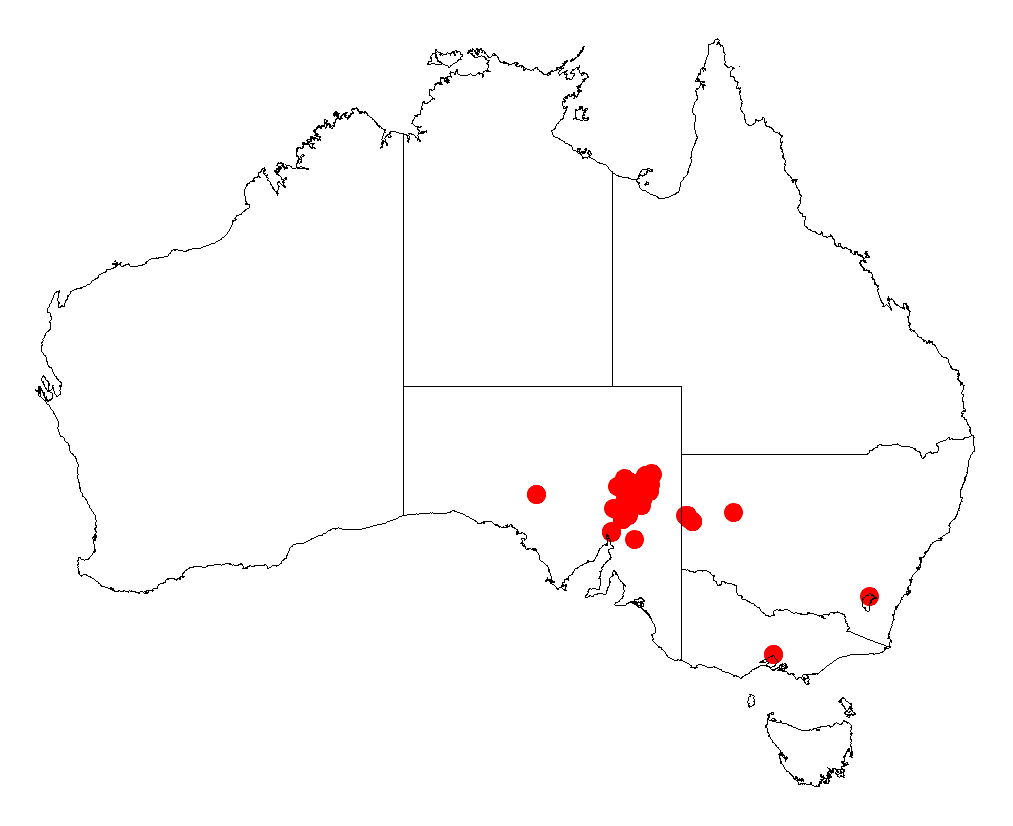
- Occurrence data from AVH

= Acacia rivalis =

Silver wattle

Species of plant

Acacia rivalis commonly known as silver wattle or creek wattle, is a flowering shrub or tree in the family Fabaceae and the subgenus Phyllodineae native to southern Australia.

== Description ==
The obconic shrub or tree typically grows to a height of 3 to 5 metres (9.8 to 16.4 ft) and has a bushy domed crown. The green linear lanceolate shaped phyllodes have a length of up to 14 cm (5.5 in) and a width of 5 mm (0.20 in). The glabrous and shiny phyllodes are narrowed towards the base and have a prominent central vein. It blooms between May and November producing yellow flowers. The simple axillary inflorescences are solitary and have small spherical yellow flower-heads. The smooth, brown and linear shaped seed pods that form after flowering can be straight or curved and have a length of up to 12 cm (4.7 in) and a width of 5 mm (0.20 in). The hard, black seeds found within the pods have an ellipsoidal shape with a length of 7 mm (0.28 in) and a width of 4 mm (0.16 in).

== Distribution ==
It is endemic to some small areas on the Flinders Range in South Australia near Hawker in the south to around Mount Harris in the north and also around Wilgena much further to the west where it is found on ridges, stony slopes and along watercourses growing in shallow calcareous loamy soils as a part of tall open scrubland communities

== See also ==
- List of Acacia species
