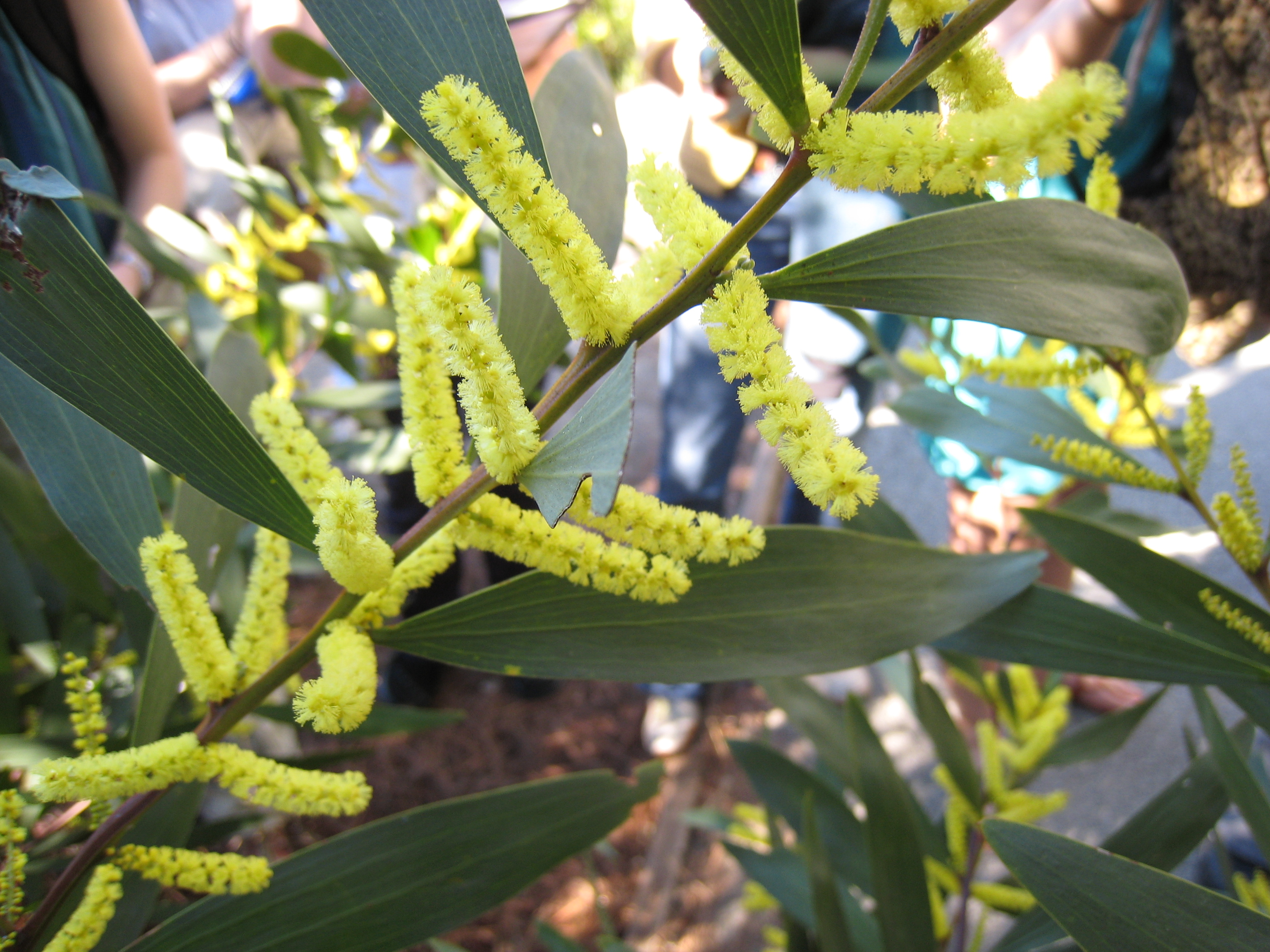
- Foliage and blossoms

Conservation status
- Least Concern (IUCN 3.1)

Scientific classification
- Kingdom: Plantae
- Clade: Tracheophytes
- Clade: Angiosperms
- Clade: Eudicots
- Clade: Rosids
- Order: Fabales
- Family: Fabaceae
- Subfamily: Caesalpinioideae
- Clade: Mimosoid clade
- Genus: Acacia
- Species: A. longifolia

Binomial name
- Acacia longifolia (Andrews) Willd.
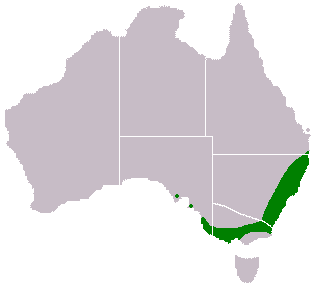
- Range of Acacia longifolia

Synonyms
- Mimosa longifolia Andrews; Mimosa macrostachya Poir. nom. illeg., nom. superfl.; Phyllodoce longifolia (Andrews) Link; Racosperma longifolium Pedley nom. inval.; Racosperma longifolium (Andrews) Pedley

= Acacia longifolia =

Species of plant

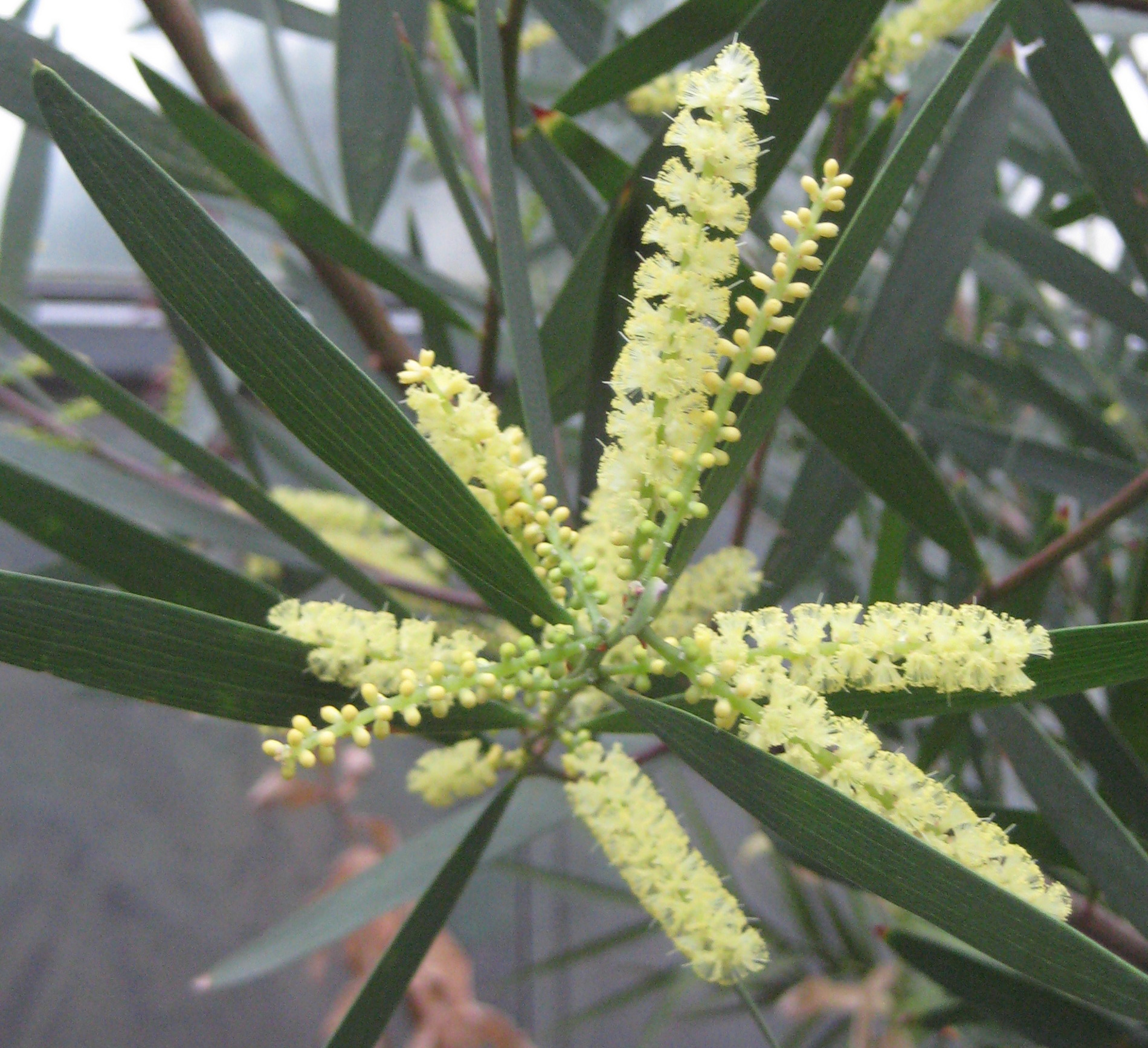
Foliage and inflorescences

Acacia longifolia, commonly known as Sydney golden wattle or sallow wattle, is a species of flowering plant in the family Fabaceae and is endemic to the south-east of mainland Australia. It is a shrub or erect, spreading tree with glabrous branchlets, elliptic to very narrowly elliptic phyllodes, spikes of usually golden yellow flowers and straight to strongly twisted, leathery pods, sometimes appearing like a string of beads. It is sometimes considered an invasive species in other places.

== Description ==
Acacia longifolia is a shrub or erect, spreading tree that typically grows to a height of 1–10 m (3 ft 3 in – 32 ft 10 in) and has glabrous branchlets and smooth or finely fissured grey bark. Its phyllodes are straight or slightly curved, 40–250 mm (1.6–9.8 in) long, 10–35 mm (0.39–1.38 in) wide, with two to four prominent veins, a gland 3–8 mm (0.12–0.31 in) above the pulvinus, and sometimes a small point on the end. Its flowers are golden yellow, sometimes paler, and borne in one or two mostly sessile spikes 20–50 mm (0.79–1.97 in) long in axils. Flowering occurs between June and October, and the pods are mostly cylindrical, straight to strongly twisted, sometimes appearing like a string of beads, 50–150 mm (2.0–5.9 in) long, 3–6 mm (0.12–0.24 in) wide, thinly leathery or firmly papery and brittle when dry. The seeds are elliptic, 4–6 mm (0.16–0.24 in) long and shiny with a large, skirt-like aril.

== Taxonomy ==
In 1802, Henry Cranke Andrews first formally described this species as Mimosa longifolia in his book The Botanist's Repository for New, and Rare Plants. In 1806 Carl Ludwig Willdenow transferred the species to Acacia as A. longifolia in Species Plantarum. The specific epithet (longifolia) refers to the long phyllodes of this species.

In 2001, Arthur Court, Anthony Orchard and Annette Wilson described two subspecies of Acacia longifolia in the Flora of Australia, and the names are accepted by the Australian Plant Census:

- Acacia longifolia (Andrews) Willd. subsp. longifolia has phyllodes mostly 50–200 mm (2.0–7.9 in) long, 5–20 mm (0.20–0.79 in), thin and pliable, the pods mostly straight.
- Acacia longifolia subsp. sophorae (Labill.) Court has phyllodes mostly 40–120 mm (1.6–4.7 in) long, 5–20 mm (0.20–0.79 in), often thick and sometimes fleshy, the pods mostly coiled or twisted.

Plants of the World Online lists Acacia sophorae subsp. sophorae as a synonym of Acacia sophorae (Labill.) R.Br..

== Distribution ==
This species of Acacia is native to southeastern Australia, from the extreme southeast of Queensland, through eastern New South Wales, eastern and southern Victoria, southeastern South Australia, and Tasmania. The species is endemic to coastal area of south eastern Queensland close to the border with New South Wales extending southward down the coast of New South Wales. In New South Wales it is common along the tablelands and coastal areas where it grows in various habitats including foredunes and in sclerophyll woodland or coastal heath and scrub. The range then extends south and east through Victoria and into South Australia, where it is found on the Eyre Peninsula, Yorke Peninsula, Kangaroo Island, southern Mount Lofty Ranges, and throughout the south-eastern region, where it is mostly restricted to sand dunes. The subspecies, sophorae, grows in sand dunes around the Tasmanian coastline.

It has become naturalised in the south west of Western Australia in coastal areas extending from around Perth in the north down to around Albany in the south. It is thought to have been introduced by escaping from gardens or being used in revegetation plantings. Control methods include hand pulling seedlings, ringbarking, or cutting the plant down and painting the stump with glyphosate.

== Uses ==
Acacia longifolia is widely cultivated in subtropical regions of the world. Its uses include prevention of soil erosion, food (flowers, seeds and seed pods), yellow dye (from the flowers), green dye (pods) and wood. The flower colour derives from the organic compound kaempferol. The tree's bark has limited use in tanning, primarily for sheepskin. It is useful for securing uninhabited sand in coastal areas, primarily where there are not too many hard frosts. In Tasmania the ripening pods were roasted and the seeds removed and eaten.

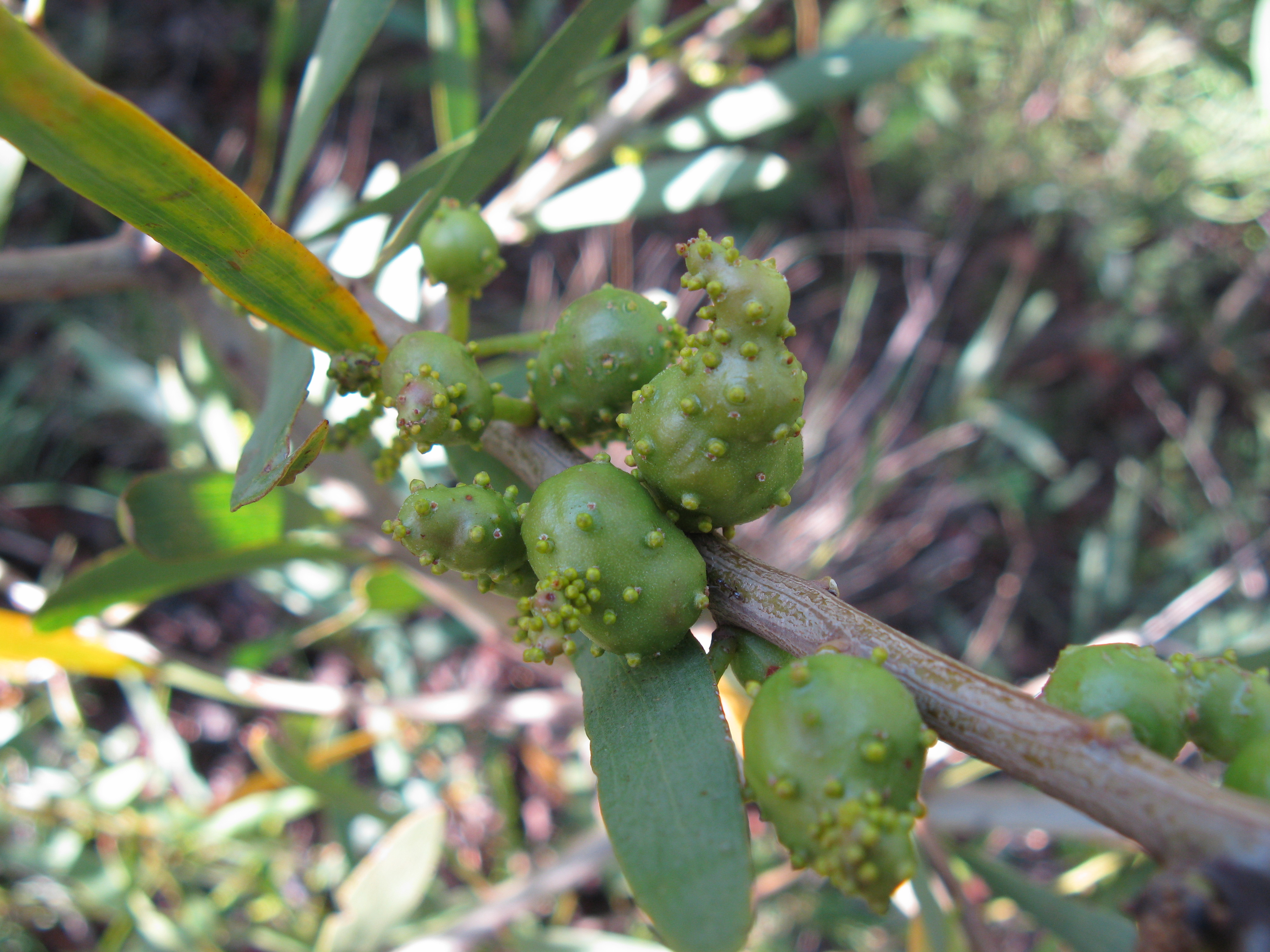
Young galls of Trichilogaster acaciaelongifoliae, showing the branch morphology of the galled buds.

== Cultivation ==
Despite its weed potential outside its normal range, the shrub is available commercially and can be propagated by seed scarification or boiling water treatment. It is regarded as an attractive, hardy, fast-growing species suitable as a hedge plant or for screening. Suitable for hydroseeding work on banks where it will provide soil stabilization. Sydney golden wattle is well suited for low maintenance areas such as road batters, will grow in a range of soil types and is frost hardy. It is heavily used at present in Southern California as a street canopy tree, as it grows fairly quickly (reaching a height of five meters within a year or two of planting), tolerates drought, and is resilient even to the particularly brutal pruning practices associated with low-cost tree services.

In Portugal the species is considered highly invasive in sand dunes, and its cultivation is prohibited by law.

== Invasive species ==
It is not listed as being a threatened species, and is considered invasive in Portugal, New Zealand and South Africa. In the southern region of Western Australia, it has become naturalised and has been classed as a weed due to its out-competing indigenous species. It can grow very quickly, reaching 7–10 m in five to six years.

Originally from Australia, Acacia longifolia, sometimes known as Sydney golden wattle, is an invasive tree species that has spread to Mediterranean habitats, including Portuguese coastal dunes. Its quick growth, high seed output, and capacity to fix nitrogen allow it to outcompete native plants and change soil conditions, decreasing biodiversity and altering ecological processes. Originally, it was planted to stabilize sand dunes and prevent erosion.

== Control ==
In South Africa at least, the Pteromalid wasp Trichilogaster acaciaelongifoliae has been introduced from Australia, and has spread rapidly, achieving substantial control. The effect on the trees has been described as drastic seed reduction (typically over 90%) by galling of reproductive buds, and indirect debilitation of the affected plant by increased abscission of inflorescences adjacent to the growing galls. The presence of galls also caused leaf abscission, reducing vegetative growth as well as reproductive output.

== Phytochemistry ==
- Kaempferol (3,4′,5,7-tetrahydroxyflavone)
- N-(2-imidazol-4-yl-ethyl)-trans-cinnamamide
- N-(2-imidazol-4-yl-ethyl)-deca-trans-2, cis-4-dienamide
- Dimethyltryptamine 0.2–0.3% & Histamine

== Gallery ==
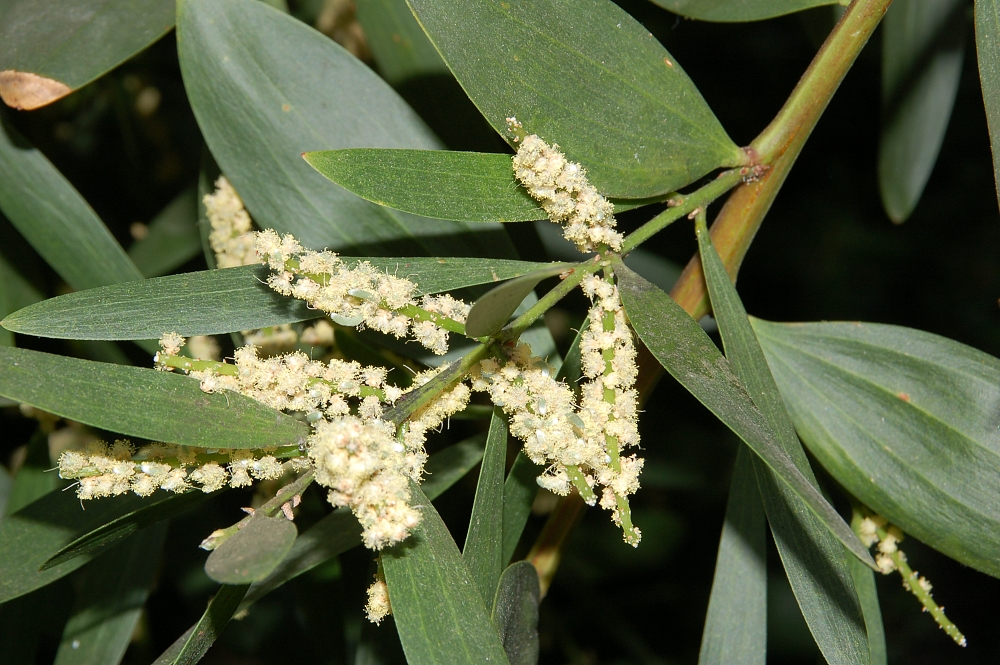
Flowering

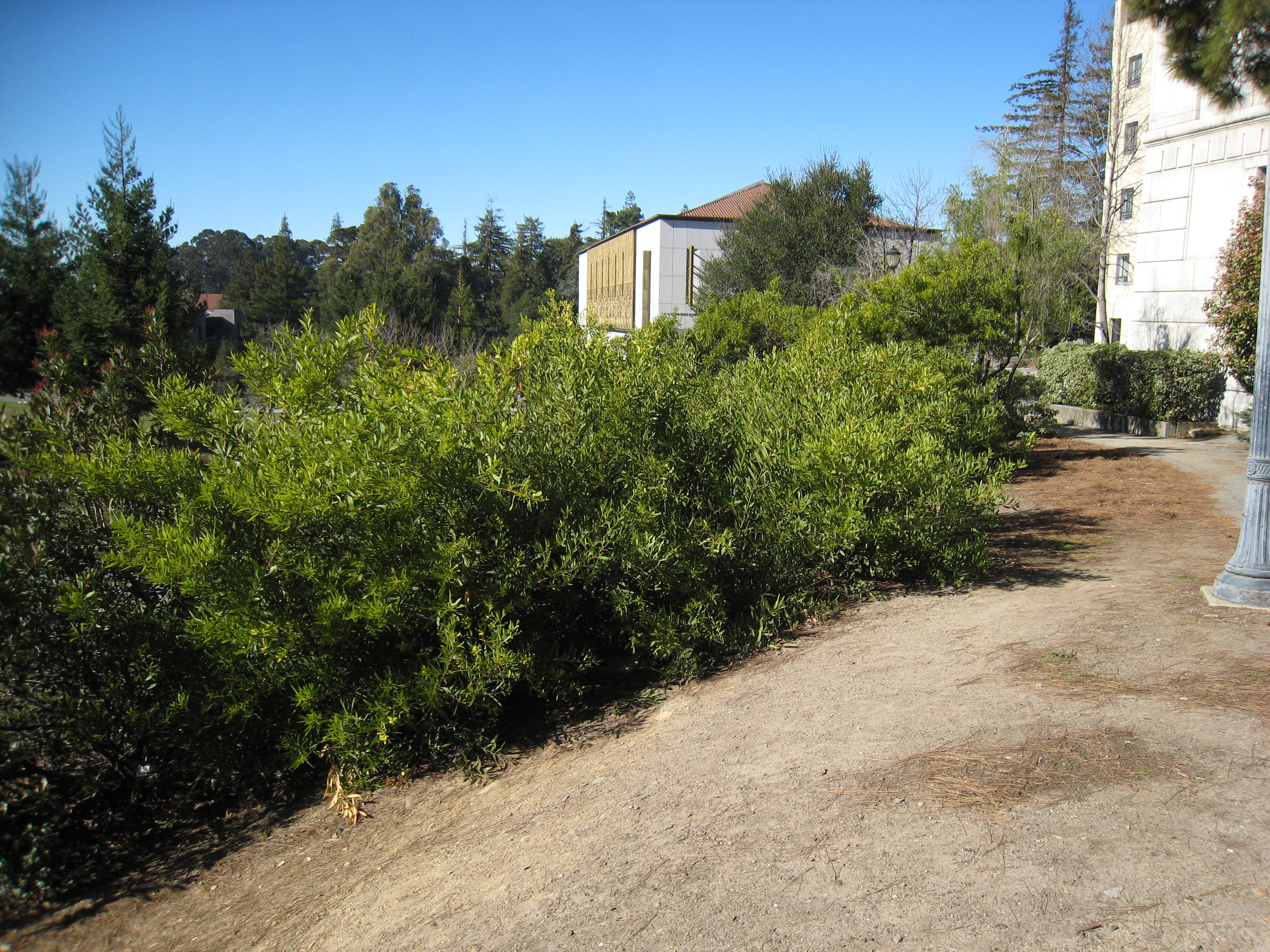
Bushy habitat

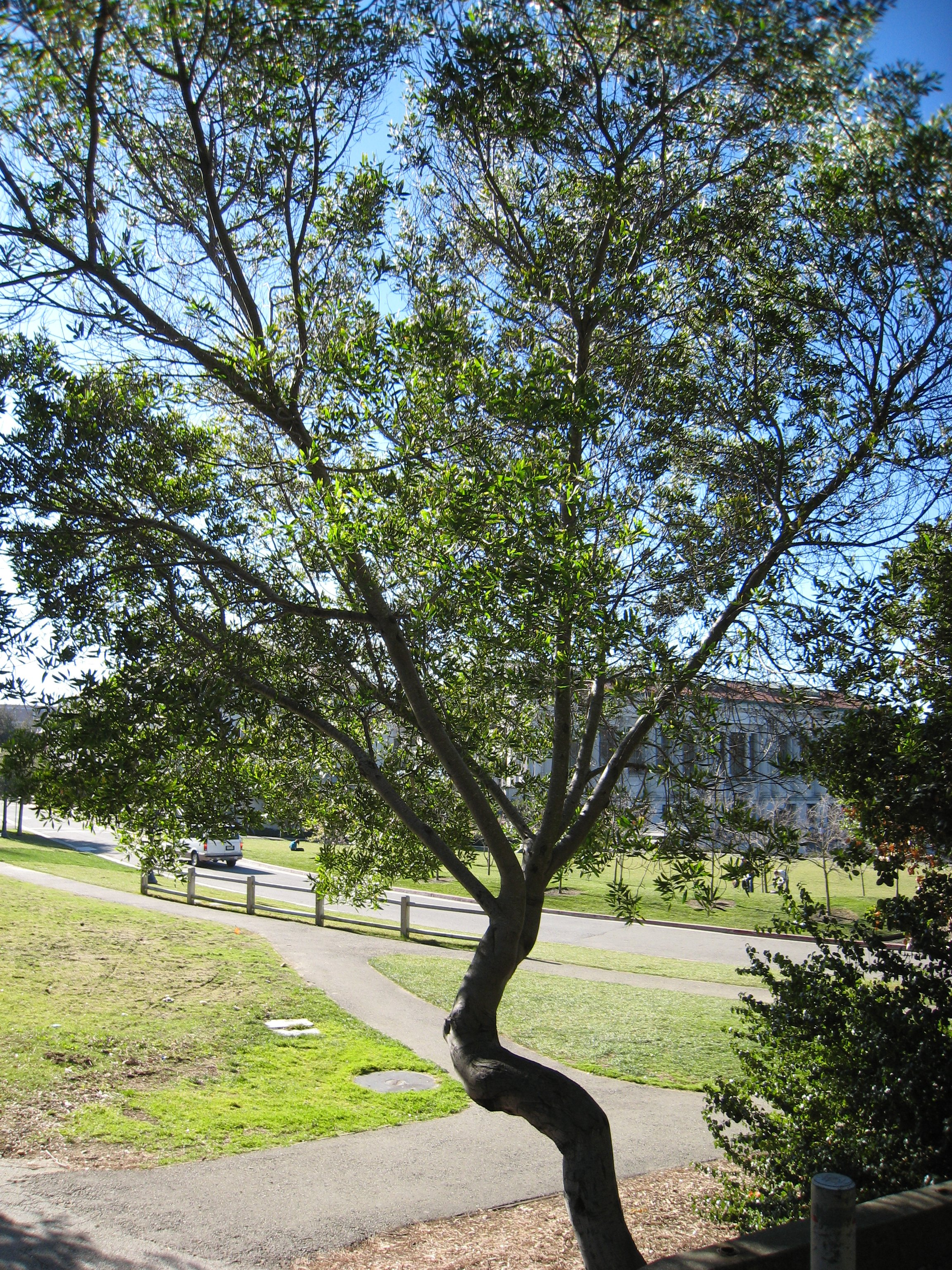
Cultivated

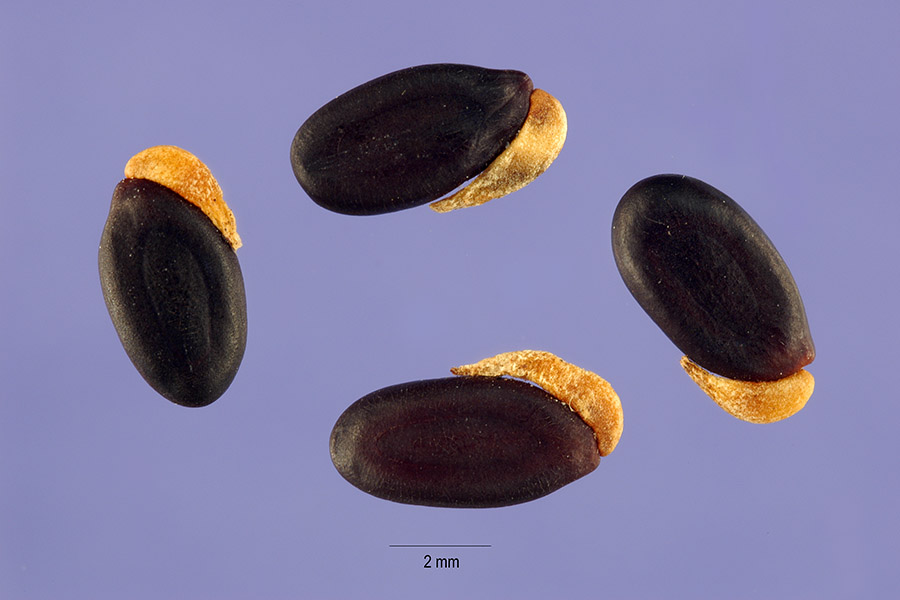
Seeds

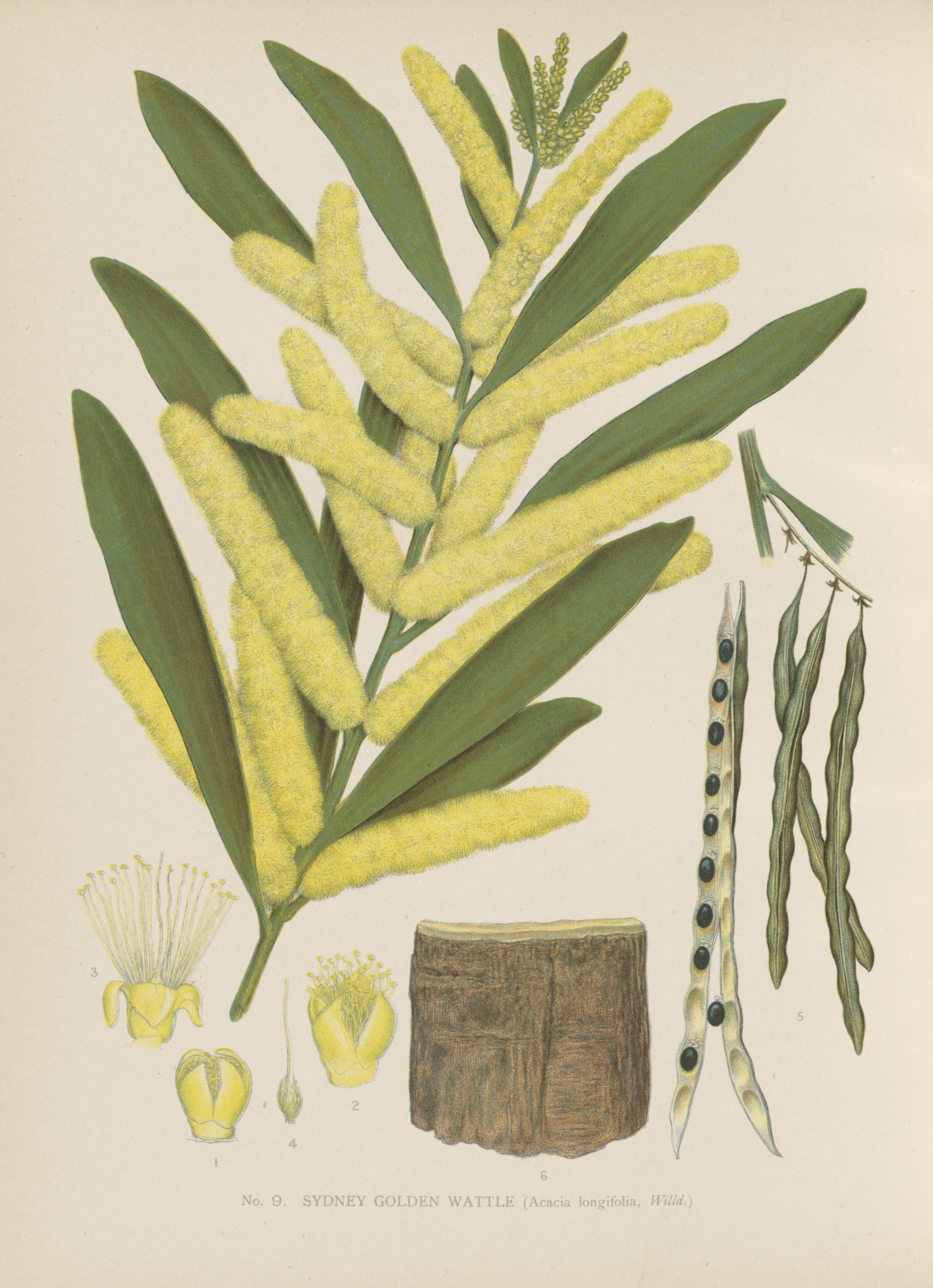
Illustration

== See also ==
- List of Acacia species
