= Bibliography of World War II =

This is a bibliography of works on World War II. The bibliography aims to include primary, secondary and tertiary sources regarding the European theatre of World War II (1939–1945) and the Pacific War (1941–1945). By extension, it includes works regarding the Second Sino-Japanese War (1937–1945). Additionally, the scope of the bibliography expands to the causes of World War II and the immediate aftermath of World War II, such as evacuation and expulsion and war crimes trials (including the Nuremberg Trials and the Tokyo Trials). Works on the causes or the aftermath of World War II should only be included if they describe the respective events in the specific context of and relation to the conflict itself.

There are thousands of books written about World War II; therefore, this is not an all-inclusive list. This bibliography also does not aim to include fictional works (see World War II in popular culture). It does not aim to include self-published works, unless there is a very good reason to do so.

== Origins of World War II ==
The following lists should include works of secondary literature that are concerned mainly with the origins of World War II in general or with the entry into World War II by one particular country.

- Aldrich, Richard J. (1993). The Key to the South: Britain, the United States, and Thailand during the Approach of the Pacific War, 1929–1942. New York: Oxford University Press.
- Baker, Nicholson (2006). Human Smoke: The Beginnings of World War II, the End of Civilization. New York: Simon & Schuster.
- Deighton, Len (1993). Blood, Tears and Folly: An Objective Look at World War II. New York: HarperCollins.
- Del Boca, Angelo (1969). The Ethiopian War, 1935–1941. Translated by Cummins, P. D. Chicago: University of Chicago Press.
- Henig, Ruth (1985). The Origins of the Second World War 1933–1941. Taylor & Francis. ISBN 0-203-33227-X.
- Ienaga, Saburo (1978). The Pacific War: 1931–45. New York: Pantheon.
- Iriye, Akira (1987). The Origins of the Second World War in Asia and the Pacific. New York and London: Longman.
- Johnson, Ian Ona (2021). Faustian Bargain: The Soviet-German Partnership and the Origins of the Second World War. Oxford University Press. ISBN 978-0-19-067514-1.
- Martel, Gordon (1986). The Origins of the Second World War Reconsidered. Routledge. ISBN 0-203-01024-8.
- McDonough, Frank (2011). The Origins of the Second World War: An International Perspective. Continuum. ISBN 978-1-4411-0773-2.
- Murray, Williamson (1984). The Change in the European Balance of Power 1938–1939. Princeton, New Jersey: Princeton University Press.
- Neville, Peter (2000). Appeasing Hitler: The Diplomacy of Sir Nevile Henderson, 1937–39. Palgrave Macmillan. ISBN 0-333-71495-4.
- Overy, Richard (2022). The Origins of the Second World War (5th ed.). Routledge. ISBN 978-1-138-96326-9.
- Salerno, Reynolds Mathewson (2002). Vital Crossroads: Mediterranean Origins of the Second World War. Ithaca, New York: Cornell University Press.
- Taylor, A. J. P. (1961). The Origins of the Second World War. London: Hamish Hamilton.
- Young, Robert J. (1996). France and the Origins of the Second World War. Palgrave Macmillan. ISBN 978-1-349-24890-2.

== Military history, by theater ==
=== Global military history ===
- Bartrop, Paul R. (2022). The Routledge History of the Second World War. Routledge. ISBN 978-0-429-45535-3.
- Beevor, Antony (2012). The Second World War. London: Weidenfeld & Nicolson.
- Bell, P. M. H. (2011). Twelve Turning Points of the Second World War. New Haven and London: Yale University Press.
- Bess, Michael (2008). Choices under Fire: Moral Dimensions of World War II. New York: Vintage.
- Boog, Horst; et al. (2001). Osers, Ewald (ed.). The Global War. Germany and the Second World War. Vol. VI. Oxford: Clarendon. ISBN 978-0-19-873830-5. OL 7397819M.
- Buchanan, Andrew. "Globalizing the Second World War," Past and Present no. 258 (February 2023): 246–281. online; also see
- Burleigh, Michael (2010). Moral Combat: Good and Evil in World War II. New York: HarperCollins.
- Calvocoressi, Peter; Wint, Guy (1972). Total War: The Story of World War II. New York: Pantheon. ISBN 978-0-394-47104-4.
- Commager, Henry Steele (1991). The Story of the Second World War. Washington DC: Brassey's. ISBN 978-0-08-041066-1.
- Dear, I. C. B.; Foot, M. R. D., eds. (1995). The Oxford Guide to World War II. New York: Oxford University Press.
- Gilbert, Martin (1989). The Second World War. New York: Henry Holt and Company. ISBN 978-0-8050-0534-9.
- Hanson, Victor Davis (2017). The Second World Wars: How the First Global Conflict Was Fought and Won. New York: Basic Books.
- Hastings, Max (2001). All Hell Let Loose: The World at War 1939–1945. London: HarperCollins.
- Keegan, John (1989). The Second World War. New York: Viking.
- Kitchen, Martin (1990). A World in Flames: A Short History of the Second World War in Europe and Asia, 1939–1945. London: Longman.
- Lyons, Michael J. (1999). World War II: A Short History. Upper Saddle River, N.J.: Prentice Hall.
- Mercer, Derrik, ed. (1990). Chronicle of the Second World War. Harlow, Essex, UK: Longman Group.
- Murray, Williamson; Millett, Allan R. (2000). A War To Be Won: Fighting the Second World War. Harvard University Press.
- Nardo, Don (2005). World War II. Detroit: Greenhaven Press.
- Overy, Richard (1997). Why the Allies Won. New York: W. W. Norton & Company.
- ———, ed. (2015). The Oxford Illustrated History of World War II. Oxford University Press.
- ——— (2021). Blood and Ruins: The Last Imperial War, 1931–1945. New York: Viking.
- Parker, R. A. C. (2002). Second World War: A Short History. Oxford: Oxford Paperbacks.
- Roberts, Andrew (2011). The Storm of War: A New History of the Second World War. New York: Harper Perennial. ISBN 978-0-06-122859-9.
- Schreiber, Gerhard (2003). Der Zweite Weltkrieg [The Second World War] (in German). München: Verlag C.H.Beck.
- Snyder, Louis L. (1982). Historical Guide to World War II. Westport, Connecticut: Greenwood Press.
- Stokesbury, James L. (1980). A Short History of World War II. New York: Morrow.
- Ward, Geoffrey C.; Burns, Ken (2007). The War: An Intimate History, 1941–1945. New York: A. A. Knopf. ISBN 978-0-307-26283-7. LCCN 2007003640. OCLC 209249990. OL 22764689M.
- Weinberg, Gerhard L. (1994). A World at Arms: A Global History of World War II. New York: Cambridge University Press.
- Willmott, H.P. (2008). The Great Crusade. Dulles, Virginia: Potomac Books.
- Wright, Gordon (1968). The Ordeal of Total War, 1939–1945. New York: Harper & Row. ISBN 978-0-06-131408-7.

== Military history, by type of warfare ==
=== Aerial warfare ===
For general histories of national air forces, check the "specific military branches" section. For development of airplanes and technical histories, check the "science and technology" section.

==== Aerial warfare by country ====
===== Germany =====
- Williamson, Murray (1983). Strategy for Defeat: The Luftwaffe 1933–1945. Air University Press. ISBN 978-1-78625-770-3.

===== United States =====
- Allen, Bruce (1943). Air Offense Against Germany. New York: Holt.
- Cave, Hugh B. (1945). Wings across the World: The Story of Air Transport Command. New York: Dodd.

==== Kamikaze and suicide attacks ====
- Rikihei, Inoguchi; Tadashi, Nakajima; Pineau, Roger (1958). The Divine Wind: Japan's Kamikaze Force in World War II. New York: Ballantine Books.

==== Strategic bombing, general ====
- Biddle, Tami Davis (2002). Rhetoric and Reality in Air Warfare: The Evolution of British and American Ideas about Strategic Bombing, 1914–1945. Princeton, N.J.: Princeton Univ. Press.
- Bishop, Patrick (2008). Bomber Boys: Fighting Back, 1940–1945. London: Harper Perennial. ISBN 978-0-00-718986-1.
- Halpenny, Bruce Barrymore (2004). Bomber Aircrew in World War II: True Stories of Frontline Air Combat. Barnsley, Eng.: Pen & Sword Aviation.
- Halpenny, Bruce Barrymore (1984). To Shatter the Sky: Bomber Airfield at War. Cambridge: P. Stephens.
- Hartley, Arthur B. (1958). Unexploded Bomb: a History of Bomb Disposal. London: Cassell.
- O'Neill, Brian D. (1999). Half a Wing, Three Engines and a Prayer. New York: McGraw-Hill.

===== German strategic bombing of the United Kingdom =====
- Lee, Asher (1960). Blitz on Britain. London: Four Square.
- Mason, Francis K. (1969). Battle over Britain: a History of the German air assaults on Great Britain, 1917–18 and July–December 1940, and of the Development of Britain's air defences between the World Wars. London: McWhirter Twins.
- Richards, James M., ed. (1947). The Bombed Buildings of Britain: A Record of the Architectural Casualties. London: Architectural Press.
- Richards, William L. (1965). Pembrokeshire under fire: the story of the air-raids of 1940–41. Haverfordwest (Pembrokeshire): Hammond.
- Shipley, Paul; Rankin, Howard (1945). Bristol's bombed churches: a descriptive and pictorial record of their histories and destruction. Bristol: Rankin.
- Underdown, Thomas H. J. (1952). Bristol under blitz: the record of an ancient city and people during the battle of Britain, 1940–1. Bristol: Arrowsmith.

===== Western Allied strategic bombing of Germany and German-occupied Europe =====
- Frankland, Noble (1965). The bombing offensive against Germany: outlines and perspectives. London: Faber & Faber.
- ——— (1969). Bomber Offensive: the Devastation of Europe. New York: Ballantine.
- Friedrich, Jörg. (2008). The Fire: The Bombing of Germany, 1940–1945. New York: Columbia University Press. ISBN 978-0-231-13380-7.
- Middlebrook, Martin (2000). The Battle of Hamburg. London: Cassell.
- ——— (2000). The Berlin Raids. London: Cassell.
- ——— (1986). The Nuremberg Raid. London: Penguin.
- Overy, Richard (2014). The Bombers and the Bombed: Allied Air War over Europe, 1940–1945. New York: Viking.
- Taylor, Frederick (2004). Dresden: Tuesday, February 13, 1945. New York: HarperCollins.
- Webster, Charles; Frankland, Noble (1961). The Strategic Air Offensive against Germany, 1939–1945. Vol. 1–4. London: HMSO.

=== Land warfare ===
For the history of specific theaters or specific units, see the respective sections.

==== Airborne warfare and paratroopers ====
- Ayling, Keith (1944). They Fly to Fight: the Story of the Airborne Divisions. New York: Appleton.
- Brammall, Ronald (1965). The Tenth: a Record of Service of the 10th Battalion, the Parachute Regiment, 1942–1945, and the 10th Battalion, the Parachute Regiment (T.A.) (county of London), 1947–1965. Ipswich: Eastgate.
- Edwards, Roger (1974). German Airborne Troops, 1936–45. London: Macdonald & Janes.
- Gavin, James M. (1947). Airborne Warfare. Washington DC: Infantry Journal Press.
- Gregory, Barry (1974). British Airborne Troops. London: Macdonald & Janes.
- Huston, James A. (1972). Out of the Blue: U.S. Army Airborne Operations in World War II. Lafayette: Purdue University Studies.
- MacDonald, Charles B. (1969). By Air to Battle. New York: Ballantine.
- ——— (1970). Airborne. New York: Ballantine.
- Newnham, Maurice (1947). Prelude to Glory: the Story of the Creation of Britain's Parachute Army. London: Low.
- Norton, Geoffrey G. (1971). The Red Devils: the Story of the British Airborne Forces. London: Cooper.
- Sampson, Francis L. (1958). Look Out Below!: A Story of the Airborne by a Paratrooper Padre. Washington DC: Catholic University of America.
- Tugwell, Maurice (1971). Airborne to Battle: A History of Airborne Warfare, 1918–1971. Kimber.
- Warren, John C. (1955). Airborne Missions in the Mediterranean, 1942–1945. Washington DC: USAF Historical Division.
- ——— (1956). Airborne Operations in World War II, European Theatre. Washington DC: USAF Historical Division.
- Whiting, Charles (1974). Hunters from the Sky: The German Parachute Corps, 1941–1945. New York: Stein & Day.

==== Amphibious warfare and naval infantry ====
For histories of the United States Marine Corps, see the respective section under in the specific branches section.

- Burton, Earl (1944). By Sea and by Land: The Story of our Amphibious Forces. New York: McGraw-Hill.

==== Anti-aircraft warfare ====
- Watkins, J. H.; Leslie, Donald (1955). On Target: A Souvenir of 'Ack-Ack'. London: Territorial. – Released in 1955 upon the disbandment of the British Anti-Aircraft Command.

==== Armored cars ====
- Milsom, John; Chamberlain, Peter (1974). German Armoured Cars of Two World Wars. London: Arms & Armour.
- Warwick, Nigel W. M. (2014). In Every Place: The RAF Armoured Cars in the Middle East 1921–1953. Rushden: Forces & Corporate Publishing. ISBN 978-0-9574725-2-5.

==== Armored warfare and tank forces ====
- Battistelli, Pier Paolo (2007). Panzer Divisions: The Blitzkrieg Years 1939–40. Osprey Publishing. ISBN 978-1-84603-146-5.
- Bradford, George (1974). Armour Camouflage and Markings, North Africa 1940–1943. London: Arms & Armour.
- Crow, Duncan (1972). British and Commonwealth Armoured Formations (1919–46). Windsor (Berkshire): Profile.
- Martel, Giffard Le. Q. (1945). Our [British] Armoured Forces. London: Faber.
- Windrow, Martin (1982). The Panzer Divisions. Hippocrene Books. ISBN 0-88254-165-X.
- Zaloga, Steven J. (1995). Tank Battles of the Pacific War 1941–1945. Concord Publications.

==== Artillery ====
- Bidwell, Shelford (1970). Gunners at War: A Tactical Study of the Royal Artillery in the Twentieth Century. London: Arms & Armour.
- Duncan, William E.; et al., eds. (1950). The Royal Artillery Commemoration Book, 1939–1945. London: Bell.
- Hogg, Ian V. (1974). German Artillery of World War Two. London: Arms & Armour.
- McLean, Donald B., ed. (1973). Japanese Artillery: Weapons and Tactics. Wickenburg (Arizona): Normount Technical.

==== Military fortifications ====
- Kaufmann, J. E.; Jurga, Robert M. (1999). Fortress Europe, European Fortifications of World War II. London: Greenhill Books.

=== Naval warfare ===
==== General ====
- Campbell, John (1985). Naval Weapons of World War Two. Annapolis: Naval Institute Press.
- Faulkner, Marcus & Wilkinson, Peter (2012). War at Sea: A Naval Atlas, 1939–1945. Annapolis, Maryland: Naval Institute Press.
- Ireland, Bernard (1998). Jane's Naval History of World War II. New York: HarperCollins. ISBN 0-00-472143-8.
- Miller, Nathan (1995). War at Sea: A Naval History of World War II. New York: Oxford University Press.

==== Aircraft carriers ====
- Brown, David (1974). Carrier Operations in World War II. Vol. 1–2. London: Allan.
- Bryan, Joseph (1954). Aircraft Carrier. New York: Ballantine.
- Dildy, Douglas C. (2022). German and Italian Aircraft Carriers of World War II. Osprey Publishing. ISBN 978-1-4728-4677-8.
- Gilbert, Price (1946). The Escort Carriers in Action: The Story in Pictures of the Escort Carrier Force, U.S. Pacific Fleet, 1945, with a Supplement for the Flagship U.S.S. Makin Island. Atlanta, GA: Ruralist.
- Jensen, Oliver O. (1945). Carrier War. New York: Simon & Schuster.
- MacIntyre, Donald (1968). Aircraft Carriers. New York: Ballantine.
- Woolridge, E. T., ed. (1993). Carrier Warfare in the Pacific: An Oral History Collection. Washington D.C.: Smithsonian Institution Press.

==== Convoys ====
- Woodman, Richard (1996). Arctic Convoys 1941–1945. London: John Murray Publications.

==== Naval battles, Pacific (1941–1945) ====
- Cutler, Thomas J. (1994). The Battle of Leyte Gulf: 23–26 October 1944. New York: HarperCollins.
- Lindemann, Klaus (1982). Hailstorm Over Truk Lagoon. Singapore: Maruzen Asia.
- Parshall, Jonathan; Tully, Anthony (2005). Shattered Sword: The Untold Story of the Battle of Midway. Dulles, Virginia: Potomac Books.
- Prange, Gordon W. (1982). Miracle at Midway. McGraw-Hill.
- Symonds, Craig L. (2013). The Battle of Midway. Oxford and New York: Oxford University Press.

==== Submarine warfare ====
- Blair, Clay (1996). Hitler's U-Boat War: The Hunters, 1939–1942. New York: Random House.
- ——— (1998). Hitler's U-Boat War: The Hunted, 1942–1945. New York: Random House.
- ——— (1975). Silent Victory: The U.S. Submarine War Against Japan. New York: J. B. Lippincott & Co. ISBN 978-0-397-00753-0.
- Caulfield, Max (1958). A Night of Terror: The Story of the Athenia Affair. London: Muller. – About the sinking of SS Athenia by U30.
- Carpenter, Dorr; Polmar, Norman (1986). Submarines of the Imperial Japanese Navy. Annapolis: Naval Institute Press.
- Paterson, Lawrence (2022). The U-Boat War: A Global History, 1939–45. Osprey Publishing. ISBN 978-1-4728-4825-3.
- Roscoe, Theodore (1949). United States Submarine Operations in World War II. Annapolis: United States Naval Institute.

== Military history, by national militaries and national military branches ==
=== National militaries ===
==== Canada ====
- Hill, B. Kirkbride, ed. (1943). The price for freedom: a written and photographic record of over 500 of those who lost their lives in the Second World War while serving in the Armed Forces of Canada, Sept. 1939 to June 1942. Toronto: Ryerson.

==== Germany ====
- Mitcham, Samuel W. (1985). Hitler's Legions: The German Army Order of Battle, World War II. Stein & Days Publishing. ISBN 0-8128-2992-1.
- Jurado, Carlos Cabellero (1983). Foreign Volunteers of the Wehrmacht 1941–45. Osprey Military. ISBN 0-85045-524-3.
- Thomas, Nigel (1992). Wehrmacht Auxiliary Forces. Osprey Publishing. ISBN 978-1-85532-257-8.

==== Poland, whole military ====
- Zaloga, Steven J. (1982). The Polish Army 1939–45. Osprey Publishing. ISBN 0-85045-417-4.

==== Soviet Union, whole military ====
- Glantz, David M. (1998). Stumbling Colossus: The Red Army on the Eve of World War. Lawrence, Kansas: University Press of Kansas.
- ——— (2005). Colossus Reborn: The Red Army at War, 1941–1943. Lawrence: University Press of Kansas.
- Krivosheev, Grigori F. (1993). Soviet Casualties and Combat Losses in the Twentieth Century. Stackpole Books.

==== United Kingdom, whole military ====
- Joslen, H. F. (1960). Orders of Battle: U.K., and Colonial Formations and Units in the 2nd World War, 1939–1945. London: HMSO.

==== United States, whole military ====
- Wise, Terence (1973). American military camouflage and markings, 1939–1945. London: Almark.

=== Specific military branches ===
==== Australia, military branches ====
===== Australian Army =====
- Keogh, Eustace G. (1959). Middle East, 1939–1943. Melbourne: Wilkie.
- ——— (1965). South West Pacific, 1941–45. Melbourne: Grayflower.

===== Royal Australian Navy =====
- Feakes, Henry J. (1952). White Ensign, Southern Cross: A Story of the King's Ship of Australia's Navy. Sydney: Smith.
- Gill, George H. (1957). Royal Australian Navy. Canberra: Australian War Memorial.
- Jones, Thomas M.; Idriess, I. L. (1952). The Silent Service: Action Stories of the Anzac Navy. London: Angus & Robertson.
- Walker, Allan S.; et al. (1961). Medical Services of the R.A.N. and R.A.A.F. with Section on Women in the Army Medical Services. Canberra: Australian War Memorial.

===== Royal Australian Air Force =====
- Beede, John (1968). They hosed them out: a Story of Australian Gunners in the R.A.F. Sydney: Horwitz.
- Gillison, Douglas (1962). Royal Australian Air Force, 1939–1942. Canberra: Australian War Memorial.
- Herington, John (1954). Air War against Germany and Italy, 1939–1945. Canberra: Australian War Memorial.
- Odgers, George (1957). Air War against Japan, 1943–1945. Canberra: Australian War Memorial.
- Powell, George G. (1945). Two Steps to Tokyo: A Story of the R.A.A.F. in the Trobriand and Admiralty Islands. Melbourne: Oxford University Press.
- Walker, Allan S.; et al. (1961). Medical Services of the R.A.N. and R.A.A.F. with Section on Women in the Army Medical Services. Canberra: Australian War Memorial.
- Waters, John C. A. (1945). Valiant Youth: The Men of the R.A.A.F. Sydney: Johnston.

==== Belgium, military branches ====
===== Belgian Army =====
- Belgian-American Educational Foundation (1940). The Belgian campaign and the surrender of the Belgian Army, May 10–28, 1940. New York: Belgian-American Educational Foundation.

==== Canada, military branches ====
===== Canadian Army =====
- Burns, Eedson L. M. (1956). Manpower in the Canadian Army, 1939–1945. Toronto: Clarke, Irwin.
- ——— (1970). General Mud. Toronto: Clarke, Irwin.
- Cosgrove, Edmund (1970). The Evaders. Toronto: Clarke, Irwin.
- Londerville, J. D. (1950). The Pay Services of the Canadian Army overseas in the War of 1939–45. Ottawa: Runge.
- Munro, Ross (1945). Gauntlet to Overlord: the Story of the Canadian Army. Toronto: Macmillan.
- Stacey, Charles P., ed. (1945–1946). The Canadian Army at War. Vol. 1–3. King's Printer.
- ——— (1946). Canada's Battle in Normandy. Ottawa: King's Printer.
- ———, ed. (1957–1960). Official History of the Canadian Army in the Second World War. Vol. 1–3. King's Printer.
- Whitcombe, Fred, ed. (1947). The Pictorial History of Canada's Army overseas, 1939–1945. Toronto: McClelland.

===== Royal Canadian Air Force =====
- Cosgrove, Edmund (1965). Canada's fighting pilots. Toronto: Clarke, Irwin.
- Coughlin, Tom (1968). The Dangerous Sky: Canadian Airmen in World War II. London: Kimber.
- Griffin, D. F. (1944). First steps to Tokyo: the Royal Canadian Air Force in the Aleutians. New York: Dent.
- McMillan, Don A. (1944). Only the stars know. London: Dent.
- ——— (1949). The R.C.A.F. overseas: the fifth year. London: Dent.

===== Royal Canadian Navy =====
- Milne, Gilbert A. (1960). H.M.C.S. Toronto: T. Allen.
- Schull, Joseph (1952). The Far Distant Ships: an Official Account of Canadian Naval Operations in the Second World War. Ottawa: Cloutier.
- ——— (1963). Ships of the Great Days: Canada's Navy in World War II. London: Macmillan.

==== France, military branches ====
===== French Army =====
- Sumner, Ian (1998–2000). The French Army 1939–45. Vol. 1–2. Osprey Military. ISBN 1-85532-666-3.

==== Germany, military branches ====
===== German Air Force (Luftwaffe) =====
- Gurtner, René (August 1956). "Deutsche Luftwaffen-Felddivisionen im Weltkrieg 1939–1945" [German Luftwaffe Field Divisions in the World War 1939–1945]. Allgemeine schweizerische Militärzeitschrift (in German). 122 (8): 592–608.
- Williamson, Murray (1983). Strategy for Defeat: The Luftwaffe 1933–1945. Air University Press. ISBN 978-1-78625-770-3.

===== German Army (Heer) =====
- Chamberlain, Peter, ed. (1972). Encyclopedia of German Tanks of WW2. Bukupedia.

===== Waffen-SS =====
- Wagner, Bernd (1982). Hitlers Politische Soldaten: Die Waffen-SS 1933–1945. Leitbild, Struktur und Funktion einer nationalsozialistischen Elite [Hitler's Political Soldiers: The Waffen-SS 1933–1945. Mission Statement, Structure and Function of a National Socialist Elite] (in German). Ferdinand Schöningh. ISBN 978-3-506-76313-6.
- Windrow, Martin (1982). The Waffen-SS. Osprey Military. ISBN 0-85045-425-5.

==== Japan, military branches ====
===== Imperial Japanese Army =====
- Drea, Edward J. (2003). In the Service of the Emperor: Essays on the Imperial Japanese Army. Lincoln: University of Nebraska Press.

===== Imperial Japanese Navy =====
- Dull, Paul S. (1978). A Battle History of the Imperial Japanese Navy, 1941–1945. Annapolis, Maryland: Naval Institute Press. ISBN 0-87021-097-1.

==== New Zealand, military branches ====
===== Royal New Zealand Navy =====
- Jones, Thomas M.; Idriess, I. L. (1952). The Silent Service: Action Stories of the Anzac Navy. London: Angus & Robertson.

==== United Kingdom, military branches ====
===== British Army =====
- Barclay, Cyril N. (1964). On their shoulders: British generalship in the lean years, 1939–1942. London: Faber.
- Charteris, John (1945). The British Army today. New York: British Information Service.
- DeGuingand, Francis (1964). Generals at War. London: Hodder & Stoughton.
- Golding, Claud (1944). Footslogging it to Berlin: being a record of the valour of British Infantrymen in the present war. London: Blandford.
- Sheppard, Eric W.; Yeats-Brown, Francis C. C. (1941–1947). The Army: a complete record in text and pictures. Vol. 1–5. London: Hutchinson.
- Wilkinson, Frederick (1969). Badges of the British Army, 1820–1960. London: Arms & Armour.
- Yeats-Brown, Francis C. C. (1941). The Army from September 1939 to December 1940. London: Hutchinson.

===== Royal Navy =====
- Hodges, Peter (1973). Royal Navy warships camouflage, 1939–1945. London: Almark.
- Raven, Alan (1972). King George the Fifth class battleships. London: Bivouac.

===== Royal Air Force =====
- Goulding, James (1971). Camouflage and markings: R.A.F. Fighter Command, Northern Europe, 1936–1945. London: Ducimus.

==== United States, military branches ====
===== U.S. Army Air Forces =====
- Craven, Wesley Frank; Cate, James Lea, eds. (1948–1958). The Army Air Forces in World War II. Vol. 1–7. University of Chicago Press.

===== U.S. Army (without USAAF) =====
- Greenfield, Kent Roberts; et al., eds. (1946–1998). United States Army in World War II. Vol. 1–78. U.S. Army CMH.

===== U.S. Marine Corps =====
- Rottman, Gordon L. (2002). U.S. Marine Corps World War II Order of Battle: Ground and Air Units in the Pacific War, 1939–1945. Westport, Connecticut: Greenwood Press.

===== U.S. Navy =====
- Baer, George W. (1994). One Hundred Years of Seapower: The U.S. Navy, 1890–1990. Stanford, California: Stanford University Press.
- Morison, Samuel Eliot, ed. (1947–1962). History of United States Naval Operations in World War II. Vol. 1–15. Little, Brown and Company.

== Military history, war crimes ==
Works that are mainly concerned with war crimes trials and persecution of war criminals after the conclusion of the war should be placed in the appropriate list in the "Aftermath of World War" section.

=== Allied war crimes ===
==== American war crimes ====
- Lily, J. Robert (2007). Taken By Force: Rape and American GIs in Europe in World War II. London: Palgrave Macmillan.

==== Soviet war crimes ====
- Bartov, Omer (1986). The Eastern Front 1941–1945: The Barbarisation of Warfare. New York: St. Martin's Press.

=== Axis war crimes ===
==== Croatian war crimes ====
- Paris, Edmond (1962). Genocide in Satellite Croatia, 1941–1945: A Record of Racial and Religious Persecutions and Massacres. Chicago: American Institute for Balkan Affairs.

==== German war crimes ====
- Bartov, Omer (1986). The Eastern Front 1941–1945: The Barbarisation of Warfare. New York: St. Martin's Press.
- Davidowicz, Lucy S. (1975). The War Against the Jews 1933–1945. Open Road. ISBN 978-0-03-013661-0.
- Fritz, Stephen G. (2011). Ostkrieg: Hitler's War of Extermination in the East. Lexington: The University Press of Kentucky.
- Gallagher, Richard (1964). The Malmedy Massacre. New York: Paperback Library.
- Gutman, Yisrael (1994). Anatomy of the Auschwitz Death Camp. Indiana University Press. ISBN 0-253-32684-2.
- Heer, Hannes (1995). Vernichtungskrieg: Verbrechen der Wehrmacht [War of Annihilation: Wehrmacht Crimes] (in German). Zweitausendeins. ISBN 978-3-930908-04-2.
- Lifton, Robert Jay (1986). The Nazi Doctors: Medical Killing and the Psychology of Genocide. Basic Books.
- Megargee, Geoffrey P. (2006). War of Annihilation: Combat and Genocide on the Eastern Front, 1941. Lanham, Maryland: Rowman & Littlefield.
- Nałkowska, Zofia (1999). Medallions. Evanston, Ill.: Northwestern Univ. Press.
- Shepard, Ben (2005). After Daybreak: The Liberation of Belsen, 1945. Jonathan Cape. ISBN 978-0-224-07355-4.
- Svabe, Arveds (1952). Genocide in the Baltic States. Stockholm: Latvian National Funds in the Scandinavian Countries.
- Whiting, Charles (1971). Massacre at Malmedy: The Story of Jochen Peiper's Battle Group, Ardennes, December 1944. London: Cooper.

== Military history, occupation and occupied territories ==
- Connor, Sydney; Friedrich, Carl J. (1950). Military Government. Philadelphia: American Academy of Political and Social Science.
- Gulick, Luther H. (1959). Administrative Reflections from World War II. Alabama University Press.
- Taylor, Philip H.; Braibanti, Ralph (1948). Administration of Occupied Area: a Study Guide. Syracuse, NY: Syracuse University Press.

=== American occupation ===
Occupation after 1945 should be covered in the postwar section.

- Friedrich, Carl J. (1948). American Experiences in Military Government. New York: Rinehart.
- Holbjorn, Halo (1947). American Military Government: its Organization and Policies. Washington DC: Infantry Journal Press.
- Maginnis, John J. (1971). Military Government Journal: Normandy to Berlin. Amherst, MA: Massachusetts University Press.

==== American occupation of Italy until 1945 ====
- Harris, Charles R. S. (1958). Allied Military Administration of Italy, 1943–1945. HMSO.

=== British occupation ===
Occupation after 1945 should be covered in the postwar section.

- Donnison, Frank S. V. (1956). British Military Administration in the Far East, 1943–46. London: HMSO.
- Rennel, Francis J. (1948). British Military Administration of Occupied Territories in Africa during the Years 1941–1947. London: HMSO.

==== British occupation of Italy until 1945 ====
- Harris, Charles R. S. (1958). Allied Military Administration of Italy, 1943–1945. HMSO.

=== German occupation ===
- Blood, Phillip W. (2006). Hitler's Bandit Hunters: The SS and the Nazi Occupation of Europe. Dulles, Virginia: Potomac Books.
- Fritzsche, Peter (2016). An Iron Wind: Europe under Hitler. New York: Basic Books.
- Gregor, Neil, ed. (2008). Nazism, War and Genocide. Liverpool: Liverpool University Press.
- Hale, Christopher (2011). Hitler's Foreign Executioners: Europe's Dirty Secret. The History Press.
- Littlejohn, David (1972). The Patriotic Traitors: A History of Collaboration in German-Occupied Europe, 1940–45. London: Heinemann.
- Mazower, Mark (2008). Hitler's Empire: How the Nazis Ruled Europe. New York: Penguin. ISBN 978-1-59420-188-2.

==== German occupation of Belgium ====
- Goris, Johannes A., ed. (1943). Belgium in bondage. New York: Fischer.
- ———, ed. (1947). Belgium under occupation. New York: Fischer.
- Methuen, Paul A. (1952). Normandy Diary: Being a Record of Survivals and Losses of Historical Monuments in Northwest France, together with those of the Island of Walcheren and in that Part of Belgium traversed by the 21st Army Group in 1944–45. London: Hale.

==== German occupation of Denmark ====
- Petrow, Richard (1974). The Bitter Years: The Invasion and Occupation of Denmark and Norway, April 1940–May 1945. New York: Morrow. ISBN 978-0-688-00275-6.

==== German occupation of France ====
- Burrin, Philippe (1993). France under the Germans: Collaboration and Compromise. New York: New Press.
- Methuen, Paul A. (1952). Normandy Diary: Being a Record of Survivals and Losses of Historical Monuments in Northwest France, together with those of the Island of Walcheren and in that Part of Belgium traversed by the 21st Army Group in 1944–45. London: Hale.

==== German occupation of Italy ====
- Fasola, Cesare (1945). The Florence Galleries and the War: History and Records with a List of Missing Works of Art. Florence: Casa Editrice Monsalvato.
- Hartt, Frederick (1949). Florentine Art under Fire. Princeton, NJ: Princeton University Press.
- Jenkinson, Hilary; Bell, H. E. (1947). Italian Archives during the War and at its Close. London: HMSO.
- Lavagnino, Emilio (1947). Fifty War-Damaged Monuments of Italy. London: HMSO.

==== German occupation of Norway ====
- Petrow, Richard (1974). The Bitter Years: The Invasion and Occupation of Denmark and Norway, April 1940–May 1945. New York: Morrow. ISBN 978-0-688-00275-6.
- Stokker, Kathleen (1995). Folklore fights the Nazis: Humor in Occupied Norway, 1940–1945. University of Wisconsin Press. ISBN 0-299-15444-0.

==== German occupation of Poland ====
- Winstone, Martin (2015). The Dark Heart of Hitler's Europe: Nazi Rule in Poland under the General Government. New York: I. B. Tauris.

==== German occupation of the Soviet Union ====
- Berkhoff, Karel C. (2004). Harvest of Despair: Life and Death in Ukraine under Nazi Rule. Cambridge, Massachusetts: Harvard University Press.
- Dallin, Alexander (1981). German Rule in Russia 1941–1945. Boulder, Colorado: Westview.
- Shepherd, Ben (2004). War in the Wild East: The German Army and Soviet Partisans. Cambridge, Massachusetts: Harvard University Press.

==== German occupation of Yugoslavia ====
- Thomas, Nigel (1995). Axis Forces In Yugoslavia 1941–45. Osprey Publishing. ISBN 1-85532-473-3.

=== Japanese occupation ===
==== Japanese occupation of the Dutch East Indies (Indonesia) ====
- Benda, Harry J.; et al., eds. (1965). Japanese military administration in Indonesia. New Haven: Yale University Press.

== Military history, other ==
=== Colonial troops ===
- Salmon, E. Marling (1952). Beyond the Call of Duty: African Deeds of Bravery in Wartime. London: Macmillan.

==== United Kingdom, colonial troops ====
- Bent, Rowland A. R. (1952). Ten thousand men of Africa: the story of the Bechuanaland Pioneers and Gunners, 1941–1946. London: HMSO. – Bechuanaland Protectorate (Botswana) forces
- Gray, Brian (1953). Basuto Soldiers in Hitler's War. Maseru: Basutoland Government. – Basutoland (Lesotho)
- Jackson, Henry C. (1954). The Fighting Sudanese. London: Macmillan. – Anglo-Egyptian Sudan
- Schmitt, Deborah Ann (2005). The Bechuanaland Pioneers and Gunners. Praeger. ISBN 978-0-275-97905-8. – Bechuanaland Protectorate (Botswana) forces

=== Grand strategy ===
==== Allied grand strategy ====
- Ellis, John (1990). Brute Force: Allied Strategy and Tactics in the Second World War. London: Viking.
- Greenfield, Kent R. (1979). American Strategy in World War II: A Reconsideration. Westport, Connecticut: Greenwood Press.
- Miller, Edward S. (2007). War Plan Orange: The U.S. Strategy to Defeat Japan, 1897–1945. US Naval Institute Press. ISBN 978-1-59114-500-4.

==== Axis grand strategy ====
- Knox, MacGregor (1982). Mussolini Unleashed, 1939–1941: Politics and Strategy in Fascist Italy's Last War. Cambridge University Press. ISBN 0-521-33835-2.
- Mallmann, Klaus-Michael; Cüppers, Martin (2010). Nazi Palestine: The Plans for the Extermination of the Jews in Palestine. Translated by Smith, Krista. New York: Enigma.
- Paine, S. C. M. (2017). The Japanese Empire: Grand Strategy from the Meiji Restoration to the Pacific War. Cambridge University Press. ISBN 978-1-107-67616-9.

=== Insignia and military symbols ===
- Bowyer, Michael J. F. (1973). Bombing Colours: RAF bombers, their marking and operations, 1937–1973. Cambridge: Patrick Stephens.
- Cole, Howard N. (1946). Heraldry in War: Formation Badges, 1939–1945. Gale & Polden: Aldershot.
- Kerrigan, Evans E. (1967). American Badges and Insignia. New York: Viking.
- Rosignoli, Guido (1972). Army Badges and Insignia of World War 2: Great Britain, Poland, Belgium, Italy, U.S.S.R., U.S.A., Germany. London: Blandford.
- Wilkinson, Frederick (1969). Badges of the British Army, 1820–1960. London: Arms & Armour.

=== Prisoners of war ===
- Giertsen, Børre R., ed. (1946). Norsk fangeleksikon. Grinifangene [Norwegian Prison Encyclopedia, Grini detention camp] (in Norwegian). Oslo: J.W. Cappelens. OCLC 491707642.
- Krammer, Arnold (1996). Nazi Prisoners of War in America. Lanham, Maryland: Scarborough House.

=== Resistance ===
- Kochanski, Halik (2022). Resistance: The Underground War Against Hitler, 1939-1945. Liveright.

== National and regional histories of World War II ==
The following lists should include works focussed mainly on the history of a particular nation, state, or country during World War II. Histories of sovereign states as well as of colonial subjects and of cultural regions are of interest. Histories concerned with a particular theater of war should be placed in military history. For instance, a history of Poland during World War II should be placed in this section, but a history on 1939 invasion should be placed in the respective segment in the military history section.

=== Africa ===
Colonial names should be sorted alphabetically after their colonial name without colonial overlord identifiers. Colonial identifiers should be added with a comma, current countries names should be placed in brackets.

==== General ====
- Killingray, David (1986). Africa and the Second World War. St Martin's Press. ISBN 978-0-7110-2853-1.
- Salmon, E. Marling (1952). Beyond the Call of Duty: African Deeds of Bravery in Wartime. London: Macmillan.

==== Basutoland, British (Lesotho) ====
- Gray, Brian (1953). Basuto Soldiers in Hitler's War. Maseru: Basutoland Government.

==== Bechuanaland, British (Botswana) ====
- Bent, Rowland A. R. (1952). Ten thousand men of Africa: the story of the Bechuanaland Pioneers and Gunners, 1941–1946. London: HMSO.
- Schmitt, Deborah Ann (2005). The Bechuanaland Pioneers and Gunners. Praeger. ISBN 978-0-275-97905-8.

==== Ethiopia/Abyssinia ====
- Del Boca, Angelo (1969). The Ethiopian War, 1935–1941. Translated by Cummins, P. D. Chicago: University of Chicago Press.
- Dower, Kenneth C. G. (1949). Abyssinian Patchwork: an Anthology. Muller.
- Pankhurst, E. Sylvia; Pankhurst, Richard (1954). Ethiopia and Eritrea: the Last Phase of the Reunion Struggle, 1941–1952. Woodford Green (Essex): Lakilela.

==== North Africa, French (Morocco, Algeria, Tunisia) ====
- Goda, Norman J. W. (1998). Tomorrow the World: Hitler, Northwest Africa, and the Path toward America. College Station: Texas A&M University Press.

==== Northern Rhodesia, British (Zambia) ====
- Brelsford, William V., ed. (1954). The Story of the Northern Rhodesia Regiment. Lusaka: Government Printer.

==== South Africa ====
- Tinley, James M. (1954). South African Food and Agriculture in World War II. Stanford, CA: Stanford University Press.

=== Asia ===
Note that the Middle East has its own section.

==== China ====
- Brook, Timothy (2005). Collaboration: Japanese Agents and Local Elites in Wartime China. Cambridge, Massachusetts: Harvard Univ. Press.
- Hsiung, James C.; Levine, Steven I. (1992). China's Bitter Victory: The War With Japan, 1937–1945. Armonk, New York: M. E. Sharpe.
- Liu, Xiaoyuan (1996). A Partnership for Disorder: China, the United States, and Their Policies for the Postwar Disposition of the Japanese Empire, 1941–1945. Cambridge, UK: Cambridge University Press.
- Mitter, Rana (2013). Forgotten Ally: China's World War II, 1937–1945. Boston: Houghton Mifflin Harcourt.
- Peattie, Mark; Drea, Edward; Ven, Hans Van De, eds. (2011). The Battle for China: Essays on the Military History of the Sino-Japanese War of 1937–1945. Stanford, California: Stanford University Press.
- Plating, John D. (2011). The Hump: America's Strategy for Keeping China in World War II. College Station: Texas A&M University Press.
- Sih, Paul K. T., ed. (1977). Nationalist China during the Sino-Japanese War, 1937–1945. Hicksville, New York: Exposition Press.
- Taylor, Jay (2009). The Generalissimo: Chiang Kai-shek and the Struggle for Modern China. Cambridge, Massachusetts: Harvard University Press.
- Tuchman, Barbara (1972). Stilwell and the American Experience in China: 1911–1945. New York: Bantam.
- History of the Sino-Japanese War, 1937–1945. Translated by Ha-hsiung, Wen. Tapei: Chung Wu Publishing Co. 1971.
- Yamaguchi, Noburu (2012). "An Unexpected Encounter with Hybrid Warfare: The Japanese Experience in North China, 1937–1945". In Murray, Williamson; Mansoor, Peter R. (eds.). Hybrid Warfare: Fighting Complex Opponents from the Ancient World to the Present. Cambridge and New York: Cambridge University Press.

==== India, British ====
- Tomlinson, Brian R. (1979). Political Economy of the Raj 1914–1947: The Economics of Decolonization in India. Macmillan. ISBN 0-333-22361-6.

==== Indochina, French (Vietnam, Cambodia, Laos) ====
- Bartholomew-Feis, Dixee R. (2006). The OSS and Ho Chi Minh: Unexpected Allies in the War against Japan. Lawrence: University Press of Kansas.

==== Iraq ====
- Silverfarb, Daniel (1986). Britain's Informal Empire in the Middle East: A Case Study of Iraq 1929–1941. Oxford University Press. ISBN 0-19-503997-1.
- Tarbush, Mohammed (1982). The Role of the Military in Politics: A Case Study of Iraq to 1941. Routledge. ISBN 978-1-138-92582-3.

==== Japan ====
- Allen, Louis (1971). "Notes on Japanese Historiography: World War II". Military Affairs. 35 (4): 133–138. doi:10.2307/1984792. JSTOR 1984792.
- Barnhart, Michael A. (1987). Japan Prepares for Total War: The Search for Economic Security, 1919–1941. Cornell University Press. ISBN 978-0-8014-9529-8.
- Carpenter, Dorr; Polmar, Norman (1986). Submarines of the Imperial Japanese Navy. Annapolis: Naval Institute Press.
- Cohen, Jerome B. (1949). Japan's Economy in War and Reconstruction. Minneapolis: University of Minnesota Press.
- Cook, Haruko Taya; Cook, Theodore F., eds. (1992). Japan at War: An Oral History. New York: New Press. ISBN 978-1-56584-039-3.
- Deacon, Richard (1982). A History of the Japanese Secret Service. London: Fredrick Muller.
- Drea, Edward J. (2009). Japan's Imperial Army: Its Rise and Fall, 1853–1945. Lawrence, Kansas: University Press of Kansas.
- Dull, Paul S. (1978). A Battle History of the Imperial Japanese Navy, 1941–1945. Annapolis, Maryland: Naval Institute Press. ISBN 0-87021-097-1.
- Duus, Peter; Myers, Ramon H.; Peattie, Mark R., eds. (1996). The Japanese Wartime Empire, 1931–1945. Princeton, New Jersey: Princeton University Press.
- Goldstein, D. M.; Dillon, K. V., eds. (2004). The Pacific War Papers: Japanese Documents of World War II. Dulles, Virginia: Brasseys.
- Gruhl, Werner (2007). Imperial Japan's World War Two, 1931–1945. New Brunswick, New Jersey: Transaction Publishers.
- Harries, Meirion; Harries, Susie (1994). Soldiers of the Sun: The Rise and Fall of the Imperial Japanese Army. New York: Random House.
- Hayashi, Saburo and Alvin D. Coox. (1978). Kogun: The Japanese Army in the Pacific War. Westport, Conn.: Greenwood Press.
- Hotta, E (2007). Pan-Asianism and Japan's War, 1931–1945. New York: Palgrave Macmillan.
- Ienaga, Saburō (1978). The Pacific War, 1931–1945: A Critical Perspective on Japan's Role in World War II. New York: Pantheon.
- Ike, Nobutaka, ed. (1967). Japan's Decision for War: Records of the 1941 Policy Conferences. Stanford, California: Stanford University Press.
- Jones, Francis Clifford (1954). Japan's New Order in East Asia: Its Rise and Fall. London: Oxford University Press.
- Koshiro, Yukiko (2001). "Japan's World and World War II". Diplomatic History. 25 (3): 425–441. doi:10.1111/0145-2096.00276. JSTOR 24914126.
- ——— (2004). "Eurasian eclipse: Japan's end game in World War II". American Historical Review. 109 (2): 417–444. doi:10.1086/530338. JSTOR 10.1086/530338.
- ——— (2013). Imperial Eclipse: Japan's Strategic Thinking about Continental Asia before August 1945. Cornell University Press.
- Rikihei, Inoguchi; Tadashi, Nakajima; Pineau, Roger (1958). The Divine Wind: Japan's Kamikaze Force in World War II. New York: Ballantine Books.
- Storry, George Richard (1979). Japan and the Decline of the West in Asia 1894–1943. London: Longman.
- Utley, Jonathan G. (2005). Going to War with Japan 1937–1941. New York: Fordham University Press.
- Willmott, H. P. (1982). Empires in the Balance: Japanese and Allied Pacific Strategies to April 1942. Annapolis, Maryland: Naval Institute Press.
- ——— (2008). The Barrier and the Javelin: Japanese and Allied Strategies February to June 1942. Annapolis, Maryland: Naval Institute Press.

==== Thailand ====
- Aldrich, Richard J. (1993). The Key to the South: Britain, the United States, and Thailand during the Approach of the Pacific War, 1929–1942. New York: Oxford University Press.
- Reynolds, E. Bruce (2005). Thailand's Secret War: The Free Thais, OSS, and SOE during World War II. Cambridge, UK: Cambridge University Press.

=== The Americas ===
==== Argentina ====
- Francis, Michael J. (1977). The Limits of Hegemony: United States Relations with Argentina and Chile during World War II. Notre Dame, Indiana: Notre Dame University Press.
- Frank, Gary (1979). Struggle for Hegemony in South America: Argentina, Brazil, and the United States during the Second World War. Miami: University of Miami Press.
- Newton, Ronald C. (1992). The "Nazi Menace" in Argentina, 1931–1947. Stanford, California: Stanford University Press.

==== Brazil ====
- Frank, Gary (1979). Struggle for Hegemony in South America: Argentina, Brazil, and the United States during the Second World War. Miami: University of Miami Press.
- McCann, Frank D. Jr. (1973). The Brazilian-American Alliance, 1937–1945. Princeton, New Jersey: Princeton University Press.

==== Canada ====
- Armstrong, Elizabeth H. (1942). French Canadian opinion on the war, January, 1940 – June, 1941. Toronto: Hyerson.
- Britnell, George; Fowke, Vernon C. (1962). Canadian Agriculture in War and Peace. Stanford, CA: Stanford University Press.
- Dawson, Robert M. (1961). The Conscription Crisis of 1944. Toronto: Toronto University Press.
- Dziuban, Stanley W. (1959). Military relations between the United States and Canada, 1939–1945. Washington DC: U.S. Department of the Army.
- Engen, Robert (2009). Canadians Under Fire: Infantry Effectiveness in the Second World War. Montreal: MQUP.
- Feasby, W. R., ed. (1953–1956). Official History of the Canadian Medical Services, 1939–1945. Vol. 1–2. Ottawa: Queen's Printer.
- Granatstein, Jack L. (1969). Conscription in the Second World War, 1939–1945: a Study in Political Management. Toronto: Ryerson.
- Kennedy, John de N. (1950). History of the Department of Munitions and Supply: Canada in the Second World War. Ottawa: King's Printer.
- King, William L. M. (1941). Canada at Britain's side. London: Macmillan.
- ——— (1945). Canada and the Fight for Freedom. New York: Duell.
- LaVoilette, Forrest E. (1948). Canadian Japanese and World War II: a sociological and psychological account. Toronto: Toronto University Press.
- Malone, Richard S. (1946). Missing from the Record. Toronto: Collins.
- Pickersgill, J. W. (1960). The Mackenzie King record. Toronto: Toronto University Press.

==== Chile ====
- Francis, Michael J. (1977). The Limits of Hegemony: United States Relations with Argentina and Chile during World War II. Notre Dame, Indiana: Notre Dame University Press.

==== United States ====
- Abrahamson, James L. (1983). The American Homefront: Revolutionary War, Civil War, World War I, World War II. National Defense University Press.
- Adams, Michael C.C. (1993). The Best War Ever: America and World War II. Baltimore: Johns Hopkins Univ. Press.
- Andrade, Dale (1996). Luzon: The United States Army Campaigns of World War II. Washington, D.C.: Government Printing Office.
- Baer, George W. (1994). One Hundred Years of Seapower: The U.S. Navy, 1890–1990. Stanford, California: Stanford University Press.
- Bentley, Amy (1998). Eating for Victory: Food Rationing and the Politics of Domesticity. Urbana: University of Illinois Press.
- Bernstein, Alison R. (1991). American Indians and World War II. Norman: University of Oklahoma Press.
- Binns, Stewart; Wood, Adrian (2001). America at War in Color: Unique Images of the American Experience of World War II. London: Carlton. ISBN 978-1-84222-349-9. OCLC 47992974.
- Blum, John Morton (1976). V was for Victory: Politics and American Culture During World War II. New York: Harcourt Brace.
- Breitman, Richard; Goda, Norman J. W.; Naftali, Timothy; Wolfe, Robert (2005). U.S. Intelligence and the Nazis. Cambridge, UK: Cambridge University Press. doi:10.1017/CBO9780511618178. ISBN 978-0-521-61794-9.
- Campbell, D'Ann. (1984). Women at War with America: Private Lives in a Patriotic Era. Cambridge, Massachusetts: Harvard University Press.
- Clay, Blair Jr. (2001). Silent Victory: The U.S. Submarine War against Japan. Annapolis, Maryland: United States Naval Institute.
- Cole, Wayne S. (1957). "American Entry into World War II: A Historiographical Appraisal". Mississippi Valley Historical Review. 43 (4): 595–617. doi:10.2307/1902275. JSTOR 1902275.
- Cooke, Alistair (2006). The American Home Front, 1941–1942. New York: Atlantic Monthly Press.
- Crane, Conrad C. (1993). Bombs, Cities, and Civilians: American Airpower Strategy in World War II. Lawrence: University Press of Kansas.
- Dallek, Robert (1995). Franklin D. Roosevelt and American Foreign Policy, 1932–1945. NY: Oxford University Press.
- Doenecke, Justus D. (1979). "Beyond Polemics: An Historiographical Re-Appraisal of American Entry into World War II". History Teacher. 12 (2): 217–251. doi:10.2307/491983. JSTOR 491983.
- Doherty, Thomas (1993). Projections of War: Hollywood, American Culture and World War II. New York: Columbia University Press.
- Dziuban, Stanley W. (1959). Military relations between the United States and Canada, 1939–1945. Washington DC: U.S. Department of the Army.
- Erenberg, Lewis A.; Hirsch, Susan E., eds. (1996). The War in American Culture: Society and Consciousness during World War II. Chicago: University of Chicago Press.
- Francis, Michael J. (1977). The Limits of Hegemony: United States Relations with Argentina and Chile during World War II. Notre Dame, Indiana: Notre Dame University Press.
- Frank, Gary (1979). Struggle for Hegemony in South America: Argentina, Brazil, and the United States during the Second World War. Miami: University of Miami Press.
- Friedrich, Carl J. (1948). American Experiences in Military Government. New York: Rinehart.
- Greenfield, Kent R. (1979). American Strategy in World War II: A Reconsideration. Westport, Connecticut: Greenwood Press.
- Hassel, Agostino von; MacRae, Sigrid; Amerskamp, Simone (2006). Alliance of Enemies: The Untold Story of the Secret American and German Collaboration to End World War II. New York: Thomas Dunne. ISBN 978-0-312-32369-1.
- Hearden, Patrick J. (1987). Roosevelt confronts Hitler: America's Entry into World War II. Northern Illinois University Press. ISBN 0-87580-124-2.
- Henderson, Aileen Kilgore (2001). Stateside Soldier: Life in the Women's Army Corps. Columbia, South Carolina: University of South Carolina Press.
- Herman, Arthur (2012). Freedom's Forge: How American Business Produced Victory in World War II. New York: Random House.
- Holm, Jeanne M., ed. (1998). In Defense of a Nation: Servicewomen in World War II. Arlington, Va.: Vandamere Press.
- Jeffries, John W. (1996). Wartime America: The World War II Homefront. Chicago: I.R. Dee.
- Jones, John B. (2006). The Songs That Fought the War: Popular Music and the Home Front, 1939–1945. Waltham, Massachusetts: Brandeis University Press.
- Jordan, Jonathan W. (2015). American Warlords: How Roosevelt's High Command Led America to Victory in World War II. New York: NAL Caliber.
- Kennedy, David M. (1999). Freedom From Fear: The American People in Depression and War, 1929–1945. Oxford: Oxford Univ. Press.
- Kennedy, Paul (2013). Engineers of Victory: The Problem Solvers Who Turned the Tide in the Second World War.
- Kennedy, Thomas C. (1963). "Charles A. Beard and the "Court Historians"". Historian. 25 (4): 439–450. doi:10.1111/j.1540-6563.1963.tb00227.x. JSTOR 24442426.
- Kennett, Lee (1987). G.I.: The American Soldier in World War II. New York: Schribner.
- Krammer, Arnold (1996). Nazi Prisoners of War in America. Lanham, Maryland: Scarborough House.
- Kühl, Stefan (2002). The Nazi Connection: Eugenics, American Racism, and German National Socialism. New York: Oxford University Press.
- Lily, J. Robert (2007). Taken By Force: Rape and American GIs in Europe in World War II. London: Palgrave Macmillan.
- Linderman, Gerald F. (1997). The World within War: America's Combat Experience in World War II. New York: Free Press. ISBN 978-0-684-82797-1.
- Litoff, Judy Barett; Smith, David C., eds. (1994). We're in this War Too: World War II Letters from Women in Uniform. New York: Oxford University Press.
- Malkin, Michelle (2004). In Defense of Internment: The Case for 'Racial Profiling' in World War II and the War on Terror. Washington, D.C.: Regnery Publishing.
- Miller, Donald L. (2006). Masters of the Air: America's Bomber Boys Who Fought the Air War against Nazi Germany. New York: Simon & Schuster.
- Minear, Richard H. (1996). Dr. Seuss Goes to War: The World War II Editorial Cartoons of Theodor Seuss Geisel. New York: New Press.
- Morison, Samuel Eliot (1963). The Two-Ocean War. Boston: Little, Brown & Co.
- Motley, Mary Penick (1975). The Invisible Soldier: The Experience of the Black Soldiers in World War II. Detroit: Wayne State University press. ISBN 978-0-8143-1550-7.
- Okihiro, Gary Y. (1996). Whispered Silences: Japanese Americans and World War II. Seattle: University of Washington Press.
- O'Neill, William L. (1993). A Democracy at War: America's Fight at Home and Abroad in World War II. New York: Free Press.
- Province, Charles M. (1991). Patton's Third Army: A Chronicle of the Third Army Advance, August, 1944 to May, 1945. New York: Hippocrene Books.
- Samuel, Lawrence R. (1996). Pledging Allegiance: American Identity and the Bond Drive of World War II. Washington, D.C.: Smithsonian Institution Press. ISBN 978-1-56098-707-9.
- Stoler, Mark A. (2000). Allies and Adversaries: The Joint Chiefs of Staff, the Grand Alliance and U.S. Strategy in World War II. Chapel Hill: University of North Carolina Press.
- Terkel, Studs (1984). "The Good War": An Oral History of World War Two. New York: Pantheon. ISBN 978-0-394-53103-8.
- Roscoe, Theodore (1949). United States Submarine Operations in World War II. Annapolis: United States Naval Institute.
- Weigley, Russell (1974). Eisenhower's Lieutenants. Bloomington: Indiana Univ. Press.

=== Europe ===
==== Austria ====
Austria was part of Germany between 1938 and 1945 (see: Anschluss). This section contains books relevant specifically to that segment of the German Reich in the timeframe or to the postwar Republic of Austria in its relationship to World War II.

- Art, David (2006). The Politics of the Nazi Past in Germany and Austria. Cambridge University Press. ISBN 978-0-521-85683-6.
- Pauley, Bruce F. (2000). From Prejudice to Persecution: A History of Austrian Anti-Semitism. University of North Carolina Press. ISBN 978-0-8078-6376-3.
- Steininger, Wolf (2008). Austria, Germany, and the Cold War: from the Anschluss to the State Treaty 1938–1955. New York: Berghahn Books. ISBN 978-1-84545-326-8.

==== Belgium ====
- Belgian-American Educational Foundation (1940). The Belgian campaign and the surrender of the Belgian Army, May 10–28, 1940. New York: Belgian-American Educational Foundation.
- Goris, Johannes A., ed. (1943). Belgium in bondage. New York: Fischer.
- ———, ed. (1947). Belgium under occupation. New York: Fischer.

==== Bulgaria ====
- Miller, Marshall Lee (1975). Bulgaria during the Second World War. Stanford University Press. ISBN 0-8047-0870-3.
- Rachev, Stoyan (1981). Anglo-Bulgarian Relations during the Second World War, 1939–1944. Translated by Kostov, Stefan. Sofia, Bulgaria: Sofia.

==== Croatia ====
- Paris, Edmond (1962). Genocide in Satellite Croatia, 1941–1945: A Record of Racial and Religious Persecutions and Massacres. Chicago: American Institute for Balkan Affairs.
- Ramet, Sabrina P., ed. (2007). The Independent State of Croatia, 1941–45. London: Routledge.

==== Denmark ====
- Petrow, Richard (1974). The Bitter Years: The Invasion and Occupation of Denmark and Norway, April 1940–May 1945. New York: Morrow. ISBN 978-0-688-00275-6.

==== Estonia ====
- Corum, James S.; et al., eds. (2014). The Second World War and the Baltic States. Frankfurt am Main: Peter Lang GmbH, Internationaler Verlag der Wissenschaften.
- Svabe, Arveds (1952). Genocide in the Baltic States. Stockholm: Latvian National Funds in the Scandinavian Countries.

==== Finland ====
- Berry, R. Michael (1987). American Foreign Policy and the Finnish Exception: Ideological Preferences and Wartime Realities. Helsinki: Finnish Historical Society.
- Krosby, H. Peter (1968). Finland, Germany, and the Soviet Union, 1940–1941: The Petsamo Dispute. Madison: University of Wisconsin Press. ISBN 978-0-299-05140-2.
- Lunde, Henrik O. (2011). Finland's War of Choice: The Troubled German-Finnish Coalition in World War II. Havertown, Pennsylvania: Casemate.
- Lundin, Charles Leonard (1957). Finland in the Second World War. Bloomington, Indiana: Indiana University Press.
- Menger, M (1988). Deutschland und Finnland im Zweiten Weltkrieg. Berlin: Militärverlag.
- Vehviläinen, Olli (2002). Finland in the Second World War: Between Germany and Russia. Gordonsville: Palgrave Macmillan.

==== France ====
- Amouroux, Henri (1976–1993). La Grande Histoire des Français sous l'Occupation [The Grand History of the French Under Occupation] (in French). Vol. 10 volumes. Paris: R. Laffont.
- Aron, Robert (1964). France Reborn: The History of the Liberation, June 1944-May 1945. New York: C. Scribner's Sons.
- Bloch, Marc (1968). Strange Defeat: A Statement of Evidence Written in 1940. W. W. Norton & Company.
- Davies, Peter (2001). France and the Second World War: Occupation, Collaboration, and Resistance. London: Routledge.
- Smith, Colin (2009). England's Last War against France: Fighting Vichy 1940–1942. London: Weidenfeld and Nicolson.
- Thomas, R. T. (1979). Britain and Vichy: The Dilemma of Anglo-French Relations, 1940–42. New York: St. Martin's.
- Young, Robert J. (1996). France and the Origins of the Second World War. Palgrave Macmillan. ISBN 978-1-349-24890-2.

==== Germany ====
For books specifically about German-owned Austria between 1938 and 1945, see the "Austria" section.

- Burdick, Charles B. (1968). Germany's Military Strategy and Spain in World War II. Syracuse, New York: Syracuse University Press.
- Carter, Carolle J. (1977). The Shamrock and the Swastika: German Espionage in Ireland in World War II. Palo Alto, California: Pacific Books. ISBN 0-87015-221-1.
- DiNardo, Richard (2005). Germany and the Axis Powers: From Coalition to Collapse. Lawrence: University Press of Kansas.
- Hitler, Adolf (1964). Trevor-Roper, Hugh (ed.). Hitler's War Directives, 1939–1945. Sidgwick and Jackson.
- Military History Research Office (1979–2008). Das Deutsche Reich und der Zweite Weltkrieg [The German Reich and the Second World War] (in German). Vol. 1–13. Stuttgart: Deutsche Verlags-Anstalt.
- Leitz, Christian (2000). Nazi Germany and Neutral Europe during the Second World War. Manchester, UK: Manchester University Press.
- Shirer, William L. (1960). The Rise and Fall of the Third Reich: A History of Nazi Germany. Simon & Schuster. LCCN 60-6729.

==== Hungary ====
- Cornelius, Deborah S. (2011). Hungary in World War II: Caught in the Cauldron. New York: Fordham University Press.
- Dreisziger, Nandor F., ed. (1983). Hungary and the Second World War. Toronto: University of Toronto Press.
- Fenyo, Mario D. (1972). Hitler, Horthy, and Hungary: German-Hungarian Relations, 1941–1944. New Haven, Connecticut: Yale University Press.
- Macartney, Carlile A. (1956–1957). October Fifteenth: A History of Modern Hungary 1929–1945. Edinburgh: University Press.

==== Ireland ====
- Carter, Carolle J. (1977). The Shamrock and the Swastika: German Espionage in Ireland in World War II. Palo Alto, California: Pacific Books. ISBN 0-87015-221-1.
- Duggan, John P. (1985). Neutral Ireland and the Third Reich. Dublin, Ireland: Gill and Macmillan.
- Dwyer, T. Ryle (2009). Behind the Green Curtain: Ireland's Phoney Neutrality during World War II. Dublin, Ireland: Gill and Macmillan.
- Fisk, Robert (1983). In Time of War: Ireland, Ulster, and the Price of Neutrality, 1939–1945. Philadelphia: University of Pennsylvania Press. ISBN 978-0-8122-7888-0.

==== Italy (Kingdom) ====
- Knox, MacGregor (1982). Mussolini Unleashed, 1939–1941: Politics and Strategy in Fascist Italy's Last War. Cambridge University Press. ISBN 0-521-33835-2.
- Knox, MacGregor (2000). Hitler's Italian Allies: Royal Armed Forces, Fascist Regime, and the War of 1940–1943. Cambridge, UK: Cambridge University Press. ISBN 978-0-521-79047-5.
- Morgan, Philip (2007). The Fall of Mussolini: Italy, the Italians, and the Second World War. Oxford and New York: Oxford University Press. ISBN 978-0-19-280247-7.

==== Latvia ====
- Corum, James S.; et al., eds. (2014). The Second World War and the Baltic States. Frankfurt am Main: Peter Lang GmbH, Internationaler Verlag der Wissenschaften.
- Svabe, Arveds (1952). Genocide in the Baltic States. Stockholm: Latvian National Funds in the Scandinavian Countries.

==== Lithuania ====
- Corum, James S.; et al., eds. (2014). The Second World War and the Baltic States. Frankfurt am Main: Peter Lang GmbH, Internationaler Verlag der Wissenschaften.
- Svabe, Arveds (1952). Genocide in the Baltic States. Stockholm: Latvian National Funds in the Scandinavian Countries.

==== Netherlands ====
- De Jong, Loe (1969–1991). The Kingdom of the Netherlands During World War II. Vol. 1–14. Amsterdam: Dutch Institute for War Documentation.

==== Norway ====
- Petrow, Richard (1974). The Bitter Years: The Invasion and Occupation of Denmark and Norway, April 1940–May 1945. New York: Morrow. ISBN 978-0-688-00275-6.

==== Poland ====
- Garliriski, Jozef (1985). Poland in the Second World War. New York: Hippocrene.
- Kochanski, Halik (2014). The Eagle Unbowed: Poland and the Poles in the Second World War. Cambridge, Massachusetts: Harvard University Press.
- Lukas, Richard C. (1978). The Strange Allies: The United States and Poland, 1941–1945. Knoxville: University of Tennessee Press. ISBN 978-0-87049-229-7.
- Nałkowska, Zofia (1999). Medallions. Evanston, Ill.: Northwestern Univ. Press.
- Prażmovska, Anita J. (1995). Britain and Poland 1939–1943: The Betrayed Ally. Cambridge, UK: Cambridge University Press.
- Terry, Sarah Meiklejohn (1983). Poland's Place in Europe: General Sikorski and the Origin of the Oder-Neisse Line, 1939–1943. Princeton, New Jersey: Princeton University Press.

==== Portugal ====
- Vintras, Roland E. (1974). The Portuguese Connection: The Secret History of the Azores Base. London: Bachman and Turner.
- Weber, Ronald (2011). The Lisbon Route: Entry and Escape in Nazi Europe. Lanham, Maryland: Ivan R. Dee.
- Weiss, Kenneth G. (1980). The Azores in Diplomacy and Strategy, 1940–1945. Alexandria, Virginia: Institute of Naval Studies, Center for Naval Analysis.

==== Romania ====
- Axworthy, Mark; Scafes, Cornel I.; Crăciunoiu, Cristian (1995). Third Axis, Fourth Ally: Romanian Armed Forces in the European War, 1941–1945. London: Arms and Armour.
- Deletant, Dennis (2006). Hitler's Forgotten Ally: Ion Antonescu and His Regime, Romania 1940–1944. New York: Palgrave Macmillan.
- Giurescu, Dinu C. (2000). Romania in the Second World War, 1939–1945. Boulder, Colorado: East European Monographs.
- Glantz, David M. (2007). Red Storm over the Balkans: The Failed Soviet Invasion of Romania, Spring 1944. Lawrence: University Press of Kansas.

==== Soviet Union ====
- Andreyev, Catherine (1987). Vlasov and the Russian Liberation Movement, Soviet Reality and Emigré Theories. Cambridge: Cambridge Univ. Press.
- Applebaum, Anne (2003). Gulag: A History of the Soviet Camps. New York: Doubleday.
- Armstrong, Richard N. (2008). Soviet Operational Deception: The Red Cloak. Fort Leavenworth, Kansas: U.S. Army Command and General Staff College.
- Bacon, Edwin (1994). The Gulag at War: Stalin's Forced Labour System in Light of the Archives. New York: New York Univ. Press.
- Barber, John and Mark Harrison. (1991). The Soviet Home Front, 1941–1945: A Social and Economic History of the USSR in World War II. London: Longman.
- Bellamy, Chris (2007). Absolute War: Soviet Russia in the Second World War. New York: Alfred A. Knopf.
- Davies, R. W. (1998). Soviet economic development from Lenin to Khrushchev. Cambridge University Press. ISBN 978-0-521-62260-8.
- Dunn, Walter S. (2006). Stalin's Keys to Victory: The Rebirth of the Red Army. Westport, Connecticut: Praeger Security International.
- Ellis, Frank (2011). The Damned and the Dead: The Eastern Front through the Eyes of Soviet and Russian Novelists. Lawrence: University Press of Kansas.
- Glantz, David M. (1998). Stumbling Colossus: The Red Army on the Eve of World War. Lawrence, Kansas: University Press of Kansas.
- Glantz, David M. (2005). Colossus Reborn: The Red Army at War, 1941–1943. Lawrence: University Press of Kansas.
- Gorbachevsky, Boris (2008). Through the Maelstrom: A Red Army Soldier's War on the Eastern Front, 1942–1945. Lawrence: University Press of Kansas.
- Gordin, I., ed. (2005). Nasha voina [Our War] (in Russian). Saint Petersburg: Izd-vo zhurnala "Zvezda".
- Gorodetsky, Gabriel (1999). The Grand Delusion: Stalin and the German Invasion of Russia. New Haven, Connecticut: Yale University Press.
- Haslam, Jonathan (1984). The Soviet Union and the Struggle for Collective Security in Europe: 1933–39. Springer. ISBN 978-1-349-17601-4.
- Hill, Alexander (2017). The Red Army and the Second World War. Cambridge, UK: Cambridge University Press.
- Hill, Alexander (2005). The War Behind the Eastern Front: The Soviet Partisan Movement in North-West Russia, 1941–1944. Abingdon, Oxon: Frank Cass.
- Krivosheev, G. F., ed. (1997). Soviet Casualties and Combat Losses in the Twentieth Century. London: Greenhill.
- Krylova, Anna (2010). Soviet Women in Combat: A History of Violence on the Eastern Front. Cambridge, UK: Cambridge University Press.
- McMeekin, Sean (2021). Stalin's War: A New History of World War II. New York: Basic Books.
- Merridale, Catherine (2006). Ivan's War: Life and Death in the Red Army, 1939–1945. New York: Picador.
- Miner, Steven Merritt (2003). Stalin's Holy War: Religion, Nationalism, and Alliance Politics, 1941–1945. Chapel Hill: University of North Carolina Press.
- Overy, Richard (1998). Russia's War: A History of the Soviet Effort: 1941–1945. New York: Penguin Books.
- Overy, Richard (2006). The Dictators: Hitler's Germany, Stalin's Russia. New York: W. W. Norton & Company.
- Parrish, Michael (1996). The Lesser Terror: Soviet State Security, 1939–1953. Westport, Connecticut: Praeger.
- Reese, Roger R. (1996). Stalin's Reluctant Soldiers: A Social History of the Red Army 1925–1941. Lawrence: University Press of Kansas.
- Reese, Roger R. (2011). Why Stalin's Soldiers Fought: The Red Army's Military Effectiveness in World War II. Lawrence: University Press of Kansas.
- Seaton, Albert (1976). Stalin as Warlord. London: Batsford. ISBN 978-0-7134-3078-3.
- Shukman, Harold, ed. (1993). Stalin's Generals. London: Weidenfeld & Nicolson.
- Snyder, Timothy (2010). Bloodlands: Europe between Hitler and Stalin. New York: Basic Books.
- Snyder, Timothy; Brandon, Ray, eds. (2014). Stalin and Europe: Imitation and Domination, 1928–1953. Oxford and New York: Oxford University Press.
- Statiev, Alexander (2010). The Soviet Counterinsurgency in the Western Borderlands. Cambridge, UK: Cambridge University Press.
- Stephan, Robert W. (2004). Stalin's Secret War: Soviet Counterintelligence Against the Nazis, 1941–1945. Lawrence, Kansas: University Press of Kansas.
- Stone, David R., ed. (2010). The Soviet Union at War, 1941–1945. Barnsley, UK: Pen & Sword.
- Suvorov, Victor (2008). The Chief Culprit: Stalin's Grand Design to Start World War II. Annapolis, Maryland: Naval Institute Press.
- Uldricks, Teddy J. (2009). "War, Politics and Memory: Russian Historians Reevaluate the Origins of World War II". History and Memory. 21 (2): 60–82. doi:10.2979/his.2009.21.2.60. S2CID 153650494. – historiography
- Wegner, Bernd, ed. (1997). From Peace to War: Germany, Soviet Russia, and the World, 1939–1941. Oxford: Berghahn.
- Weiner, Amir (2001). Making Sense of War: The Second World War and the Fate of the Bolshevik Revolution. Princeton, New Jersey: Princeton University Press.
- Werth, Alexander (1964). Russia at War, 1941–1945. London: Barrie & Rockliff.

==== Spain ====
- Burdick, Charles B. (1968). Germany's Military Strategy and Spain in World War II. Syracuse, New York: Syracuse University Press.
- Payne, Stanley G. (2008). Franco and Hitler: Spain, Germany, and World War II. New Haven, Connecticut: Yale University Press.
- Pike, David Wingeate (2008). Franco and the Axis Stigma. New York: Palgrave Macmillan.

==== Sweden ====
- Carlgren, W. M. (1977). Swedish Foreign Policy during the Second World War. Translated by Spencer, Arthur. New York: St. Martin's. ISBN 978-0-312-78058-6.
- Gilmour, John (2011). Sweden, the Swastika and Stalin: The Swedish Experience in the Second World War. Edinburgh: Edinburgh University Press.

==== Switzerland ====
- Bower, Tom (1997). Nazi Gold: The Full Story of the Fifty-Year Swiss-Nazi Conspiracy to Steal Billions from Europe's Jews and Holocaust Survivors. New York: HarperCollins.
- Halbrook, Stephen (2010). The Swiss and the Nazis. Philadelphia: Casemate Pub.
- Kreis, Georg (2000). Switzerland and the Second World War. London: Cass.
- Piekalkiewicz, Janusz (1978). Schweiz 39–45 [Switzerland 39–45] (in German). Motorbuch Verlag. ISBN 3-87943-510-3.
- Wylie, Neville (2003). Britain, Switzerland, and the Second World War. Oxford: Oxford University Press.

==== Turkey ====
- Cossaboom, Robert; Leiser, Gary (1998). "Adana Station 1943–45: Prelude to the Post-War American Military Presence in Turkey". Middle Eastern Studies. 34 (1): 73–86. doi:10.1080/00263209808701210. JSTOR 4283918.
- Deringil, Selim (1989). Turkish Foreign Policy During the Second World War: An "Active" Neutrality. Cambridge and New York: Cambridge University Press.
- MacFie, A. L. (1989). "The Turkish Straits in the Second World War, 1939–45". Middle Eastern Studies. 25 (2): 238–248. doi:10.1080/00263208908700778. JSTOR 4283302.
- Olmert, Y. (1987). "Britain, Turkey and the Levant Question during the Second World War". Middle Eastern Studies. 23 (4): 437–452. doi:10.1080/00263208708700720. JSTOR 4283204.
- Tamkin, Nicholas (2009). Britain, Turkey, and the Soviet Union, 1940–45: Strategy, Diplomacy, and Intelligence in the Eastern Mediterranean. New York: Palgrave Macmillan.
- Weber, Frank G. (1979). The Evasive Neutral: Germany, Britain, and the Quest for a Turkish Alliance in the Second World War. Columbia: University of Missouri Press. ISBN 978-0-8262-0262-8.

==== United Kingdom ====
- Agar, Herbert (1972). Britain Alone: June 1940 – June 1941. London: Bodley Head.
- Calder, Angus (1971). The People's War: Britain, 1939–1945. London: Panther.
- Collier, Basil (1957). The Defence of the United Kingdom. London: HMSO.
- Donnelly, Mark (1999). Britain in the Second World War. New York: Routledge.
- Donnison, Frank S. V. (1956). British Military Administration in the Far East, 1943–46. London: HMSO.
- Gillman, Peter; Gillman, Leni (1980). Collar the Lot! How Britain Interned & Expelled its Wartime Refugees. Quartet Books.
- Harkness, Douglas (1955). The War and British Agriculture. London: King & Staples.
- Hogg, Quintin (1945). The Left Was Never Right. London: Faber and Faber.
- Kolinsky, Martin (1999). Britain's War in the Middle East: Strategy and Diplomacy, 1936–1942. Basingstoke, UK: Macmillan.
- MacInnes, Charles M. (1962). Bristol at war. London: Museum.
- Ponting, Clive (1990). 1940: Myth and Reality. AbeBooks. ISBN 978-1-56663-036-8.
- Rachev, Stoyan (1981). Anglo-Bulgarian Relations during the Second World War, 1939–1944. Translated by Kostov, Stefan. Sofia, Bulgaria: Sofia.
- Smith, Colin (2009). England's Last War against France: Fighting Vichy 1940–1942. London: Weidenfeld and Nicolson.
- Thomas, R. T. (1979). Britain and Vichy: The Dilemma of Anglo-French Relations, 1940–42. New York: St. Martin's.
- War Office Battles Nomenclature Committee (1956). The Official Names of Battles, Actions and Engagements fought by the Land Forces of the Commonwealth during the Second World War, 1939–1945. London: HMSO.
- Wood, Ian S. (2010). Societies at War: Britain, Ireland and the Second World War. Edinburgh: Edinburgh University Press.

==== Yugoslavia ====
- Dedijer, Vladimir (1992). The Yugoslav Auschwitz and the Vatican: The Croatian Massacre of the Serbs During World War II. Amherst, N.Y.: Prometheus Books.
- Tolstoy, Nikolai (1986). The Minister and the Massacres. London: Hutchinson.
- Tomasevich, Jozo (2001). War and Revolution in Yugoslavia, 1941–1945: Occupation and Collaboration. Stanford, California: Stanford University Press.

=== The Middle East ===
- Baram, Phillip (1978). The Department of State in the Middle East, 1919–1945. Philadelphia: University of Pennsylvania Press.
- Dann, Uriel; Mekhon Shiloaḥ le-ḥeḳer ha-Mizraḥ ha-tikhon ṿe-Afriḳah., eds. (1988). The Great Powers in the Middle East, 1919–1939. New York: Holmes and Meier.
- Hirszowicz, Lukasz (1966). The Third Reich and the Arab East. London: Routledge.
- Motadel, David (2014). Islam and Nazi Germany's War. Cambridge, Massachusetts: Belknap Press of Harvard University Press.
- Porath, Yehoshua (1986). In Search of Arab Unity, 1930–1945. London: Frank Cass.

==== Egypt ====
- Beinin, Joel; Lockman, Zachary (1987). Workers on the Nile: Nationalism, Communism, Islam and the Egyptian Working Class, 1882–1954. Princeton, New Jersey: Princeton University Press.
- Gershoni, Israel; Jankowski, J. (2010). Confronting Fascism in Egypt: Dictatorship Versus Democracy in the 1930s. Stanford, California: Stanford University Press.
- Morsy, Laila Amin (1994). "Indicative Cases of Britain's Wartime Policy in Egypt, 1942–44". Middle Eastern Studies. 30 (1): 91–122. doi:10.1080/00263209408700985. JSTOR 4283617.

==== Fr. Syria (Syria, Lebanon) ====
- Nordbruch, Goetz (2009). Nazism in Lebanon and Syria: The Ambivalence of the German Option, 1933–1945. London: Routledge.

==== Iran ====
- Dadkhah, Kamran M. (2001). "The Iranian Economy during the Second World War: The Devaluation Controversy". Middle Eastern Studies. 37 (2): 181–198. doi:10.1080/714004394. JSTOR 4284160. S2CID 153831209.

==== Palestine ====
- Cohen, Michael J. (1978). Palestine: Retreat from the Mandate. The Making of British Policy, 1936–1945. London: Macmillan.
- El-Eini, Roza (2006). Mandated Landscape: British Imperial Rule in Palestine, 1929–1948. London: Routledge.
- Khallaf, Issa (1991). Politics in Palestine: Arab Factionalism and Social Disintegration, 1939–1948. Albany, New York: State University of New York Press.
- Melka, R. (1969). "Nazi Germany and the Palestine Question". Middle Eastern Studies. 5 (3): 221–233. doi:10.1080/00263206908700130. JSTOR 4282292.
- Nicosia, Francis R. (1985). The Third Reich and the Palestine Question. Austin, Texas: University of Texas Press.
- Penkower, Monty N. (2002). Decision on Palestine Deferred: America, Britain and Wartime Diplomacy. London: Frank Cass.
- Sharfman, Daphna (2014). Palestine in the Second World War: Strategic Plans and Political Dilemmas. Eastbourne: Sussex Academic Press.
- Zweig, Ronald W. (1986). Britain and Palestine during the Second World War. New York: St. Martin's.

=== Oceania ===
==== Australia ====
- Bateson, Charles (1968). The War with Japan. London: Barrie & Rockliff.
- Bean, Charles E. W. (1943). War Aims of a plain Australian. Sydney: Angus & Robertson.
- Beaumont, Joan, ed. (1996). Australia's War, 1939–1945. Sydney: Allen & Unwin.
- Bell, Roger J. (1977). Unequal Allies: Australian–American Relations and the Pacific War. Melbourne: Melbourne University Press.
- Buggy, Hugh (1945). Pacific Victory: A Short History of Australia's Part in the War against Japan. Melbourne: Victorian Railway.
- Bulcock, Roy (1947). Of death but once. Melbourne: Cheshire.
- Butlin, Sydney J. (1955). War Economy. Canberra: Australian War Memorial.
- Crawford, John G.; et al. (1954). Wartime Agriculture in Australia and New Zealand, 1939–50. Stanford, CA: Stanford University Press.
- Day, David (1992). Reluctant Nation: Australia and the Allied Defeat of Japan, 1942–1945. New York: Oxford University Press.
- Day, David (2003). The Politics of War. Sydney: HarperCollins Publishers.
- Evatt, Herbert V. (1945). Foreign Policy of Australia. Sydney: Angus & Robertson.
- Foenander, Orwell de R. (1943). Wartime Labour Developments in Australia. Melbourne: Melbourne University Press.
- Forbes, Cameron (2005). Hellfire: The Story of Australia, Japan and the Prisoners of War. Sydney: Pan MacMillan Australia.
- Hole, Tahu (1942). Anzacs into Battle. London: Hodder & Stoughton.
- Horner, David (1982). High Command. Australia and Allied strategy 1939–1945. Sydney: Allen & Unwin with the assistance of the Australian War Memorial.
- Idriess, Ion L. (1945). Horrie, the Wog-Dog with the A.I.F. in Egypt, Greece, Crete and Palestine. Sydney: Angus & Robertson.
- Johnston, Mark (1996). At the Front Line : Experiences of Australian Soldiers in World War II. Cambridge: Cambridge University Press.
- Johnston, Mark (2007). The Australian Army in World War II. Elite. Oxford: Osprey Publishing.
- Johnston, Mark (2011). Whispering Death: Australian Airmen in the Pacific War. Crows Nest, New South Wales: Allen & Unwin.
- Laffin, John (1965). Anzacs at War: The Story of Australian and New Zealand Battles. Canberra: Abelard-Schuman.
- McKernan, Michael (2006). The Strength of a Nation. Six years of Australians fighting for the nation and defending the homeland during WWII. Sydney: Allen & Unwin.
- Meeking, Charles; Bartlett, N., eds. (1958). Pictorial History of Australia at War, 1939–1945. Canberra: Australian War Memorial.
- Offenburg, Kurt (1941). War in the Pacific?. Sydney: Gayle.
- Offenburg, Kurt (1942). Japan at our gates. Sydney: Gayle.
- Powell, Alan (1988). The Shadow's Edge: Australia's Northern War. Melbourne: Melbourne University Press.
- Powell, Alan (1996). War by Stealth: Australians and the Allied Intelligence Bureau, 1942–1945. Melbourne: Melbourne University Press.
- Pratten, Garth (2009). Australian Battalion Commanders in the Second World War. Port Melbourne, Victoria: Cambridge University Press.
- Stanley, Peter (2008). Invading Australia: Japan and the Battle for Australia, 1942. Melbourne: Penguin Group (Australia).
- Thomson, Joyce (1991). The WAAAF in Wartime Australia. Melbourne: Melbourne University Press.
- Wahlert, Glenn, ed. (1995). Australian Army Amphibious Operations in the South-West Pacific: 1942–45. Canberra: Australian Army Doctrine Centre.
- Walker, Allan S.; et al. (1961). Medical Services of the R.A.N. and R.A.A.F. with Section on Women in the Army Medical Services. Canberra: Australian War Memorial.

==== New Zealand ====
- Crawford, John G.; et al. (1954). Wartime Agriculture in Australia and New Zealand, 1939–50. Stanford, CA: Stanford University Press.
- Hole, Tahu (1942). Anzacs into Battle. London: Hodder & Stoughton.
- Laffin, John (1965). Anzacs at War: The Story of Australian and New Zealand Battles. Canberra: Abelard-Schuman.

== Science and technology ==
=== Aircraft development and specific aircraft types ===
- Green, William (1959–1960). Famous bombers of the Second World War. Vol. 1–2. London: Macdonald.

==== Germany ====
- Ward, Richard (1972). Luftwaffe bomber and fighter camouflage and markings, 1940: Heinkel HE III, Junkers Ju 88, Domier Do 17. Vol. 1–2. Reading (Berkshire): Osprey.
- ——— (1974). Focke-Wulf Fw 190A, F, G: Luftwaffe. Reading (Berkshire): Osprey.

==== Japan ====
- Francillon, Robert (1979). Japanese Aircraft of the Pacific War. Annapolis: Naval Institute Press.

==== United Kingdom ====
- Garbett, Mike; Gouldring, Brian (1971). The Lancaster at war. London: Allan.
- Tubbs, Douglas B. (1971). Lancaster Bomber. New York: Ballantine.

==== United States ====
- Berger, Carl (1970). B.29: The Superfortress. New York: Ballantine.
- Freeman, Roger A. (1973). American Bombers of World War Two. Windsor: Hylton Lacey.
- Jablonski, Edward (1974). Flying Fortress: the illustrated biography of the B-17s and the men who flew them. London: Sidgwick & Jackson.
- Munday, E. A. (1972). USAAF heavy bomb group markings and camouflage, 1941–1945 Consolidated B-24 Liberator. Reading (Berkshire): Osprey.
- Sinclair, William B. (1972). The big brothers: the story of the B-29s. San Antonio, Texas: Naylor.
- Ward, Richard (1973). USAAF Heavy Bomb Group markings and camouflage, 1941–1945: Boeing B-17 Flying Fortress. Reading (Berkshire): Osprey.

=== Jet engines ===
- Giffard, Hermione (2016). Making Jet Engines in World War II. University of Chicago Press.

=== Nuclear technology and atomic weapons ===
- Jungk, Robert (1958). Brighter than a Thousand Suns: A Personal History of the Atomic Scientists. San Diego: Harcourt.

== Secondary literature, other ==
=== Animals ===
- Bourne, Dorothea St. H. (1947). They Also Serve. London: Winchester.
- Dempewolff, Richard F. (1943). Animal Reveille. New York: Doubleday.
- Downey, Fairfax D. (1947). Dogs for Defense: American Dogs in the 2nd World War. New York: Viking.
- Gilroy, James (1947). Furred and Feathered Heroes of World War II. New York: Viking.
- Going, Clayton G. (1944). Dogs at War. New York: Macmillan.
- Idriess, Ion L. (1945). Horrie, the Wog-Dog with the A.I.F. in Egypt, Greece, Crete and Palestine. Sydney: Angus & Robertson.
- Riddell, James (1957). Dog in the Snow. London: Joseph.
- Varley, Edwin (1973). The Judy Story: The Dog with Six Lives. London: Souvenir.

=== Art and artists ===
- Bohm-Duchen, Monica. (2014). Art and the Second World War. Princeton University Press.
- Comfort, Charles F. (1956). Artist at War. Toronto: Ryerson.
- Flanner, Janet (1970). Men and Monuments. Freeport, NY: Books for Libraries.
- Howe, Thomas C. (1956). Salt Mines and Castles: The Discovery and Restitution of Looted European Art. Indianapolis: Bobbs-Merrill.
- Magriel, Paul D., ed. (1943). Art and the Soldier. Biloxi, MS: Special Service Kesterfield.
- Methuen, Paul A. (1952). Normandy Diary: Being a Record of Survivals and Losses of Historical Monuments in Northwest France, together with those of the Island of Walcheren and in that Part of Belgium traversed by the 21st Army Group in 1944–45. London: Hale.
- Newton, Eric, ed. (1945). War through Artists' Eyes: Paintings and Drawings by British War Artists. London: Murray.
- Rorimer, James J. (1950). Survival: The Salvage and Protection of Art in War. New York: Abelard.
- Topolski, Feliks (1941). Three Continents, 1944–45. London: Methuen.

==== Italy ====
- Fasola, Cesare (1945). The Florence Galleries and the War: History and Records with a List of Missing Works of Art. Florence: Casa Editrice Monsalvato.
- Hartt, Frederick (1949). Florentine Art under Fire. Princeton, NJ: Princeton University Press.
- Jenkinson, Hilary; Bell, H. E. (1947). Italian Archives during the War and at its Close. London: HMSO.
- Lavagnino, Emilio (1947). Fifty War-Damaged Monuments of Italy. London: HMSO.

==== Soviet Union ====
- Topolski, Feliks (1942). Russia in War. London: Methuen.

==== United Kingdom ====
- Topolski, Feliks (1941). Britain in Peace and War. London: Methuen.

==== United States ====
- Baldwin, Hanson W. (1943). The Navy at War: Paintings and Drawings by Combat Artists. New York: Morrow.
- Brodie, Howard (1963). War Drawings: World War II, Korea. Melbourne: National Press.
- Coale, Griffith B. (1942). North Atlantic Patrol: The Log of a Sea Going Artist. Farrar.
- Crane, Aimee, ed. (1943). G.I. Sketch Book. New York: Scribner.
- Crane, Aimee, ed. (1943). Marines at War. New York: Scribner.
- Crane, Aimee, ed. (1944). Art in the Armed Forces: Pictured by Men in Action. New York: Scribner.

=== Biographies and person-focussed works ===
The following lists should include works of secondary literature concerned with a singular person that participated in World War II, as well as with the context and content of that service. These books can either be full biographies or be person-focussed studies of the respective subject's wartime service. The subjects of the biography should be listed (preferably wikilinked) after the respective bibliographical entry to ease searching.

==== Collections of biographies ====
- Rees, Laurence (2008). Their Darkest Hour: People Tested to the Extreme in WWII. London: Ebury.

==== Military, generals/admirals ====
===== France, biographies of generals/admirals =====
- Funk, Arthur L. (1959). Charles de Gaulle: The Crucial Years, 1943–1944. Norman: University of Oklahoma Press. – Charles de Gaulle

===== Germany, biographies of generals/admirals =====
- Abshagen, Karl H. (1956). Canaris. London: Hutchinson. – Wilhelm Canaris
- Amort, Cestmir; Jedlicka, I. M. (1970). The Canaris File. London: Allan Wingate. – Wilhelm Canaris
- Bird, Keith (2006). Erich Raeder: Admiral of the Third Reich. Annapolis: Naval Institute Press. – Erich Raeder
- Brissaud, Andre (1974). Colvin, Ian (ed.). Canaris: The Biography of Admiral Canaris, Chief of German Military Intelligence in the Second World War. New York: Grosset & Dunlap. – Wilhelm Canaris
- Colvin, Ian (1951). Chief of Intelligence. London: Gollancz. – Wilhelm Canaris
- Fraser, David (1995). Knight's Cross: A Life of Field Marshal Erwin Rommel. New York: Harper. – Erwin Rommel
- Macksey, Kenneth J. (1976). Guderian: Creator of the Blitzkrieg. Stein and Days Publishing. ISBN 978-0-8128-1844-4. – Heinz Guderian

===== Japan, biographies of generals/admirals =====
- Agawa, Hiroyuki (1979). The Reluctant Admiral: Yamamoto and the Imperial Navy. New York: Kodansha American. – Isoroku Yamamoto
- Hoyt, Edwin P. (1993). The Last Kamikaze: The Story of Admiral Matome Ugaki. Westport, Connecticut: Praeger. – Matome Ugaki

===== Soviet Union, biographies of generals/admirals =====
- Chaney, Otto Preston Jr. (1971). Zhukov. Norman, Oklahoma: University of Oklahoma Press. – Georgy Zhukov

===== United Kingdom, biographies of generals/admirals =====
- Hillson, Norman (1952). Alexander of Tunis: A Biographical Portrait. London: W. H. Allen. – Harold Alexander
- Jackson, William G. F. (1971). Alexander of Tunis as Military Commander. London: Batsford. – Harold Alexander
- Mead, Richard (2007). Churchill's Lions: A Biographical Guide to the Key British Generals of World War II. Stroud: Spellmount. ISBN 978-1-86227-431-0.
- Nicolson, Nigel (1973). Alex: The Life of Field Marshal Earl Alexander of Tunis. London: Weidenfeld & Nicolson. – Harold Alexander

===== United States, biographies of generals/admirals =====
- Ambrose, Stephen (1967). Eisenhower and Berlin, 1945: The Decision to Halt at the Elbe. New York: W.W. Norton. – Dwight D. Eisenhower
- ——— (1990). Eisenhower: Soldier and President. New York: Simon & Schuster. ISBN 978-0-671-70107-9. – Dwight D. Eisenhower
- ——— (1983). Eisenhower: Soldier, General of the Army, President-Elect, 1890–1952. New York: Simon & Schuster. – Dwight D. Eisenhower
- ——— (1970). The Supreme Commander: The War Years of Dwight D. Eisenhower. New York: Doubleday. – Dwight D. Eisenhower
- Ayling, Keith (1945). Old Leatherface of the Flying Tigers: the story of General Chennault. Indianapolis: Bobbs-Merill. – Claire Chennault
- Chambers, George W. (1946). Keith Agraves, Paratrooper: an Account of the Service of a Christian Medical Corpsman in the U.S. Army Paratroops during World War II. Nashville, TN: Southern. – Keith Argraves
- D'Este, Carlo (2003). Eisenhower: A Soldier's Life. London: Weidenfeld & Nicolson. – Dwight D. Eisenhower
- Eisenhower, David (1986). Eisenhower at War, 1943–1945. New York: Random House. ISBN 978-0-394-41237-5. – Dwight D. Eisenhower
- Eisenhower, John (2003). General Ike. New York: Free Press. ISBN 978-0-7432-4474-9. – Dwight D. Eisenhower
- Jablonsky, David (2010). War by Land, Sea, and Air: Dwight Eisenhower and the Concept of Unified Command. New Haven and London: Yale University Press. – Dwight D. Eisenhower
- Jordan, Jonathan W. (2011). Brothers, Rivals, Victors: Eisenhower, Patton, Bradley, and the Partnership that Drove the Allied Conquest in Europe. New York: NAL Caliber. – Dwight D. Eisenhower; George S. Patton; Omar Bradley
- Krieg, Joann P., ed. (1987). Dwight D. Eisenhower, Soldier, President, Statesman. New York: Greenwood Press. – Dwight D. Eisenhower
- Manchester, William (1978). American Caesar: Douglas MacArthur, 1880–1964. Boston: Little, Brown & Co. ISBN 978-0-316-54498-6. – Douglas MacArthur
- Parmet, Herbert S. (1972). Eisenhower and the American Crusades. New York: Macmillan. ISBN 978-0-02-594790-0. – Dwight D. Eisenhower
- Pogue, Forrest C. (1973). George C. Marshall: Organizer of Victory, 1943–1945. New York: Viking. – George C. Marshall
- Smith, Jean Edward (2012). Eisenhower in War and Peace. New York: Random House. – Dwight D. Eisenhower
- Wicker, Tom (2012). Dwight D. Eisenhower. New York: Times Books. – Dwight D. Eisenhower

===== Yugoslavia =====
- Ranković, Aleksandar (1947). Traitor Draža Mihailović: In the Hands of the Authority of People's Power. Svoboda. – Draža Mihailović

==== Military, other ====
===== Canada, biographies of military personnel (non-generals/admirals) =====
- Clark, Andrew (2003). A Keen Soldier: The Execution of Second World War Private Harold Pringle. Toronto: Alfred A. Knopf Canada. – Harold Pringle

===== United Kingdom, biographies of military personnel (non-generals/admirals) =====
- Bickers, Richard (1962). Ginger Lacey, fighter pilot: Battle of Britain top scorer. London: Hale. – James Harry Lacey
- Braddon, Russell (1954). Cheshire, V.C.: a study of war and peace [US title: "New Wings for a Warrior"]. London: Evans. – Leonard Cheshire
- Burke, Edmund (1961). Guy Gibson, V.C. London: Arco. – Guy Gibson

===== United States, biographies of military personnel (non-generals/admirals) =====
- Ambrose, Stephen (1992). Band of Brothers: E Company, 506th Regiment, 101st Airborne: From Normandy to Hitler's Eagle's Nest. New York: Simon & Schuster. – Easy Company, 506th Infantry Regiment
- Ambrose, Stephen (1998). The Victors: Eisenhower and His Boys – The Men of World War II. New York: Simon & Schuster. – U.S. Army personnel
- Ambrose, Stephen (2001). The Wild Blue: The Men and Boys who Flew the B-24s Over Germany. New York: Simon & Schuster. – B24 bomber crews, including George McGovern
- Donovan, Robert J. (2001). PT-109: John F. Kennedy in WW II (40th Anniversary ed.). McGraw Hill. – John F. Kennedy
- Koerner, Brendan I. (2008). Now the Hell Will Start: One Soldier's Flight from the Greatest Manhunt of World War II. New York: Penguin. – Herman Perry
- Moore, Gary W. (2006). Playing With the Enemy. New York: Penguin. – Gene Moore

==== Politicians, political leaders, monarchs ====
This section should be limited to those persons who were politicians and political leaders during World War II. Postwar political leaders should be placed in the sections relevant to their wartime experience.

===== Australia, biographies of political figures =====
- Day, David (1999). John Curtin: A Life. Sydney: HarperCollins Publishers. – John Curtin

===== Belgium, biographies of political figures =====
- Cammaerts, Emile (1941). Prisoner at Laeken: King Leopold. London: Cresset. – Leopold III of Belgium
- Goffin, Robert (1941). Was Leopold a traitor?: the story of Belgium's eighteen tragic days. London: Hamilton. – Leopold III of Belgium

===== France, biographies of political figures =====
- Funk, Arthur L. (1959). Charles de Gaulle: The Crucial Years, 1943–1944. Norman: University of Oklahoma Press. – Charles de Gaulle

===== Germany, biographies of political figures =====
- Fest, Joachim C. (2002). Hitler. Orlando, Florida: Harcourt. – Adolf Hitler
- Gerwarth, Robert (2011). Hitler's Hangman: The Life of Heydrich. New Haven, Connecticut: Yale University Press. – Reinhard Heydrich
- Joachimsthaler, Anton (1999). The Last Days of Hitler: The Legends, The Evidence, The Truth. Brockhampton Press. – Adolf Hitler
- Kershaw, Ian (2000). Hitler: 1889–1936, Hubris. New York: W. W. Norton & Company. – Adolf Hitler
- ——— (2001). Hitler: 1936–1945, Nemesis. New York: W. W. Norton & Co. – Adolf Hitler
- ——— (2008). Hitler: A Biography. New York: W. W. Norton & Co. – Adolf Hitler
- Longerich, Peter (2012). Heinrich Himmler: A Life. Oxford: Oxford University Press. – Heinrich Himmler
- ——— (2015). Goebbels: A Biography. New York: Random House. – Joseph Goebbels
- McGovern, James (1968). Martin Bormann. London: Barker. – Martin Bormann
- Sereny, Gitta (1995). Albert Speer: His Battle with Truth. New York: Alfred A. Knopf. – Albert Speer
- Whiting, Charles (1973). The Hunt for Martin Bormann. New York: Ballantine. – Martin Bormann

===== Soviet Union, biographies of political figures =====
- Beria, Sergo (2001). Beria my Father: Inside Stalin's Kremlin. London: Duckworth. – Lavrentiy Beria
- McNeal, Robert H. (1988). Stalin: Man and Ruler. New York: New York University Press. – Joseph Stalin

===== United Kingdom, biographies of political figures =====
- Martin, Gilbert (1983). Finest Hour: Winston S. Churchill, 1939–1941. London: William Heinemann. – Winston Churchill
- Martin, Gilbert (1986). Road to Victory: Winston S. Churchill 1941–1945. London: William Heinemann. – Winston Churchill

===== United States, biographies of political figures =====
- Blum, John Morton (1970). Roosevelt and Morgenthau: A Revision and Condensation of From the Morgenthau Diaries. Boston: Houghton Mifflin. – Franklin D. Roosevelt; Henry Morgenthau Jr.
- Reid, Warren R., ed. (1961). Public Papers of the Presidents of the United States: Harry S Truman, 1945. Washington, D.C.: U.S. Government Printing Office. – Harry S. Truman

==== Scientists ====
===== United States, biographies of scientists =====
- Jungk, Robert (1958). Brighter than a Thousand Suns: A Personal History of the Atomic Scientists. San Diego: Harcourt.

==== Writers and poets ====
===== Soviet Union, biographies of writers/poets =====
- Beevor, Antony; Vinogradova, Lyuba, eds. (2005). A Writer at War – Vasily Grossman with the Red Army, 1941–1945. New York: Pantheon Books. – Vasily Grossman

==== Victims of genocide or ethnoracial persecution/oppression ====
===== Holocaust =====
- Kirsch, Jonathan (2013). The Short, Strange Life of Herschel Grynszpan. New York: W.W. Norton & Co. – Herschel Grynszpan

===== Japanese Americans =====
- Adams, Ansel (1944). Born Free and Equal: The Story of Loyal Japanese-Americans. New York: U.S. Camera. – victims of the internment of Japanese Americans

===== Porajmos =====
- Polansky, Paul. (1998). Black Silence: The Lety Survivors Speak. Self-published. – survivors of Lety concentration camp

==== Victims of warfare ====
===== Japan =====
- Bruckner, Karl (1962). The Day of the Bomb. Van Nostrand. – Sadako Sasaki

=== Diplomatic history ===
- Armstrong, Anne (1961). Unconditional Surrender: The Impact of the Casablanca policy upon World War II. New Brunswick, NJ: Rutgers University Press.
- Beaumont, Joan (1980). Comrades in Arms: British Aid to Russia, 1941−1945. London: Davis-Poynter.
- Bell, Roger J. (1977). Unequal Allies: Australian–American Relations and the Pacific War. Melbourne: Melbourne University Press.
- Bernd, Martin (1970). Zur Vorgeschichte des deutsch-japanischen Kriegsbündnisses [About the Prehistory of the German-Japanese Wartime Alliance]. Freiburg: Albert Ludwig University.
- Boyd, Carld (1981). "The Berlin-Tokyo Axis and Japanese Military Initiative". Modern Asian Studies. 15 (2): 311–338. doi:10.1017/S0026749X00007095. JSTOR 312095. S2CID 145782449.
- Carlgren, W. M. (1977). Swedish Foreign Policy during the Second World War. Translated by Spencer, Arthur. New York: St. Martin's. ISBN 978-0-312-78058-6.
- Charmley, John (2001). "Churchill and the American Alliance". Transactions of the Royal Historical Society. Sixth Series 11: 353–371. doi:10.1017/S0080440101000184. ISSN 0080-4401. JSTOR 3679428. S2CID 154790604.
- Deakin, Frederick W. (1962). The Brutal Friendship: Mussolini, Hitler and the Fall of Italian Fascism. London: Weidenfeld & Nicolson.
- DiNardo, Richard (Oct 1996). "The Dysfunctional Coalition: The Axis Powers and the Eastern Front in World War II". The Journal of Military History. 60 (4): 711–730. doi:10.2307/2944662. JSTOR 2944662.
- DiNardo, Richard (2005). Germany and the Axis Powers: From Coalition to Collapse. Lawrence: University Press of Kansas.
- Evatt, Herbert V. (1945). Foreign Policy of Australia. Sydney: Angus & Robertson.
- Fenyo, Mario D. (1972). Hitler, Horthy, and Hungary: German-Hungarian Relations, 1941–1944. New Haven, Connecticut: Yale University Press.
- Gorodetsky, Gabriel (1990). "The Impact of the Ribbentrop-Molotov Pact on the Course of Soviet Foreign Policy". Cahiers du Monde russe et soviétique. 31 (1). EHESS: 27–41. doi:10.3406/cmr.1990.2200. JSTOR 20170697.
- Hein, David (July 2013). "Vulnerable: HMS Prince of Wales in 1941". Journal of Military History. 77 (3).
- Ikle, Frank W. (1956). German-Japanese Relations, 1936–1946. New York: Bookman.
- Johnson, Ian Ona (2021). Faustian Bargain: The Soviet-German Partnership and the Origins of the Second World War. Oxford University Press. ISBN 978-0-19-067514-1.
- Johnsen, Julia E. (1942). The Eight Points of Post-War World Reorganization. New York: Wilson.
- Kimball, Warren (1997). Forged in War: Churchill, Roosevelt and the Second World War. New York: HarperCollins. ISBN 978-0-06-203484-7.
- Knox, MacGregor (2000). Common Destiny: Dictatorship, Foreign Policy and War in Fascist Italy and Nazi Germany. Cambridge, UK: Cambridge University Press. ISBN 978-0-521-58208-7.
- Langer, William L.; Gleason, S. Everett (1953). The Undeclared War 1940–1941: The World Crisis and American Foreign Policy. Harper & Brothers. LCCN 53007738.
- MacDonald, Callum A. (1981). The United States, Britain and Appeasement 1936–1945. Macmillan. ISBN 978-1-349-16571-1.
- Meskill, Johanna M. M. (1966). Hitler and Japan: The Hollow Alliance. New York: Atherton.
- Morton, Henry C. V. (1943). Atlantic Meeting: An Account of Mr Churchill's Voyage in H.M.S. Prince of Wales in August 1941 and the Conference with President Roosevelt which resulted in the Atlantic Charter. London: Methuen.
- Musman, Richard (1968). Hitler and Mussolini. London: Chatto & Windus.
- Padmanabhan, C. E. (1962). Hitler-Stalin Axis War. Madras (India): Short-Bewes.
- Plehwe, Friedrich-Karl v. (1971). The End of an Alliance: Rome's Defection from the Axis in 1943. London: Oxford University Press.
- Plokhy, S. M. (2010). Yalta: The Price of Peace. New York: Penguin Books.
- Presseisen, Ernst L. (1958). Germany and Japan: A Study in Totalitarian Diplomacy 1931–1941. Springer Science. OCLC 890810055.
- Schroeder, Paul W. (1941). Axis Alliance and Japanese-American Relation, 1941. Ithaca, NY: Cornell University Press.
- Sontag, Raymond J., ed. (1948). Nazi-Soviet Relations, 1939–1941: Documents from the Archives of the German Foreign Office. US Department of State.
- Snell, John L. (1965). Illusion and Necessity: The Diplomacy of Global War, 1939–1945. Boston: Houghton Mifflin.
- Tolstoy, Nikolai (1977). Victims of Yalta. London: Corgi Books.
- Turbett, Colin (2021). The Anglo-Soviet Alliance: Comrades & Allies during WW2. Pen & Sword Military. ISBN 978-1-5267-7659-4.
- Wilson, Theodore A. (1969). The First Summit: Roosevelt and Churchill at Placentia Bay, 1941. Boston, MA: Houghton Mifflin.
- Wiskemann, Elizabeth (1949). The Rome-Berlin Axis: A Study of the Relations between Hitler and Mussolini. London: Oxford University Press.
- Wylie, Neville, ed. (2001). European Neutrals and Non-Belligerents during the Second World War. Cambridge, UK: Cambridge University Press.

=== Economic history, resource production, agriculture ===
- Baime, A. J. (2015). The Arsenal of Democracy: FDR, Detroit, and an Epic Quest to Arm an America at War. Boston: Mariner Books.
- Butlin, Sydney J. (1955). War Economy. Canberra: Australian War Memorial.
- Britnell, George; Fowke, Vernon C. (1962). Canadian Agriculture in War and Peace. Stanford, CA: Stanford University Press.
- Crawford, John G.; et al. (1954). Wartime Agriculture in Australia and New Zealand, 1939–50. Stanford, CA: Stanford University Press.
- Gold, Bela (1949). Wartime Economic Planning in Agriculture: a Study in the Relocation of Resources. New York: Columbia University Press.
- Goralski, Robert; Freeburg, Russell W. (1987). Oil and war: How the deadly struggle for fuel in WWII meant victory or defeat. Morrow.
- Harkness, Douglas (1955). The War and British Agriculture. London: King & Staples.
- Harrison, Mark, ed. (2000). The Economics of World War II: Six Great Powers in International Comparison. Cambridge UK: Cambridge University Press.
- Herman, Arthur (2012). Freedom's Forge: How American Business Produced Victory in World War II. New York: Random House.
- Kennedy, Paul (2013). Engineers of Victory: The Problem Solvers Who Turned The Tide in the Second World War. New York: Random House.
- Klein, Maury (2013). A Call to Arms: Mobilizing America for World War II. London: Bloomsbury Press.
- Milward, Alan (1977). War, Economy and Society, 1939–1945. London: Alan Lane.
- Motter, Thomas H. (1952). The Persian Corridor and Aid to Russia. Washington, D.C.: US Army Center for Military History.
- Tinley, James M. (1954). South African Food and Agriculture in World War II. Stanford, CA: Stanford University Press.
- Walker, Edward R. (1947). The Australian Economy in War and Reconstruction. London: Oxford University Press.
- Wilcox, Walter W. (1947). The Farmer in the Second World War. Ames: Iowa State College Press.
- Zagorov, Slavcho D.; et al. (1955). The Agricultural Economy of the Danubian Countries, 1935–1945. Stanford, CA: Stanford University Press.

==== Intelligence and espionage ====
- Armstrong, Richard N. (2008). Soviet Operational Deception: The Red Cloak. Fort Leavenworth, Kansas: U.S. Army Command and General Staff College.
- Bartholomew-Feis, Dixee R. (2006). The OSS and Ho Chi Minh: Unexpected Allies in the War against Japan. Lawrence: University Press of Kansas.
- Beevor, J.G. (1981). SOE – Recollections and Reflections, 1940–1945. London: Bodley Head.
- Breitman, Richard; Goda, Norman J. W.; Naftali, Timothy; Wolfe, Robert (2005). U.S. Intelligence and the Nazis. Cambridge, UK: Cambridge University Press. doi:10.1017/CBO9780511618178. ISBN 978-0-521-61794-9.
- Brown, Anthony Cave (1975). Bodyguard of Lies. New York: Harper & Row.
- Carter, Carolle J. (1977). The Shamrock and the Swastika: German Espionage in Ireland in World War II. Palo Alto, California: Pacific Books. ISBN 0-87015-221-1.
- Deacon, Richard (1982). A History of the Japanese Secret Service. London: Fredrick Muller.
- Hastings, Max (2016). The Secret War: Spies, Ciphers, and Guerrillas, 1939–1945. New York: Harper.
- Heimark, Brice (1994). The OSS Norwegian Special Operations Group in World War II. Westport, Connecticut: Praeger.
- Holt, Thaddeus (2004). The Deceivers: Allied Military Deception in the Second World War. London: Weidenfeld & Nicolson.
- Stephan, Robert W. (2004). Stalin's Secret War: Soviet Counterintelligence Against the Nazis, 1941–1945. Lawrence, Kansas: University Press of Kansas.
- Waller, John H. (1996). The Unseen War in Europe: Espionage and Conspiracy in the Second World War. New York: Random House. ISBN 978-0-679-44826-6.

==== Literature and fiction ====
- Edwards, Owen Dudley (2007). British Children's Fiction in the Second World War. Edinburgh University Press. ISBN 978-0-7486-1651-0.

=== Official histories ===
- Blet, Pierre; et al., eds. (1965–1981). Actes et documents du Saint Siège relatifs à la Seconde Guerre Mondiale [Acts and Documents of the Holy See related to the Second World War]. Libreria Editrice Vaticana.
- Boog, Horst; et al., eds. (1979–2008). Das Deutsche Reich und der Zweite Weltkrieg (in German). Vol. 1–10/2. Stuttgart: Deutsche Verlags-Anstalt. – Not technically an official history by the German government, however issued under the supervision of and funded and published by the Military History Research Office, an agency of the German Bundeswehr. Total of 13 volumes, with the two final volumes yet to be translated to English.
- Craven, Wesley Frank; Cate, James Lea, eds. (1948–1958). The Army Air Forces in World War II. University of Chicago Press.
- De Jong, Loe, ed. (1969–1991). Het Koninkrijk der Nederlanden in de Tweede Wereldoorlog [The Kingdom of the Netherlands During World War II] (in Dutch). Vol. 1–14. Amsterdam: NIOD.
- Feasby, W. R., ed. (1953–1956). Official History of the Canadian Medical Services, 1939–1945. Vol. 1–2. Ottawa: Queen's Printer.
- Greenfield, Kent Roberts; et al., eds. (1946–1998). United States Army in World War II. U.S. Army CMH.
- History of the Second World War – United Kingdom, 97 volumes
- Istoriia Velikoi Otechestvennoi Voiny Sovetskogo Soiuza 1941–1945 [Great Patriotic War of the Soviet Union, 1941–1945]. 1960–1965.
- Johnson, Gudrun; Gardner, Johan (1949–1951). Ording, Arne (ed.). Våre falne 1939–1945 [Our Fallen 1939–1945] (in Norwegian). Vol. 1–4. Oslo: Norwegian Government.
- Kippenberger, Howard; Fairbrother, Monty C., eds. (1949–1986). Official History of New Zealand in the Second World War 1939–45. Wellington: War History Branch.
- The "Magic" Background of Pearl Harbor. Vol. 1–5 (+3 Appendices). U.S. Government Printing Office. 1977.
- Long, Gavin, ed. (1952–1977). Australia in the War of 1939–1945. Vol. 1–22. Canberra: Australian War Memorial.
- Senshi Sōsho – 102 volumes in the Japanese language; 3 volumes translated to English.
- Singh, Brig. R., ed. (1950s). Official History of the Indian Armed Forces in the Second World War 1939–45.
- Stacey, Charles P., ed. (1955–1960). Official History of the Canadian Army in the Second World War. Vol. 1–3.

=== Mass media ===
- Cumberledge, G., ed. (1946). BBC War Report, 6th June 1944 – 5th May 1945. London: Oxford University Press.
- Newsome, Noel F. (1945). Man in the street (of the B.B.C.) talks to Europe. London: Staples.

=== Women's history ===
Biographies of individual women are to be found in the biographies section.

==== Sexual assault and rape during World War II ====
- Lily, J. Robert (2007). Taken By Force: Rape and American GIs in Europe in World War II. London: Palgrave Macmillan.

==== Women in combat roles during World War II ====
- Cassin-Scott, Jack (1980). Women at War 1939–45. Osprey Publishing. ISBN 0-85045-349-6.

==== Women's history, by country ====
===== Australia =====
- Adam-Smith, Patsy (1984). Australian Women at War. Melbourne: Thomas Nelson Australia.
- Thomson, Joyce (1991). The WAAAF in Wartime Australia. Melbourne: Melbourne University Press.

===== Soviet Union =====
- Krylova, Anna (2010). Soviet Women in Combat: A History of Violence on the Eastern Front. Cambridge, UK: Cambridge University Press.

===== United Kingdom =====
- Cavadini, Ada (1946). This was the A.T.S. London: Crisp.
- Cotterell, Anthony (1942). She walks in Battle Dress: The Day's Work in the A.T.S. London: Christophers.
- Sherman, Margaret (1944). No Time for Tears in the A.T.S. London: Harrap.

===== United States =====
- Barrett, Duncan; Calvi, Nuala (2003). GI Brides: The Wartime Girls Who Crossed the Atlantic for Love. London: HarperCollins.
- Campbell, D'Ann. (1984). Women at War with America: Private Lives in a Patriotic Era. Cambridge, Massachusetts: Harvard University Press.
- Holm, Jeanne M., ed. (1998). In Defense of a Nation: Servicewomen in World War II. Arlington, Va.: Vandamere Press.
- Litoff, Judy Barett; Smith, David C., eds. (1994). We're in this War Too: World War II Letters from Women in Uniform. New York: Oxford University Press.

== Aftermath of World War II ==
The following lists should include works of secondary literature concerned with the immediate and short-term aftermath of World War II, giving strong priority to such works that describe said events in specific relation and reference to World War II.

=== General ===
- Buruma, Ian (2013). Year Zero: A History of 1945. New York: Penguin. ISBN 978-1-59420-436-4.
- Dallas, Gregor (2005). 1945: The War That Never Ended. New Haven & London: Yale University Press.
- Lafeber, Walter (1967). America, Russia, and the Cold War, 1945–1966. New York: John Wiley & Sons. ISBN 978-0-471-51131-1.
- Lowe, Keith (2012). Savage Continent: Europe in the Aftermath of World War II. St Martin's Press. ISBN 978-0-241-96222-0.
- Lukacs, John (2010). The Legacy of the Second World War. New Haven and London: Yale University Press. ISBN 978-0-300-11439-3.

=== Establishment of the Eastern bloc ===
- Applebaum, Anne (2012). Iron Curtain: The Crushing of Eastern Europe, 1944–1956. New York and London: Doubleday. ISBN 978-0-385-51569-6.

=== Expulsion and refugee movements ===
- Ahonen, Pertti; Kochanowski, Jerzy; Corni, Gustavo (2008). Occupation in Europe – People on the Move: Forced Population Movements in Europe in the Second World War and its Aftermath. London: Berg.
- Douglas, R. M. (2012). Orderly and Humane: The Expulsion of the Germans after the Second World War. New Haven and London: Yale University Press.
- Zayas, Alfred-Maurice de (1994). A Terrible Revenge: The Ethnic Cleansing of the East European Germans, 1944–1950. New York: St. Martin's Press.

=== Fugitive war criminals ===
- Breitman, Richard; Goda, Norman J. W. (2010). Hitler's Shadow: Nazi War Criminals, U.S. Intelligence, and the Cold War. Washington D.C.: National Archives and Records Administration.

=== Liberated territories ===
- Beevor, Antony; Cooper, Artemis (1994). Paris After the Liberation, 1944–1949. New York: Doubleday.

=== Postwar occupation ===
==== Germany ====
- Bacque, James (1997). Crimes and Mercies: The Fate of German Civilians under Allied Occupation, 1944–1950. London: Warner Books.
- Halder, Winfrid (2002). Deutsche Teilung: Vorgeschichte und Anfangsjahre der doppelten Staatsgründung (in German). Pendo. ISBN 978-3-85842-552-2.
- Jarausch, Konrad H. (2006). After Hitler: Recivilizing Germans, 1945–1995. Oxford University Press. ISBN 978-0-195-12779-9.
- Jähner, Harald (2022). Aftermath: Life in the Fallout of the Third Reich, 1945-1955. Knopf. ISBN 978-0-59-3319-734.
- MacDonogh, Giles (2009). After the Reich: The Brutal History of the Allied Occupation. New York: Basic Books.
- Merritt, Anna J. (1969). Public opinion in occupied Germany: the OMGUS surveys, 1945–1949. University of Illinois Press.
- Naimark, Norman M. (1995). The Russians in Germany: A History of the Soviet Zone of Occupation, 1945–1949. Cambridge, Massachusetts: Harvard University Press.
- Slaveski, Filip (2013). The Soviet Occupation of Germany: Hunger, Mass Violence, and the Struggle for Peace, 1945–1947. Cambridge University Press. ISBN 978-1-107-04381-7.

==== Japan ====
- Dower, John W (1999). Embracing Defeat: Japan in the Wake of World War II. New York: W.W. Norton & Co.

=== War crimes trials ===
==== Germany ====
- Conot, Robert E. (2000). Justice at Nuremberg. New York: Carroll & Graf Publishers.
- International Military Tribunal (1947–1949). Trial of the Major War Criminals before International Military Tribunal. Vol. 1–42.

==== Japan ====
- Maga, Timothy P. (2001). Judgment at Tokyo: The Japanese War Crimes Trials. Lexington: University Press of Kentucky.

== Direct accounts and primary literature ==
=== Diaries, letter collections, transcripts of private conversations ===
The following lists should include diaries or letter collections written (at least partially) during World War II. The list should be focussed on works that were written during the war for either personal or restricted private consumption, and without authorial intent for widespread publication.

==== Civilians ====
===== Belgium, civilian diaries =====
- Brusselmans, Anne (1954). Rendez-vous 127: The Diary of Madame Brusselmans, M.B.E., September 1940 – September 1944. London: Benn.

===== Germany, civilian diaries =====
- Hillers, Marta (2005). A Woman in Berlin. London: Virago. — Initially published anonymously; deals intensively with the rape of German women by Soviet troops.
- Kardorff, Ursula v. (1965). Diary of a Nightmare: Berlin 1942–1945. London: Hart-Davis.
- Klemperer, Victor (1995). Nowojski, Walter; Klemperer, Hadwig (eds.). "Ich will Zeugnis ablegen bis zum letzten." Tagebücher 1933–1945 (in German). Vol. 1–8.
- Studnitz, Hans-Georg v. (1964). While Berlin burns: the diary of Hans-Georg von Studnitz, 1943–1945. London: Weidenfeld & Nicolson.

===== Netherlands, civilian diaries =====
- Frank, Anne (1997) [1944]. Diary of a Young Girl: Anne Frank. Bantam. ISBN 978-0-553-57712-9.

===== United Kingdom, civilian diaries =====
- Shipley, Paul; et al. (comp.) (1943). Bristol siren nights: diaries and stories of the blitzes. Bristol: Rankin.

===== United States, civilian diaries =====
- Shirer, William L. (1941). Berlin Diary: The Journal of a Foreign Correspondent, 1934–1941. London: Hamilton.
- Smedley, Agnes (1943). Battle Hymn of China. New York: Alfred A. Knopf.
- Tregaskis, Richard (1943). Guadalcanal Diary. New York: Random House.

==== Military ====
===== Australia, military diaries =====
- Ackland, John; Ackland, Richard, eds. (1944). Word from John: An Australian Soldier's Letters to his Friends. Melbourne: Cassell.

===== Canada, military diaries =====
- Clegg, Howard (1942). A Canuck in England: Journal of a Canadian soldier. London: Harrap.

===== Germany, military diaries =====
- Böll, Heinrich (2001). Briefe aus dem Krieg 1939–1945 [Letters from the War 1939–1945] (in German). Cologne: Kiepenhauer & Witsch.
- Halder, Franz (1947). War Journal of Franz Halder. Vol. 1–8. United States: A.G. EUCOM.

===== United Kingdom, military diaries =====
- Brooke, Alan (2001). Danchev, Alex; Todman, Daniel (eds.). War Diaries, 1939–1945. Berkeley: Univ. of California Press.
- Dunford Wood, Colin (2020). Dunford Wood, James (ed.). The War Diaries of Colin Dunford Wood: Volume 1, 1939–41, North-West Frontier, India & Iraq. London: Kensington Square. ISBN 978-1-83853-848-4.
- Middlebrook, Martin, ed. (1985). The Bomber Command War Diaries. London: Viking.
- Langstaff, C. K. (1943). Diary of a driver with the R.A.S.C., in Britain and France, 1939–1940. London: Epworth.
- Offenburg, Jean H. M. (1956). Lonely Warrior: The Journal of a Battle of Britain Fighter Pilot. London: Souvenir.
- Pownall, Sir Henry (1972). Bond, Brian (ed.). The Diaries of Sir Henry Pownall. London: Leo Cooper.
- Seaven, Michael (1943). Hell and high altitude!: the thoughts, letters and diary notes of a pilot in the Bomber Command, R.A.F. London: Methuen.

===== United States, military diaries =====
- Litoff, Judy Barett; Smith, David C., eds. (1994). We're in this War Too: World War II Letters from Women in Uniform. New York: Oxford University Press.

==== Politicians, political leaders, diplomats ====
===== Canada, politician diaries =====
- King, William L. M. (2006). The Diaries of William Lyon Mackenzie King. Ottawa: Library and Archives Canada.

===== France, politician diaries =====
- Baudouin, Paul (1948). Private Diaries: March 1940–January 1941. London: Eyre & Spottiswoode.

===== Germany, politician diaries =====
- Bormann, Martin; Bormann, Gerda (1954). The Bormann letters: the private correspondence between Martin Bormann and his wife from January 1943 to April 1945. London: Weidenfeld & Nicolson.
- Goebbels, Joseph (1992). Reuth, Ralf Georg (ed.). Joseph Goebbels Tagebücher 1924–1945 (in German). Piper Verlag. ISBN 3-492-21411-8.
- Hitler, Adolf (2000) [1953]. Trevor-Roper, Hugh (ed.). Hitler's Table Talk: 1941–1944. London: Enigma Books. ISBN 1-929631-05-7.

===== Italy, politician diaries =====
- Ciano, Galeazzo (1945). Ciano's Hidden Diary, 1937–1938. Garden City, New York: Doubleday.
- Ciano, Galeazzo (1946). Wilson, Hugh (ed.). The Ciano Diaries: 1939–1943. New York: Doubleday.

===== Soviet Union, politician diaries =====
- Maisky, Ivan (2015). Gorodetsky, Gabriel (ed.). The Maisky Diaries: Red Ambassador to the Court of St James's 1932–1943. Yale University Press. ISBN 978-0-300-18067-1.

== Study aides and tertiary literature ==
=== Atlases ===
- Black, Jeremy (2020). A History of the Second World War in 100 Maps. University of Chicago Press. ISBN 978-0-226-75765-0.
- Brown, Ernest F. (1946). The War in Maps: An Atlas of the New York Times. London: Oxford University Press.
- Faulkner, Marcus & Wilkinson, Peter (2012). War at Sea: A Naval Atlas, 1939–1945. Annapolis, Maryland: Naval Institute Press.
- Folly, Martin H. (2004). The Palgrave Concise Historical Atlas of the Second World War. Palgrave. ISBN 978-1-4039-0286-3.
- Gilbert, Martin (2009). The Routledge Atlas of the Second World War. Routledge. ISBN 978-1-135-10788-8.
- Horrabin, James F. (1942–1946). An Atlas History of the Second Great War. Vol. 1–10. – 7 volumes are viewable at archive.org
- Hyslop, Stephen G.; Kagan, Neil (2018). Atlas of World War II: History's Greatest Conflict Revealed Through Rare Wartime Maps and New Cartography.
- Keegan, John, ed. (1989). The Times Atlas of the Second World War. New York: Harper & Row.
- Natkiel, Richard (1985). Atlas of World War II. Bison Books. ISBN 0-86124-208-4.
- Smurthwaite, David (2000). The Pacific War Atlas 1941–1945.
- Swanston, Alexander; Swanston, Malcolm (2014). The Historical Atlas of World War II.
- Young, Peter; Natkiel, Richard, eds. (2000). The Cassell Atlas of the Second World War.

=== Encyclopedias, dictionaries, and lexicons ===
The following list should include encyclopedias of World War II, i.e. reference works or compendiums containing multiple short entries that are sorted alphabetically.

- Baudot, Marcel; et al., eds. (1980) [First published 1977]. The Historical Encyclopedia of World War II. Translated by Dilson, Jesse. New York: Facts On File. ISBN 0-87196-401-5. LCCN 80020339. OCLC 20533793. OL 4105655M.
- Bishop, Chris, ed. (2002). The Encyclopedia of Weapons of World War II. New York: Metro Books.
- Chamberlain, Peter, ed. (1972). Encyclopedia of German Tanks of WW2. Bukupedia.
- Dahl, Hans Fredrik; Hjeltnes, Guri; Nøkleby, Berit; Ringdal, Nils Johan; Sørensen, Øystein, eds. (1995). Norsk krigsleksikon 1940–1945 [Norwegian War Encyclopedia 1940–1945] (in Norwegian). Oslo: J.W. Cappelens. OCLC 1028274521.
- Dunnigan, James (1998). The Pacific War Encyclopedia. New York: Checkmark Books.
- Feldman, George, ed. (2000). World War II Almanac. UXL. ISBN 978-0-7876-3832-0.
- Hogg, Ian V. (1996). Dictionary of World War II. Lincolnwood, Illinois: NTC Publishing.
- Keegan, John (1995). Who's Who In World War II. New York: Oxford University Press.
- Parrish, Thomas; Marshall, S. L. A. (1978). The Simon and Schuster Encyclopedia of World War II. New York: Simon & Schuster.
- Polmar, Norman; Allen, Thomas (1996). World War II: The Encyclopedia of the War Years, 1941–1945. New York: Random House.
- Sandler, Stanley, ed. (2005). World War II in the Pacific: An Encyclopedia. New York: Garland.
- Tucker, Spencer C., ed. (2016). World War II: The Definitive Encyclopedia and Document Collection. ABC Clio. ISBN 978-1-4408-4593-2.
- Tucker, Spencer; Roberts, Priscilla Mary, eds. (2005). World War II: A Student Encyclopedia. Vol. 1–5. Santa Barbara, California: ABC-CLIO.
- Zabecki, David, ed. (1999). World War II in Europe: An Encyclopedia. Vol. 2 volumes. New York: Routledge.

=== Source collections ===
The following list should include source collections, i.e. collections of primary documents or accounts about or in reference to World War II.

- Bigelow, Barbara C.; Slovey, Christine (2000). World War II: Primary Sources. Detroit: UXL.
- Goldstein, D. M.; Dillon, K. V., eds. (2004). The Pacific War Papers: Japanese Documents of World War II. Dulles, Virginia: Brasseys.
- Hitler, Adolf (1964). Trevor-Roper, Hugh (ed.). Hitler's War Directives, 1939–1945. Sidgwick and Jackson.
- Tucker, Spencer C., ed. (2016). World War II: The Definitive Encyclopedia and Document Collection. ABC Clio. ISBN 978-1-4408-4593-2.
- Woolridge, E. T., ed. (1993). Carrier Warfare in the Pacific: An Oral History Collection. Washington D.C.: Smithsonian Institution Press.
- Wagner, Stephen; Wagner, Sharon Wells (2008). Ordinary Heroes: Untold Stories of World War II. Booksurge.

=== Bibliographies ===
This list should include bibliographies, i.e. listings of books, about World War II.

- Bird, Keith W. (1985). German Naval History: A Guide to the Literature. New York & London: Garland Publishing.
- Enser, A. G. S (1977). A Subject Bibliography of the Second World War: Books in English, 1939–1974. Andre Deutsch.
- Enser, A. G. S (1985). A Subject Bibliography of the Second World War: Books in English, 1975–1983. Andre Deutsch.
- Enser, A. G. S (1990). A Subject Bibliography of the Second World War, and Aftermath: Books in English, 1975–1987. Andre Deutsch.
- Homze, Edward L. (1984). German Military Aviation: A Guide to the Literature. New York & London: Garland Publishing.
- Loyd, E. Lee, ed. (1997). World War II in Europe, Africa, and the Americas, with General Sources: A Handbook of Literature and Research. Greenwood Press. ISBN 0-313-29325-2.
- Loyd, E. Lee, ed. (1998). World War II in Asia and the Pacific and the War's aftermath, with General Themes: A Handbook of Literature and Research. Greenwood Press. ISBN 978-0-313-29326-9.
- Tuider, Othmar (1984). Bibliographie zur Geschichte der Felddivisionen der Deutschen Wehrmacht und Waffen-SS: 1939–1945 [Bibliography of the History of Field Divisions of the German Wehrmacht and Waffen-SS: 1939–1945] (in German). Vol. 1–2. Vienna: Heeresgeschichtliches Museum.

== See also ==
- Bibliography of Eisenhower, Dwight D.
- Bibliography of Hitler, Adolf
- Bibliography of the Holocaust
- Bibliography of the Holocaust in Greece
- Bibliography of Nazi Germany
- Bibliography of Poland during World War II
- Bibliography of Roosevelt, Franklin D.
- Bibliography of Roosevelt, Eleanor
- Bibliography of the Soviet Union during World War II
- Bibliography of Stalinism and the Soviet Union
- Bibliography of Truman, Harry S.
