= Cameron Forbes =

Cameron Forbes may refer to:

- William Cameron Forbes (1870–1959), American investment banker and diplomat
- Cameron Forbes (writer), Australian journalist and author
