= Kent Greenfield =

Kent Greenfield may refer to:

- Kent Greenfield (law professor), American lawyer
- Kent Greenfield (baseball) (1902–1978), pitcher in Major League Baseball
- Kent Roberts Greenfield (1893-1967), American historian
