= Hailstorm over Truk Lagoon =

1982 book by Klaus Lindemann

- Author: Klaus Lindemann
- Genre: Non-fiction
- Publication date: 1982

Hailstorm over Truk Lagoon is a book by Klaus Lindemann about the shipwrecks of Truk lagoon. The wrecks were caused by Operation Hailstone, a US Navy aerial attack on the Japanese-held islands of the lagoon on 17 and 18 February 1944. American naval forces neutralized the lagoon's offensive capacity but did not try to capture it; instead they leapfrogged the islands and captured the Mariana Islands, which were within bomber range of Japan.
