= Carolle J. Carter =

American historian (born 1934)

- Born: July 1934 (age 92)
- Occupation: Historian
- Writing career
- Pen name: Carolle J. Carter

Carolle J. Kitchens, who writes as Carolle J. Carter, (born July 1934) is an American historian who has written on German espionage in Ireland during World War II (1977) and on American liaison with Chinese communists in 1944–47 (1997). She has taught at Menlo College and Foothill Community College in California as well as San Jose State University and San Jose City College.

== Selected publications ==
- The Shamrock and the Swastika: German Espionage in Ireland in World War II. Pacific Books, Palo Alto, 1977. ISBN 0870152211
- "John P. Duggan. Neutral Ireland and the Third Reich", The American Historical Review, Vol. 93, No. 1 (Feb., 1988), pp. 158–159.
- Mission to Yenan: American Liaison with the Chinese Communists, 1944-1947. University Press of Kentucky, 1997.
