= The Best War Ever =

Book by Michael C. C. Adams

The Best War Ever: America and World War II
- Author: Michael C. C. Adams
- Language: English
- Series: The American Moment
- Subject: History, World War II
- Genre: Non-fiction
- Publisher: Johns Hopkins University Press (US)
- Publication date: 2012
- Publication place: United States
- Media type: Print (Hardback)
- Pages: 208 pp
- ISBN: 978-0-8018-4697-7
- OCLC: 28063778
- Dewey Decimal: 940.53/73 20
- LC Class: D769 .A56 1994

The Best War Ever: America and World War II is a revisionist history book written by Dr. Michael C. C. Adams (professor of history at Northern Kentucky University). The book was and first published by the Johns Hopkins University press in 1993 as part of its "American Moment" series, edited by University of Wisconsin–Madison history professor Stanley I. Kutler. In a 2004 survey of American college history instructors, the book was voted #2 in the "most likely to plagiarize" category, finishing just behind Amusing the Million by John Kasson.

== Main thesis and arguments ==
Adams argues that the historical memory of America's involvement in World War II has been sanitized and replaced by a common set of misconceptions that borders on folklore. Adams specifically cites television programs and motion pictures that have popularized the war as a morally just, popularly supported conflict in which the Allies became the heroes and the Axis powers, most notably the Nazis and the Japanese, became villains. In this trope, all returning servicemen came back well-adjusted and suffered no mental illness, racial tensions did not exist, and all American soldiers fought with valor and honor. Adams contrasts the idea of the "Best War Ever" with the mythology surrounding the Vietnam War and concludes that the juxtaposition of these two military engagements and their striking differences help reinforce the popular notions surrounding World War II.

== Reception ==
Professional historians lauded Adams for his willingness to challenge stereotypes surrounding the war. J.T. Hansen, writing in the Journal of American History, said that the book should be "required reading for the writers of jingoistic accounts of World War II.

Temple University professor David Farber also praised Adams for his clear writing style and his comparison of actor John Wayne, one of the most recognizable symbols of American bravery in World War II movies, with Ronald Reagan, a president who, according to Adams, used the World War II mythology to justify his policies and political style while in office. Overall, the reviews in the major historical journals were very favorable.

== Anecdotes ==
Adams lists a number of historical anecdotes as evidence to his overarching arguments. These include:

The Ball Gunner

Adams takes issue with the glamorization of the "ball gunners," the crew members on B-17 missions who operated the bottom turret guns. Adams uses a magazine advertisement to illustrate the romantic view of the war that advertisers and the American government portrayed at home. A copy of a magazine ad featured the ball gunner under the headline "Giving 'Em Hell in a Goldfish Bowl." Adams contrasts this with the poem The Death of the Ball Turret Gunner by Randall Jarrell, which depicts the gruesome death of a ball gunner who was literally blown to bits by a shrapnel explosion.

== List of chapters ==
1. Mythmaking and the War
2. No Easy Answers
3. The Patterns of War, 1939-1945
4. The American War Machine
5. Overseas
6. Home Front Change
7. A New World

== See also ==
- World War II
- American History
