= A Keen Soldier =

Non-fiction book

- Book cover, first edition
- Author: Andrew Clark
- Language: English
- Publisher: Knopf Canada
- Publication date: 22 October 2002
- ISBN: 978-0676973549

A Keen Soldier: The Execution of Second World War Private Harold Pringle by Andrew Clark is a historical study of the only execution of a Canadian soldier for military crimes committed during the Second World War. Harold Pringle was executed for murder shortly after the conclusion of the war in Europe. A Keen Soldier was published by Vintage Canada in 2002. It was a finalist for Canada's Governor General's Literary Award for non-fiction in 2003.
