= The Patriotic Traitors =

1972 book by David Littlejohn

- Author: David Littlejohn
- Language: English, German
- Genre: History
- Publisher: Heinemann
- Publication date: 1972
- Publication place: United Kingdom
- Pages: 391 pp
- ISBN: 0-434-42725-X
- OCLC: 475283
- Dewey Decimal: 940.53/163
- LC Class: D802.A2 L57

The Patriotic Traitors: A History of Collaboration in German-Occupied Europe, 1940–45 is a book written by David Littlejohn in 1975. It is a history of the Europeans who took part in collaborationism with Nazi Germany. Individual chapters are devoted to Norway, Denmark, the Netherlands, Belgium, France and the Soviet Union.

Littlejohn was later critiqued by the Belarusian author Leonid Rein in his work The Kings and the Pawns for supposedly attributing "all collaboration during World War II to fascist and fascist-like parties".

== See also ==
- Non-Germans in the German armed forces during World War II
- Wehrmacht foreign volunteers and conscripts
- Waffen-SS foreign volunteers and conscripts
