= James L. Cate =

James Lea Cate (November 16, 1899 – November 1, 1981) was a professor of history at the University of Chicago, an intelligence officer in the United States Army Air Forces with the rank of major, and part of the Air Force Historical Division during World War II. He authored at least two pieces of Air Force literature, one titled Origins of the Eighth Air Force: Plans, Organization, Doctrines, the other titled History of the Twentieth Air Force: Genesis. The former is 143 pages in length, while the latter is 298 pages. Both were classified at the time of their writing, but declassified in 1958.

From 1945 to 1958, with former AAF lieutenant colonel Wesley Frank Craven, an historian with New York University and Princeton, Cate was managing editor of the seven-volume history of the AAF, The Army Air Forces in World War II.

After the bombing of Hiroshima, Cate, as historical officer of the Twentieth Air Force from June 1944, received a letter from President Harry S. Truman which provided a lengthy justification for the dropping of the first atomic bombs ever to be used in warfare, Little Boy and Fat Man.

He received the Quantrell Award.

He is the grandfather of cartoonist Daniel Clowes.
