= The Army Air Forces in World War II =

1948–1958 series by Wesley Frank Craven and James Lea Cate

The Army Air Forces in World War II is a seven-volume work describing the actions of the United States Army Air Corps (USAAC), and from June 1941 the United States Army Air Forces (AAF) that succeeded it, between January 1939 and August 1945. It was published between 1948 and 1958 by the University of Chicago Press under the auspices of the Office of Air Force History. The series editors were Wesley Frank Craven and James Lea Cate.

== Background ==
In June 1942, the Chief of the Air Staff directed that an historian be appointed to record the military operations of the USAAC. In July a similar position was created to provide an administrative history. Both efforts were placed in the Historical Division of the Office of the Assistant Chief of Air Staff, Intelligence. The officer in charge, Colonel Clanton W. Williams of the University of Alabama, held a succession of titles which culminated in AAF historian editors Craven and Cate equate his duties to those of a university dean.

Williams directed the recruitment and placement of historians in the Air Staff and at unit headquarters worldwide. The Air Staff and he determined that,

the job should be entrusted only to professionally qualified personnel [who would] have full access to all AAF records necessary [...].

Most were not professional military men but academics who were already serving in the AAF. Of necessity, their focus during the war was "selection and collection of materials" though they were often involved in producing action reports and unit history monographs. The Historical Office determined that the final effort,

should be scholarly in tone [and] should be addressed to those readers who have a serious interest in the study of the air war [...].

Furthermore, the office decided that the seven-volume format listed below was both necessary and appropriate for a thorough treatment of the subject.

== Post-war ==
After V-J Day the Historical Office was moved from Intelligence to be a special staff office. The Historical Office approached Craven and Cate to oversee the history project. Craven, then a Lieutenant Colonel in the AAF, was on leave from the faculty of New York University. Cate, then a Major, had come to the AAF from the University of Chicago. They agreed on the condition that they would be given a free hand in editorial decisions and access to all pertinent materials, a requirement which they state "has been lived up to in letter and in spirit". The University of Chicago agreed with similar conditions to sponsor and publish the work.

The seven volumes are in effect a collection of essays. Craven and Cate recruited 32 authors to write chapters or whole sections and also wrote several chapters themselves. Most of the authors had served in the AAF during the war and had returned to their college and university faculties after it. A few were professional officers with academic training. Craven and Cate note that "they have written as present scholars rather than as former Air Corps officers".

Though the series has the appearance of an official history, Craven and Cate emphasize that is "not an official report in the ordinary sense of that term – one to which the Air Staff necessarily subscribes in all its details and final conclusions".

== Contents ==
The seven volumes and their publication dates are:

- Wesley Frank Craven; James Lea Cate, eds. (1983) [1948]. Plans and Early Operations: January 1939 to August 1942 (PDF). The Army Air Forces in World War II. Vol. 1. Chicago: University of Chicago Press. ISBN 0-912799-03-X. Wikidata Q131294027.
- Wesley Frank Craven; James Lea Cate, eds. (1983) [1949]. Europe: Torch to Pointblank: August 1942 to December 1943 (PDF). The Army Air Forces in World War II. Vol. 2. Chicago: University of Chicago Press. ISBN 0-912799-03-X. Wikidata Q131294354.
- Wesley Frank Craven; James Lea Cate, eds. (1983) [1951]. Europe: Argument to V-E Day: January 1944 to May 1945 (PDF). The Army Air Forces in World War II. Vol. 3. Chicago: University of Chicago Press. ISBN 0-912799-03-X. Wikidata Q131294498.
- Wesley Frank Craven; James Lea Cate, eds. (1983) [1950]. The Pacific: Guadalcanal to Saipan: August 1942 to July 1944 (PDF). The Army Air Forces in World War II. Vol. 4. Chicago: University of Chicago Press. ISBN 0-912799-03-X. Wikidata Q131294615.
- Wesley Frank Craven; James Lea Cate, eds. (1983) [1953]. The Pacific: Matterhorn to Nagasaki: June 1944 to August 1945 (PDF). The Army Air Forces in World War II. Vol. 5. Chicago: University of Chicago Press. ISBN 0-912799-03-X. Wikidata Q131294712.
- Wesley Frank Craven; James Lea Cate, eds. (1983) [1955]. Men and Planes (PDF). The Army Air Forces in World War II. Vol. 6. Chicago: University of Chicago Press. ISBN 0-912799-03-X. Wikidata Q131294749.
- Wesley Frank Craven; James Lea Cate, eds. (1983) [1958]. Services Around the World (PDF). The Army Air Forces in World War II. Vol. 7. Chicago: University of Chicago Press. ISBN 0-912799-03-X. Wikidata Q131294799.

A companion volume, Combat Chronology 1941–1945, was compiled by Kit C. Carter and Robert Mueller and jointly published in 1973 by the Albert F. Simpson Historical Research Center of the Air University and the Office of Air Force History, Headquarters USAF.

- Kit C. Carter; Robert Mueller (1991) [1973]. Combat Chronology 1941–1945. The Army Air Forces in World War II. Washington, D.C.: Center for Air Force History. ISBN 0-912799-68-4. LCCN 92115046. OCLC 231661533. OL 8320961M. Wikidata Q131293822.

== General references ==
- Fuller, Curtis (August 1948). "The Library: The Army Air Forces in World War II, Volume One". Flying. p. 48. ISSN 0015-4806.
- Millett, John D. (June 1949). "Review: The Army Air Forces in World War II. Vol I". Political Science Quarterly. 64 (2). The Academy of Political Science: 292–295. doi:10.2307/2144236. JSTOR 2144236.
- Knappen, Marshall (December 1949). "Reviews of Books: The Army Air Force in World War II. Vols. I and II". The Journal of Modern History. 22 (2). University of Chicago Press. doi:10.1086/237344.
- Smith, Charles Edward (February 1950). "Book Reviews: The Army Air Forces in World War II". The Mississippi Valley Historical Review. 36 (4). Oxford University Press: 744–746. doi:10.2307/1895580. hdl:2027/uiug.30112004641962. JSTOR 1895580.
- Ransom, Harry (January 1951). "Review: The Army Air Forces in World War II. Vol. IV". The Southwestern Historical Quarterly. 54 (3). Texas State Historical Association: 380–383. JSTOR 30237597.
- Watts, Arthur P. (March 1951). "Review: The Army Air Forces in World War II. Vol. IV". The Annals of the American Academy of Political and Social Science. 274 (1). SAGE Publications: 216–217. doi:10.1177/000271625127400140.
- Watts, Arthur P. (November 1953). "Review: The Army Air Forces in World War II. Vol. V". The Annals of the American Academy of Political and Social Science. 290 (1). SAGE Publications: 196–197. doi:10.1177/000271625329000145. S2CID 144379368.
- Norman, Albert (December 1953). "Reviews of Books: The Army Air Forces in World War II. Vol. III". The Journal of Modern History. 26 (2). University of Chicago Press: 201–. doi:10.1086/237701.
- Buchanan, Russell (1953). "Review: The Army Air Forces in World War II, Vol. V". Pacific Historical Review. 22 (4). University of California Press: 412–414. doi:10.2307/4492114. JSTOR 4492114.

== Sources ==
- Wesley Frank Craven; James Lea Cate, eds. (1983) [1948], Plans and Early Operations: January 1939 to August 1942 (PDF), The Army Air Forces in World War II, vol. 1, Chicago: University of Chicago Press, ISBN 0-912799-03-X, Wikidata Q131294027
- Kit C. Carter; Robert Mueller (1991) [1973], Combat Chronology 1941–1945, The Army Air Forces in World War II, Washington, D.C.: Center for Air Force History, ISBN 0-912799-68-4, LCCN 92115046, OCLC 231661533, OL 8320961M, Wikidata Q131293822
