= Traitor Draža Mihailović =

Traitor Draža Mihailović: In the Hands of the Authority of People's Power is a book by communist Yugoslav figure Aleksandar Ranković written about the trial of World War II Chetnik leader Draža Mihailović that denounces Mihailović.
