= Hellfire (book) =

Book by Cameron Forbes

Hellfire: The Story of Australia, Japan and the Prisoners of War
- First edition cover
- Author: Cameron Forbes
- Language: English
- Genre: History
- Publisher: Macmillan Publishers
- Publication date: 2005
- Publication place: Australia
- Media type: Print (hardcover)
- Pages: 559
- ISBN: 1-4050-3650-8

Hellfire: The Story of Australia, Japan and the Prisoners of War is a history book written by Australian journalist and author Cameron Forbes published by Macmillan Publishers in 2005. It tells the stories of Australian prisoners of war of the Japanese during the Second World War, with particular focus on the Burma Railway.

== Publication ==
- Forbes, Cameron (28 September 2023). Hellfire: The Story of Australia, Japan and the Prisoners of War (2005 ed.). Macmillan Publishers. ISBN 978-1-4050-3650-4. Total pages: 559.
