= Cameron Forbes (writer) =

Australian journalist and author

Cameron Forbes is an Australian journalist and author, born in Rockhampton in Queensland on 1 September 1938. He worked for The Age as Europe correspondent and became the newspaper's foreign editor in the early 1980s. In the late 1980s, Forbes was posted in Singapore as Asia correspondent. He was also Washington correspondent for The Australian from 1997 to 2000.

Forbes has reported from conflict zones in Northern Ireland, Portugal, the Middle East, Rwanda, Myanmar, Kashmir, Sri Lanka, Afghanistan and Bougainville.

He has interviewed Nelson Mandela, Desmond Tutu, Cardinal Sin, Prince Sihanouk, Rajiv Gandhi, Benazir Bhutto, Benjamin Netanyahu, Aung San Suu Kyi, Cory Aquino, George W. Bush, Bill Clinton and many other politicians, dignitaries, rebel leaders and insurgents, including members of the Taliban and the Tutsi rebel movement.

A highly-regarded journalist known for his perceptive overseas coverage, he has been the recipient of many awards, including:

- 1986 – Graham Perkin Australian Journalist of the Year Award
- 1990 – The Canadian Award for International Reporting
- 1991 – The United Nations Association Media Peace Award
- 2010 – Walkley Award for Most Outstanding Contribution to Journalism

Retiring from print journalism in 2002, he has written a number of non-fiction books, including Hellfire: The Story of Australia, Japan and the Prisoners of War.

== Books ==
- Hellfire: The Story of Australia, Japan and the Prisoners of War (Pan Macmillan, 2005)
- Under the Volcano: The Story of Bali (Black Inc., 2007)
- The Korean War: Australia in the Giants Playground (Pan Macmillan, 2010)
- Australia on Horseback: The story of the horse and the making of a nation (Pan Macmillan, 2014)
