= Kent Roberts Greenfield =

American historian (1893–1967)

Portrait of Greenfield at approximately 51 years old

Kent Roberts Greenfield (July 20, 1893, Chestertown, Maryland - 1967) was an American historian. He was a professor of history at Johns Hopkins University and chief architect of the official U.S. Army history of World War II. He is the author of 63 works in 277 publications in 4 languages.
