= Gothic Star =

Gothic Star was the name of two ships of the Blue Star Line.

- SS Gothic Star
- MV Gothic Star
