= MV Patagonia Star =

Patagonia Star was the name of two ships of the Blue Star Line.

- MV Patagonia Star (1939)
- MV Patagonia Star (1942)
