= SS Carmia =

Two ships of the Donaldson Atlantic Line were named Carmia:

- SS Carmia (1906), in service 1925–29
- SS Carmia (1943), in service 1946–54
