= Peter Gillman =

British writer

Peter Gillman (born 1942) is a British writer and journalist specialising (but not exclusively) in mountaineering topics. Many of his books are co-written, mainly with his wife Leni Gillman.

== Early life and education ==
Gillman attended Dulwich College (1953–61), and University College Oxford (1961–64). He was editor of The Isis Magazine at Oxford.

== Career ==
He joined the Weekend Telegraph as a feature writer in 1965. He subsequently spent fifteen years on the staff of the Sunday Times, including five years on the newspaper's Insight team. He became a freelance journalist in 1983 and has written for most British newspapers.

With Dougal Haston he co-authored the book, Direttissima; the Eiger Assault (1967), also published under the title Direttissima, which told the story of the ascent of the Eiger North Face in which John Harlin II lost his life.

Peter and Leni Gillman's 2000 book, The Wildest Dream, is a biography of the Everest climber George Mallory, and won the Boardman Tasker Prize for Mountain Literature in that year. It inspired the film of the same name, on which Peter and Leni Gillman were historical consultants.

Peter and Leni Gillman's 2015 book, Extreme Eiger, is an account of an ascent of the North Face of the Eiger in 1965, and won the Outdoor Book Award in the 2015 Awards for Excellence made by the Outdoor Writers and Photographers Guild.

== Works ==
Books

- Gillman, Peter, & Haston, Dougal (1967). Direttissima; the Eiger Assault, also published under the title Direttissima.
- Davenport, Elaine; Eddy, Paul & Gillman, Peter (1978). The Plumbat Affair. Futura Publications. ISBN 0-233-97016-9.
- Gillman, Peter (1978). Fitness on Foot: Climbing and Walking for Pleasure. Tadworth : World's Work : The Sunday Times.
- Gillman, Peter & Gillman, Leni (1980). Collar the lot!: How Britain Interned and Expelled Its Wartime Refugees. London; New York: Quartet Books.
- Gillman, Peter & Gillman, Leni (1987). Alias David Bowie: A Biography. New York: H. Holt.
- Gillman, Peter & Hamann, Paul (1987). The Duty Men: The Inside Story of the Customs. London: BBC Books.
- Gillman, Peter (1989). In balance: Twenty years of mountaineering journalism. London: Hodder and Stoughton.
- Gillman, Peter & Salkeld, Audrey (1993). Everest: The Best Writing and Pictures from Seventy Years of Human Endeavour. Boston: Little, Brown.
- Gillman, Peter & Gillman, Leni (2000). The Wildest Dream: The Biography of George Mallory. Seattle, WA: The Mountaineers.
- Gillman, Peter & Gillman, Leni (2001). Everest: Eighty Years of Triumph and Tragedy. Boston; London: Little, Brown.
- Gillman, Peter & Gillman, Leni (2015). Extreme Eiger. London: Simon and Schuster.
- Gillman, Peter & Midolo, Emanuele (2025). Murder in Cairo: The Killing of David Holden. London: Biteback.

=== Selected articles ===
- Gillman, Peter & Gillman, Leni (June 21, 1992). "HOAX: Secrets that Truman Capote took to the grave". The Sunday Times Magazine.
- Gillman, Peter (February 17, 2013). "The truth about Truman Capote" (PDF). The Sunday Times Magazine. Archived from the original on March 4, 2016.
