= David Holden (journalist) =

British journalist (1924–1977)

David Shipley Holden (20 November 1924 – 7 December 1977) was a British journalist and purported double agent, best known as the chief foreign correspondent for The Sunday Times, specialising in Middle-Eastern affairs, from 1965. He was murdered in Cairo, Egypt.

His editor, Harold Evans, assigned six of his journalists to investigate the murder in the week following the killing. Three of those continued to investigate the murder during 1978, making multiple trips to the Middle East and the United States. They eventually wrote an internal report which was inconclusive in its findings, while suggesting that Holden had been involved with one or more intelligence services and was most likely killed by an Egyptian security group. In one of Evans' volumes of autobiography, My Paper Chase (2009), he described these events.

== Early life and education ==
Born in Sunderland, Tyne and Wear, North East England, he was educated at Great Ayton Friends' School in North Yorkshire, Emmanuel College, Cambridge, and Northwestern University, in Evanston, Illinois in the United States.

== Career ==
After a three-year stint as a schoolteacher in Scotland, Holden worked as a professional actor. He returned to North America, travelling as an odd-job man in the U.S. and Mexico. In 1955, he was recruited as an assistant correspondent in Washington, D.C. by The Times (London).

The following year, Holden transferred to the Middle East to cover the political and diplomatic crisis following the 1956 joint invasion of Egypt by Israel, France, and Britain.

As Middle East correspondent for The Times, he travelled throughout the Arab world for the next four years, then was named roving correspondent. In 1961 he joined The Guardian with the same wide brief. In 1965 he became chief foreign correspondent of The Sunday Times and was serving in that position at the time of his death.

In addition to his journalism, Holden wrote two books: Farewell to Arabia (1966) and Greece Without Columns (1972).

He began working on a third book, The House of Saud, about the Saudi royal family, in 1976. Before he could finish it, he was killed. The book was completed later by two other Middle-Eastern specialists, Richard Johns and James Buchan, both then with the Financial Times.

== Murder ==
When the peace talks were announced, Holden came off leave to attend them. He flew into Cairo several days early to cover the peace talks being initiated by Anwar Sadat, the Egyptian president, with Israel. Since the Six-Day War in 1967, Israel had occupied the Egyptian province of Sinai. Sadat was acting independently from the rest of the Arab world.

Since 1971, Sadat had been reducing relations with the USSR and had closed the cultural centres of the Soviet Union, East Germany, Hungary, and Czechoslovakia. He called for a conference to be convened at Mena House in Cairo from 14 December onward, for the meetings which would bring Israeli officials and their entourages, including security personnel, officially into an Arab country for the first time.

Holden decided to pay a quick visit to Israel, which still had no diplomatic or commercial relations with any Arab country. He flew to Amman. As Time magazine reported: "Holden told friends in Amman that he was going to make a detour to Jerusalem on his way [back] to Cairo. 'Haven't been there for years,' he said. 'I guess they consider me public enemy No. 1'.

After Holden failed to contact his home office as agreed from the hotel where he had booked to stay, The Sunday Times became concerned. On 7 December 1977, his body was found beside a road near a building site not far from the airport, “stripped of all means of identification”, so it was taken to the Cairo morgue. Police concluded that the victim "had died of a gunshot wound in the back earlier that morning." British officials finally discovered Holden's identity and claimed the body on 10 December.

He was killed with a single shot at close range. Three cars were found to be associated with the crime, all white Fiats: the car in which the murder took place, one which held his briefcase, identification and luggage, and another with papers. They were found abandoned in different parts of Cairo.

Police initially thought he had been killed by an illegal taxi driver. There was speculation that the killing was related to the peace talks, but no group took responsibility, which would usually be the case if it were meant as a protest or warning. At an early date, there was speculation that security forces might be involved.

The Sunday Times editor, Harold Evans, sent six of his own reporters to investigate during the week after the killing. Some of them worked on the case for six months, and eventually compiled an internal report for Evans, which was written by team-member Peter Gillman. Based on several pieces of information, such as learning that the CIA had a file on Holden and about his contacts with CIA agents, the journalists suggested that Holden had been involved with the CIA. They concluded that he had been killed by Egyptian security services, perhaps in collusion with the CIA. Harold Evans described the report and its conclusions in his 2009 book My Paper Chase.

In 2025 Gillman co-authored Murder in Cairo with journalist Emanuele Midolo which found that Holden had likely been a double agent for the CIA and KGB. They alleged that he was killed by the Egyptian State Security Investigations Service upon his arrival in Egypt. A summary of the book was published in the Sunday Times Magazine.

== Bibliography ==
- Harold Evans, My Paper Chase (2009), serialised in The Sunday Times
- Peter Gillman & Emanuele Midolo, Murder in Cairo: Solving a Cold War Spy Mystery. Biteback, 2025.
- Moscrop, Andrew. The Camel's Neighbour: Travel and Travellers in Yemen. Oxford, 2020. Pages 219 to 241.

== Sources ==
- 1. Holden's years there were 1939–1941. Founded in 1841, the school was dissolved in 1997. See Ayton Old Scholars' Association, Annual Report 2001, "News of Old Scholars," p. 3.
- 2. For basic biographical information, see Richard Johns, "Author's Preface and Acknowledgments" in David Holden, Richard Johns, and James Buchan, The House of Saud: The Rise and Rule of the Most Powerful Dynasty in the Arab World, (London: Sidgwick and Jackson, 1981), pp. xi–xiii and the publisher's biographical sketch on the original dust jacket.
- 3. For a treatment of these developments as seen at first hand, see Ismail Fahmi, Negotiating for Peace in the Middle East (London and Canberra: Croom Helm, 1983), pp. 233–301. Fahmi, Egypt's foreign minister, had resigned on 17 November.
- 4. See Moustafa Ahmed, ed., Egypt in the 20th Century: Chronology of Major Events. (London: MegaZette Press, 2003), pp. 304–305.
- 5. "Press: Murder in Cairo," Time, 26 December 1977.
- 6. Not five or six hours later, as claimed in some reports, which apparently confused the time of death with the time of the discovery of the body and its removal to the morgue. See [Humphrey Trevelyan] Lord Trevelyan, Foreword to David Holden, Richard Johns, and James Buchan, The House of Saud, p. v]. Trevelyan had known Holden since 1956, when he was ambassador to Egypt.
- 7. Richard Johns, op. cit, p. xi.
- 9. Similar operations on Egyptian soil have been the assassination of Lord Moyne in Cairo on 6 November 1944 by members of Lehi, the so-called Stern Gang. See Bowyer Bell, Terror Out of Zion: Irgun Zvai Leumi, LEHI, and the Palestine underground, 1929–1949. [New York: St Martin's Press], p. 92
- 10. See, for example, the Australian Associated Press-Reuters story "Cairo Inquiry into Killing," The Sydney Morning Herald, Tuesday 13 December 1977. p. 4.
- 11. Hirst's analysis of Sadat's reign is contained in the book he wrote with fellow correspondent Irene Beeson, Sadat (London: Faber and Faber, 1981).
