= SS Almeda Star =

British turbine steamer, 1926–1941

Coordinates: 58°10′N 13°24′W

History

United Kingdom
- Name: Almeda (1926–29); Almeda Star (1929–41)
- Owner: Blue Star Line
- Operator: Blue Star Line
- Port of registry: (United Kingdom) London
- Route: London – Rio de Janeiro – Buenos Aires
- Ordered: 1925
- Builder: Cammell Laird, Birkenhead
- Yard number: 919
- Launched: 29 June 1926
- Completed: December 1926
- Maiden voyage: 16 February 1927
- Identification: UK official number 149751; as built: code letters KVMH; after lengthening in 1935: Call sign GMTC
- Fate: Sunk 17 January 1941

General characteristics
- Type: Ocean liner & refrigerated ship
- Tonnage: as built: 12,848 GRT; tonnage under deck 9,354; 7,826 NRT; after lengthening in 1935: 15,935 GRT; tonnage under deck 12,358; 9,246 NRT
- Length: as built: 512.2 ft (156.1 m) after rebuild: 578.9 ft (176.4 m)
- Beam: 68.3 ft (20.8 m)
- Draught: 28 ft 1 in (8.56 m)
- Depth: as built: 34.0 ft (10.4 m); after rebuild: 42.7 ft (13.0 m)
- Installed power: as built: 2,078 NHP; after rebuild: 1,909 NHP
- Propulsion: as built: 5 boilers feeding 4 steam turbines driving 2 screw propellers after rebuild: boilers reduced from 5 to 4
- Speed: after rebuild: 16 knots (30 km/h)
- Capacity: passengers plus refrigerated cargo
- Crew: 136 crew plus (in wartime) 29 DEMS gunners
- Sensors & processing systems: direction finding equipment plus; (after 1935) echo sounding device
- Notes: sister ships: Andalucia Star, Arandora Star

SS Almeda Star, originally SS Almeda, was a British turbine steamer of the Blue Star Line. She was both an ocean liner and a refrigerated cargo ship, providing a passenger service between London and South America and carrying refrigerated beef from South America to London. She was built in 1926, significantly enlarged in 1935 and sunk by enemy action in 1941.

== Building and early career ==
In 1925 Blue Star ordered a set of new liners for its new London – Rio de Janeiro – Buenos Aires route. Cammell Laird of Birkenhead built three sister ships: Almeda, Andalucia and Arandora. John Brown & Company of Clydebank built two: Avelona and Avila. Together the quintet came to be called the "luxury five".

Cammell Laird launched Almeda on 29 June 1926 and completed her in December. She was launched under her original name of Almeda. As originally built she was 512.2 ft (156.1 m) long, had a beam of 68.3 ft (20.8 m) and a draught of 28 ft 1 in (8.56 m). She had 32 oil-fired corrugated furnaces with a combined grate area of 560 square feet (52 m^{2}) heating three double-ended and two single-ended boilers with a combined heating surface of 30,600 square feet (2,840 m^{2}). Her boilers supplied steam at 200 lb_{f}/in^{2} to four Parsons steam turbines with a combined rating of 2,078 NHP or 13,880 shp. Her four turbines were single-reduction geared onto the shafts to drive her twin propellers at about 120 RPM, giving her a speed of 16 knots (30 km/h).

Almeda was painted in Blue Star Line's standard livery of the era. Her hull was black, her boot-topping red and her masts white. Her stokehold ventilators were black and her deck ventilators were white, and the insides of her ventilator cowls were red. She had two funnels and they were red with a black top, with a narrow white and a narrow black band and on each side a large blue star on a white disc. In her original form Almeda's funnels had a type of cowl called an "Admiralty top".

Almeda made her maiden voyage on 16 February 1927, inaugurating Blue Star Line's route between London and Buenos Aires via Boulogne, Madeira, Tenerife, Rio de Janeiro, Santos and Montevideo. Her passage was scheduled to take 18 or 19 days.

In the course of 1927 Cammell Laird completed two sister ships, SS Andalucia and SS Arandora. In 1929 Arandora was converted into a cruise ship by reducing her cargo space and enlarging her passenger accommodation, and the three sisters were renamed Almeda Star, Andalucia Star and Arandora Star.

== Rebuilding ==
In 1935 Blue Star Line had Almeda Star and Andalucia Star lengthened by 66.7 ft (20.3 m) to 578.9 ft (176.4 m) to increase their cargo hold space. The new section in each ship was inserted forward of the accommodation block. The beam and draught remained the same but the depth was increased to 42.7 ft (13.0 m) and the original bow was replaced with a Maierform one. This design, pioneered by Austrian shipbuilding engineer Fritz Maier and developed by his son Erich Maier, had a convex profile that was intended to increase hydrodynamic efficiency.

Steaming arrangements were reduced to 28 corrugated furnaces with a combined grate area of 490 square feet (46 m^{2}) heating three double-ended boilers and one single-ended boiler with a combined heating surface of 26,680 square feet (2,479 m^{2}). The combined rating of her turbines was reduced to 1,909 NHP. A change more visible externally was that the Admiralty tops were removed from Almeda Star's two funnels.

== War service and sinking ==
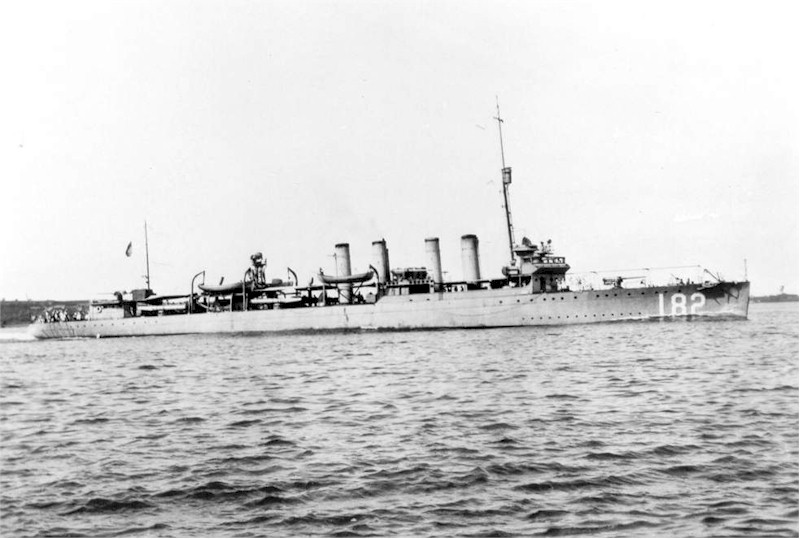
Seven destroyers including HMS St Albans searched for survivors of Almeda Star but found none. St Albans continued the search on 18 January but no trace of the Blue Star ship was found.

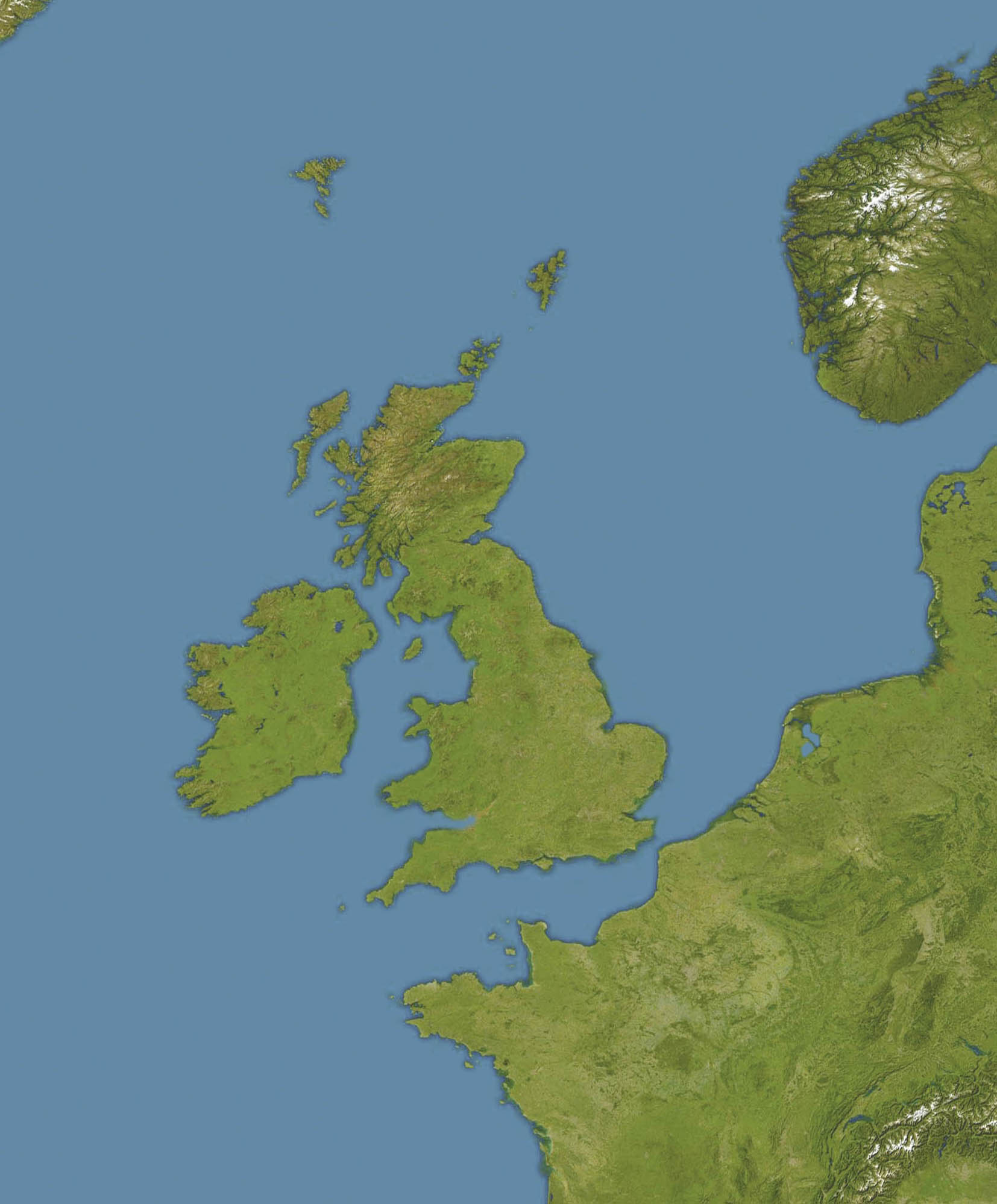
Approximate position of Almeda Star's wreck

After the Second World War broke out in September 1939 Almeda Star continued to sail her route independently of convoys. On 29 September 1939 off Rio de Janeiro she was met by the Royal Navy cruiser HMS Ajax, which was looking for British and Allied ships to escort northwards because of the threat of German raiders in the area.

On 22 December 1940 Almeda Star was on the River Mersey in Liverpool when she was slightly damaged in an air raid. On 15 January she sailed from Liverpool bound for the River Plate, carrying 194 passengers including 142 members of the Fleet Air Arm en route to RNAS Piarco on Trinidad. They were 21 officers and 121 ratings from 749, 750 and 752 squadrons.

Shipping between Britain and the Atlantic had to pass through the Western Approaches, so this area attracted a number of U-boat attacks. On the morning of 16 January, the day after Almeda Star sailed, German submarine U-96 had sunk the passenger liner Oropesa in the Western Approaches, killing 106 of the people aboard. At 0745 hrs on 17 January 1941 Almeda Star was about 35 nautical miles (65 km) north of Rockall in heavy seas when the same submarine, U-96 commanded by Kptlt Heinrich Lehmann-Willenbrock, hit her amidships with one G7e torpedo, causing Almeda Star to stop.

The ship did not immediately sink so U-96 fired again at 0805 and 0907 hrs, hitting Almeda Star in the stern and again amidships. The ship had launched four lifeboats but still had people on deck when U-96 surfaced and opened fire on her with her 88 mm deck gun. Between 0932 and 0948 hrs the submarine fired 28 incendiary shells, about 15 of which hit Almeda Star and started small fires aboard. The fires soon went out so at 0955 hrs U-96 hit the ship with a fourth torpedo, which exploded in her forepart. Within three minutes Almeda Star sank by her bow.

Almeda Star had transmitted one distress message and the Royal Navy responded by sending seven destroyers to search the area. They found neither survivors, boats nor wreckage: all 360 people aboard were lost, including those in the four lifeboats that had been launched. U-96 had been at the scene for more than two hours but escaped undetected.

== Sources and further reading ==
- "Thomas". Dictionary of American Naval Fighting Ships. Navy Department, Naval History and Heritage Command. pp. 137–138.
- Grove, Eric (2002). German Capital Ships and Raiders in World War II. Naval Staff Histories. Vol. I: From Graf Spee to Bismarck, 1939–1941. London: Routledge. p. xxi. ISBN 0714652083.
- Harnack, Edwin P (1938) [1903]. All About Ships & Shipping (7th ed.). London: Faber and Faber.
- "Taffrail" (Henry Taprell Dorling) (1973). Blue Star Line at War, 1939–45. London: W. Foulsham & Co. pp. 9, 40, 55–56, 60, 135. ISBN 0-572-00849-X.
- Talbot-Booth, E.C. (1942) [1936]. Ships and the Sea (Seventh ed.). London: Sampson Low, Marston & Co. Ltd.
