= SS Arandora Star =

British ship sunk by U-boat in 1940

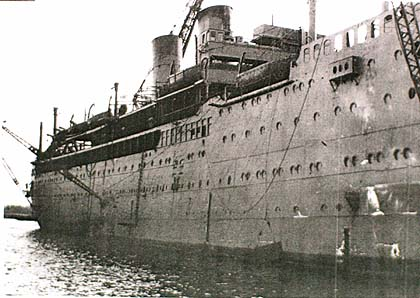
- Arandora Star as a troop ship in 1940

History
- Name: Arandora (1927–29) Arandora Star (1929–40)
- Owner: Blue Star Line
- Port of registry: London
- Route: London − South America As a cruise liner, she made voyages to Norway, northern capitals, the Mediterranean and the West Indies among other destinations
- Ordered: 1925
- Builder: Cammell Laird & Co, Birkenhead
- Yard number: 921
- Launched: 4 January 1927
- Completed: May 1927
- In service: 1927
- Out of service: 1940
- Refit: 1929 as cruise liner by Fairfield Shipbuilding & Engineering, Glasgow 1936 Main mast removed and accommodation extended to poop deck
- Nickname(s): "The Wedding Cake" or the "Chocolate Box", due to her paint scheme.
- Fate: Sunk 2 July 1940

General characteristics
- Type: Ocean liner and refrigerated cargo ship (1927–29); cruise liner (1929–39); troop ship (1940)
- Tonnage: as built: 12,847 GRT; 7,815 NRT; after refit: 14,694 GRT; 8,578 NRT
- Length: 512.2 ft (156.1 m)
- Beam: 68.3 ft (20.8 m)
- Height: as built: 34.0 ft (10.4 m); after refit: 42.5 ft (13.0 m)
- Decks: 7 decks
- Installed power: 2,078 NHP
- Propulsion: four steam turbines, single reduction geared onto two propeller shafts
- Speed: 16 knots (30 km/h; 18 mph)
- Capacity: Passengers: as built: 164 − 1st Class; as a cruise liner: 354 − 1st Class

SS Arandora Star, originally SS Arandora, was a British passenger ship of the Blue Star Line. She was built in 1927 as an ocean liner and refrigerated cargo ship, converted in 1929 into a cruise ship and requisitioned as a troopship in the Second World War. At the end of June 1940 she was assigned the task of deporting interned Anglo-Italian and Anglo-German civilians as well as a small number of legitimate prisoners of war to Canada. On 2 July 1940 she was sunk by a German U-boat off the coast of Ireland with a large loss of life, 805 people.

== Construction ==
In 1925 Blue Star ordered a set of new liners for its new London – Rio de Janeiro – Buenos Aires route. Cammell Laird of Birkenhead built three sister ships: Almeda, Andalucia and Arandora. John Brown & Company of Clydebank built two: Avelona and Avila. Together the quintet came to be called the "luxury five".

Cammell Laird launched Arandora on 4 January 1927 and completed her in May. As originally built she measured 12,847 gross register tons (GRT), was 512.2 feet (156.1 m) long, had a beam of 68.3 feet (20.8 m) and accommodated 164 first class passengers. She had a service speed of 16 knots (30 km/h). A major refit in 1929 reduced her cargo space and increased her passenger accommodation to turn her into a cruise ship.

== Peacetime service ==
As Arandora she sailed from London to the east coast of South America from 1927 to 1928. In 1929 she was sent to Fairfield Shipbuilding and Engineering Company Limited of Glasgow for refitting. In the refit, her gross tonnage was increased to 14,694 and first class accommodation was increased to 354 passengers. A tennis court was also placed aft of the funnels on the boat deck and a swimming pool was installed in the after well deck. Upon completion, she returned to service as a full-time luxury cruise ship. At the time of this refit, she was also renamed Arandora Star.

As a cruise ship Arandora Star was based mainly in Southampton, and voyaged to many different destinations, calling in some instances at home ports such as Immingham. Cruises included Norway, the Northern capitals, the Mediterranean, the West Indies, Panama, Cuba, and Florida. The ship's colour scheme of a white hull with scarlet ribbon gave rise to her nicknames of "The Wedding Cake" or "The Chocolate Box".

== Second World War service ==
When the Second World War broke out in September 1939, Arandora Star was en route from Cherbourg to New York. She returned to Britain via Halifax, Nova Scotia, where she joined the first HX series convoy, Convoy HX 1.

At the end of September, the Admiralty assessed the ship at Dartmouth, Devon and decided she was unsuitable for conversion to an armed merchant cruiser. In December, she was ordered to Avonmouth where she was fitted with the Admiralty Net Defence anti-torpedo system, consisting of underwater wire mesh suspended from booms either side of the ship. She was fitted out at Avonmouth and then spent three months based at Portsmouth testing nets of various gauges in the English Channel. On tests the system was successful at catching torpedoes and reduced Arandora Star's speed by only 1 knot (1.85 km/h). In March 1940, the ship was sent to Devonport where the equipment was removed. She was then sent to Liverpool for orders.

On 30 May, the ship left Liverpool for Norway to help evacuate Allied troops. She sailed unescorted to Harstad, where she embarked 1,600 personnel; most of them members of the Royal Air Force in addition to some French and Polish troops. She left Harstad on 7 June and took her evacuees to Glasgow.

On 14 June, the ship left Glasgow en route for Brest, in Brittany, to rescue troops and refugees, a part of Operation Aerial. Continuous Luftwaffe attacks on the port and town prevented her from entering, and only 12 refugees managed to get out by boat to the ship. Arandora Star escaped with the aid of a destroyer, which provided anti-aircraft cover and came under heavy air attack. The liner took her handful of evacuees to Falmouth, where she bunkered. She then went to Quiberon Bay, on the Bay of Biscay, where she evacuated about 300 people from Saint-Nazaire on 17 June. Sources disagree whether she took these to Falmouth or Plymouth. Arandora Star's trip to Saint-Nazaire was fairly uneventful; on the same day, Luftwaffe aircraft sank RMS Lancastria at the port killing several thousand people.

Arandora Star's next trip to France was to the southwest, near the border with Spain. There she found Bayonne under Luftwaffe attack, but assisted by a destroyer, she picked up about 500 people who were in an overloaded small craft adrift off the beach. These she took to Falmouth, before returning to the same area. She entered Saint-Jean-de-Luz, where some Polish troops were trapped. She embarked roughly 1,700 troops and refugees, including the Polish staff, and left just in time as Luftwaffe aircraft approached to bomb the town. She took her evacuees to Liverpool.

== Sinking ==
The Arandora Star's final voyage involved the deportation to Canada of Italian and German internees who had been detained under Defence Regulation 18B, as well as German prisoners of war. In Liverpool on 27–30 June, she embarked with 734 interned Italian men, 479 interned German men (including a number of Jewish refugees), 86 German prisoners of war, and 200 military guards, in addition to her crew of 174 officers and men. Her master was Captain Edgar Wallace Moulton. The ship was bound for St John's, Newfoundland, and her internees for Canadian internment camps.

Sources disagree as to whether the ship's departure from Liverpool was on 30 June, or at 4am on 2 July 1940. She sailed unescorted, and early on the morning of 2 July she was about 75 miles west of Bloody Foreland, Ireland, when she was torpedoed. U-47, commanded by Günther Prien, struck Arandora Star with a single torpedo. Prien believed the torpedo to be faulty, but it detonated against Arandora Star's starboard side, flooding her aft engine room. All engine room personnel, including two engineer officers, were killed. Her turbines, main generators and emergency generators were all immediately put out of action and therefore knocked out all lights and communications aboard.

Chief officer Frederick Brown gave the ship's position to the radio officer, who transmitted a distress signal. At 7:05 hours Malin Head radio acknowledged the message and retransmitted to Land's End and to Portpatrick.

=== Lifeboats ===
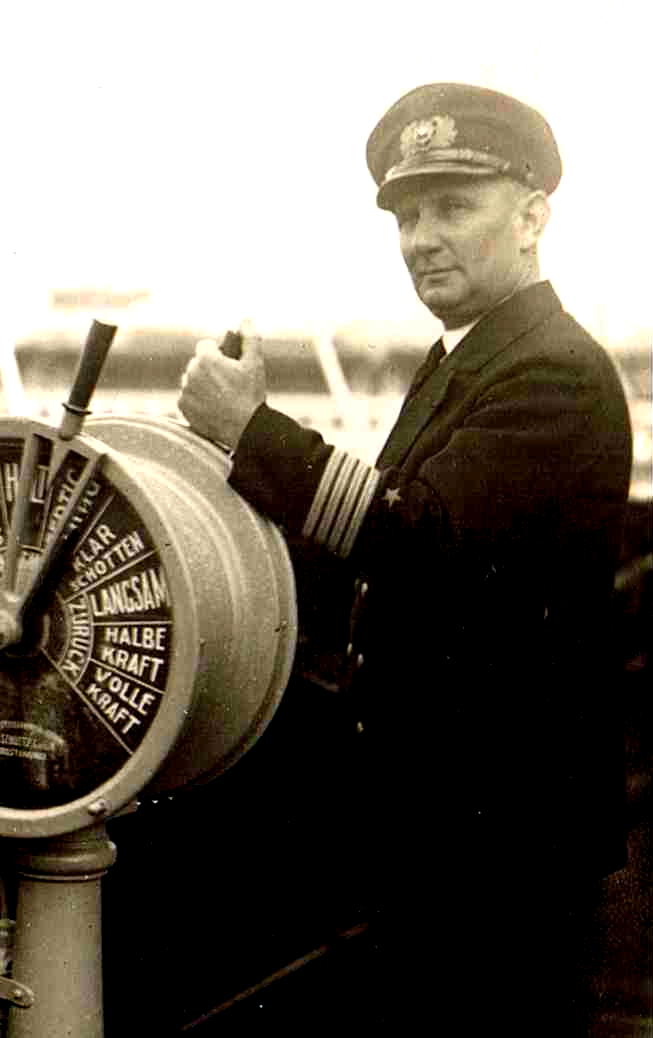
Otto Burfeind

The cruise ship carried 14 lifeboats and 90 liferafts. The torpedo destroyed one starboard lifeboat and disabled the davits and falls of another. Two lifeboats were damaged during their launch and thus useless. The crew successfully launched the remaining 10 lifeboats and more than half the liferafts. Some lifeboats were overloaded by prisoners descending the falls and side ladders, but many of the Italians were afraid to leave the ship. At least four of the remaining lifeboats were launched with a very small number of survivors. One other lifeboat was swamped and sank shortly after being launched.

One of the internees was Captain Otto Burfeind, who had been interned after scuttling his ship, the Adolph Woermann. Burfeind stayed aboard Arandora Star organising her evacuation until she sank and he was lost.

The ship listed further to starboard. At 7:15, Captain Moulton and his senior officers walked over the side into the rising water, leaving behind many Italians who were still afraid to leave the ship. At 7:20, the ship rolled over, raised her bow in the air and sank. 805 men were killed, including Captain Moulton, 12 of his officers, 42 of his crew and 37 of the military guards.

I could see hundreds of men clinging to the ship. They were like ants and then the ship went up at one end and slid rapidly down, taking the men with her… Many men had broken their necks jumping or diving into the water. Others injured themselves by landing on drifting wreckage and floating debris near the sinking ship.

— Sergeant Norman Price

=== Rescue ===
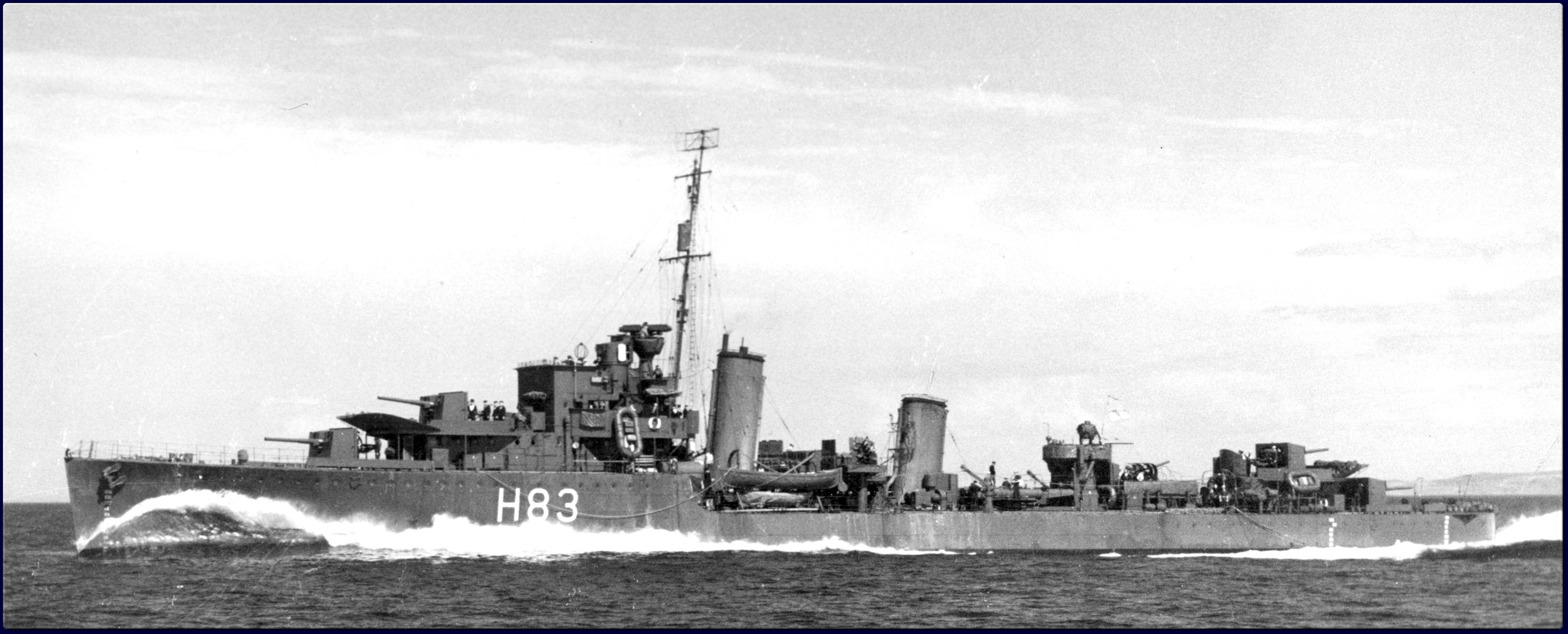
HMCS St. Laurent rescued 868 survivors from Arandora Star

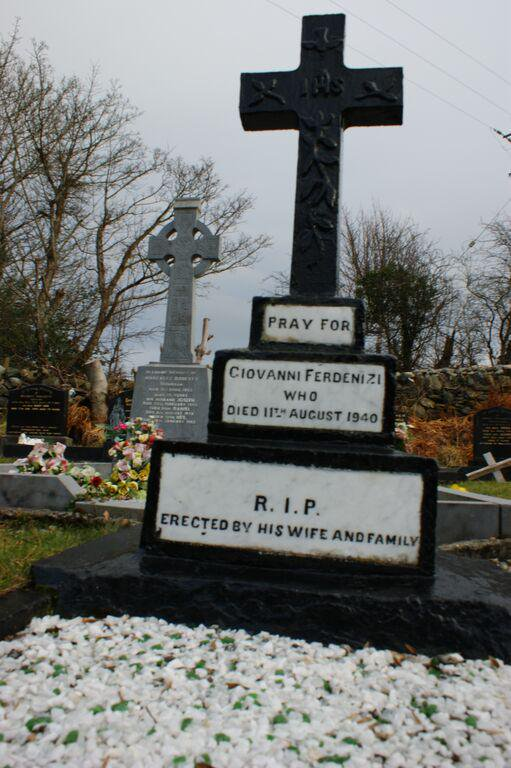
Grave of a Arandora Star victim who was washed up in County Donegal

At 9:30, an RAF Coastal Command Short Sunderland flying boat flew over and dropped watertight bags containing first aid kits, food, cigarettes, and a message that help was coming. The aircraft circled until 13:00, when the Canadian C-class destroyer HMCS St. Laurent arrived and rescued 868 survivors, of whom 586 were detainees. The injured were taken to Mearnskirk Hospital in Newton Mearns, Glasgow. One of the survivors was the athletics coach Franz Stampfl.

On 3 July, the UK War Cabinet received a report on the disaster. Its impact was overshadowed by the Royal Navy attack on Mers-el-Kébir, French Algeria, that sank elements of the French battle fleet. Throughout July and August, bodies were washed up on the Irish shore. On 30 July, the first body was found; 61-year-old Ernesto Moruzzi, who was found at Cloughglass, Burtonport. Four others were found on the same day. During August 1940, 213 bodies washed up on the Irish coast, of which 35 were from Arandora Star and a further 92 unidentified, potentially from the ship.

=== Citations ===
Captain Moulton was posthumously awarded Lloyd's War Medal for Bravery at Sea. Captain Burfeind was posthumously cited for his heroism in the evacuation, and the Canadian commander Harry DeWolf was cited for his heroism in the rescue.

== Wreck and remains ==
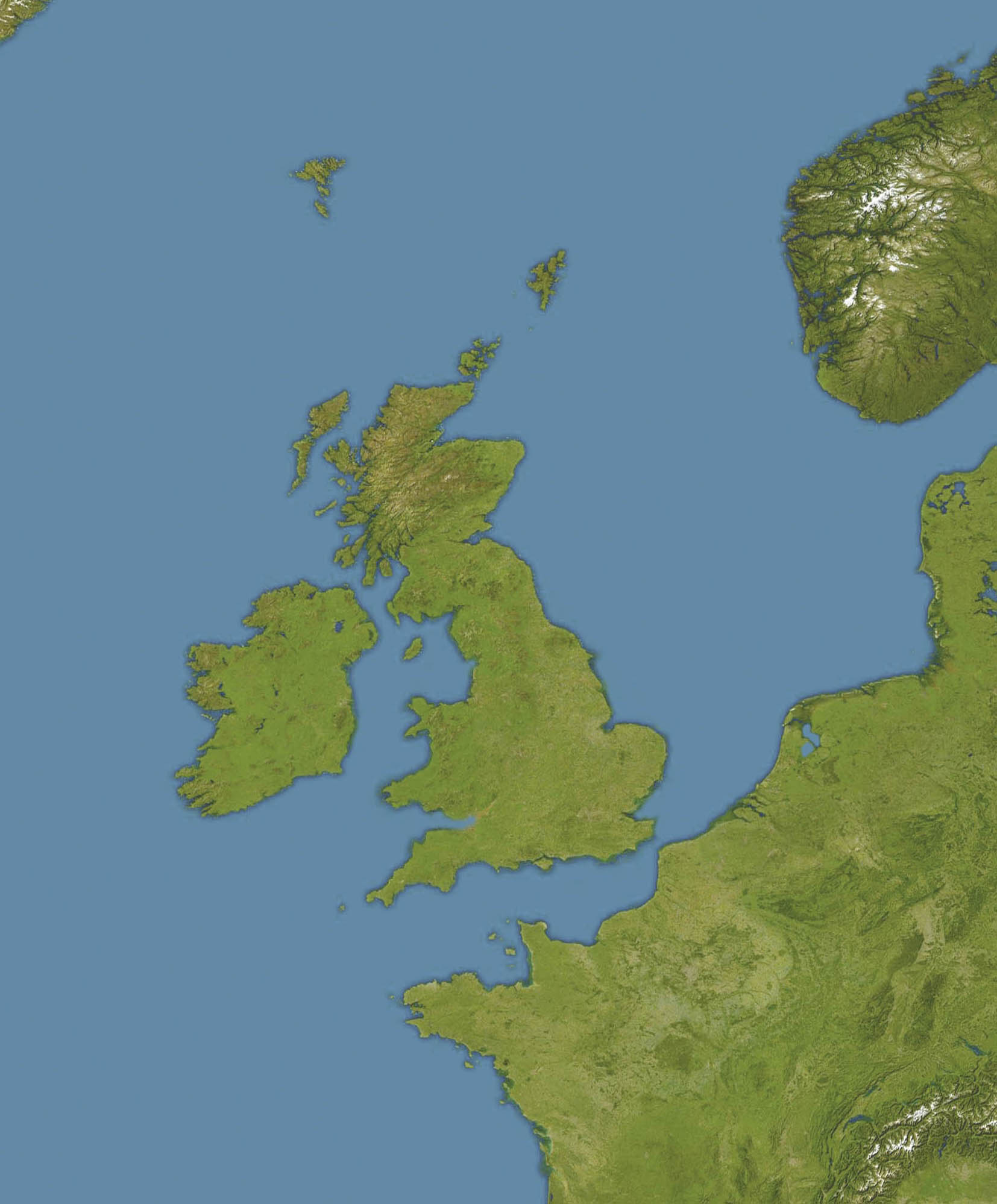
Approximate position of Arandora Star's wreck

The wreck's position is 56°30′N 10°38′W.

In the weeks following the Arandora Star's sinking many bodies of those who died were carried by the sea to various points in Ireland and the Hebrides. In the small graveyard of Termoncarragh, Belmullet, County Mayo, Luigi Tapparo, an internee from Edinburgh, and John Connelly, a Lovat Scout, lie buried side by side. Belmullet gardaí received a call from Annagh Head that another body had been found. From a service book on the body, Garda Sergeant Burns identified 27-year-old Frank Carter from Kilburn, London, a trooper in the Royal Dragoons. The body of Cesare Camozzi (1891–1940) from Iseo, Italy was washed ashore on the Inishowen peninsula, County Donegal and is buried at Sacred Heart graveyard, Carndonagh. 46 German civilian detainees, who were being shipped from England to Canada for internment when the ship sank, are buried in the German war cemetery in Glencree, County Wicklow. One of them was Karl Olbrysch a former KPD member of the Reichstag. The body of EG Lane from Kingsteignton, Newton Abbot, Devon, England, a private in the Devonshire Regiment, was washed onto the beach near Ballycastle, County Mayo and is buried in the local cemetery. His grave was re-dedicated in 2009 by the Mayo Peace Park Committee.

An unidentified sailor, unrecognisable other than for a tattoo bearing the name "Chrissie", was washed ashore near Newhouse, on the Atlantic coast of Kintyre, Argyll and, after official investigation, buried at the local churchyard of Killean, Kintyre, Argyll.

The wreck of one of the lifeboats remains visible at Knockvologan beach on the Ross of Mull, largely buried but with its iron suspension hooks still above the sand. Photographs of the lifeboat remains in 1969, as well as an eyewitness account by a Ms. Bella MacLennanin can be found in the citation. A 2006 picture shows the build up of sand over time.

== Memorials ==
A memorial chapel was built in a cemetery in Bardi, home town of 48 of the dead, and an annual commemorative mass is held in the town. A street in Bardi was renamed Via Arandora Star.

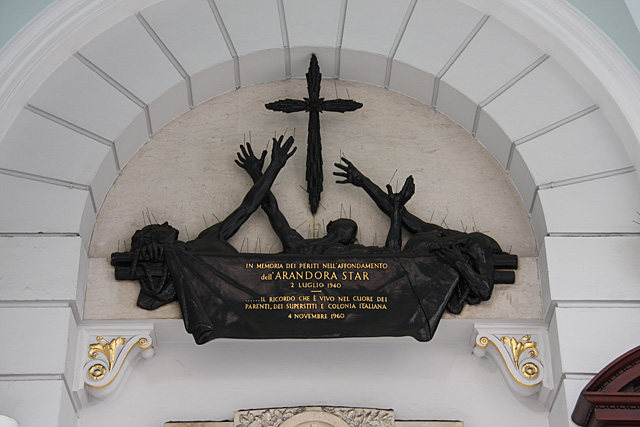
Memorial to the dead of the Arandora Star at St Peter's Italian Church, London, unveiled in 1960

St Peter's Italian Church in Clerkenwell, London, unveiled a wall memorial in 1960, and added a second memorial to London victims in 2012.

In 2004 the Italian town of Lucca unveiled a monument to 31 local men lost in the sinking, located in the courtyard of the museum of the Paolo Cresci Foundation for the History of Italian Emigration.. There is also a Via Arandora Star in Parma.

Numerous bodies were found on the Scottish island of Colonsay. A memorial was unveiled on Colonsay on 2 July 2005, the 65th anniversary of the tragedy, at the cliff where the body of Giuseppe Delgrosso was found.

A bronze memorial plaque was unveiled on 2 July 2008 at the Church of Our Lady and St Nicholas, Liverpool. It was relocated to the Pier Head in front of the old Mersey Docks and Harbour Board building after building work was finished.

In 2009, the 69th anniversary of the sinking, the Mayor of Middlesbrough unveiled a memorial in the town hall commemorating the town's 13 interned Italians held in cells there prior to deportation and death on the Arandora Star's final voyage.

On 2 July 2010, the 70th anniversary of the sinking, a new memorial was unveiled in St David's Roman Catholic Metropolitan Cathedral, Cardiff by the Arandora Star Memorial Fund in Wales.

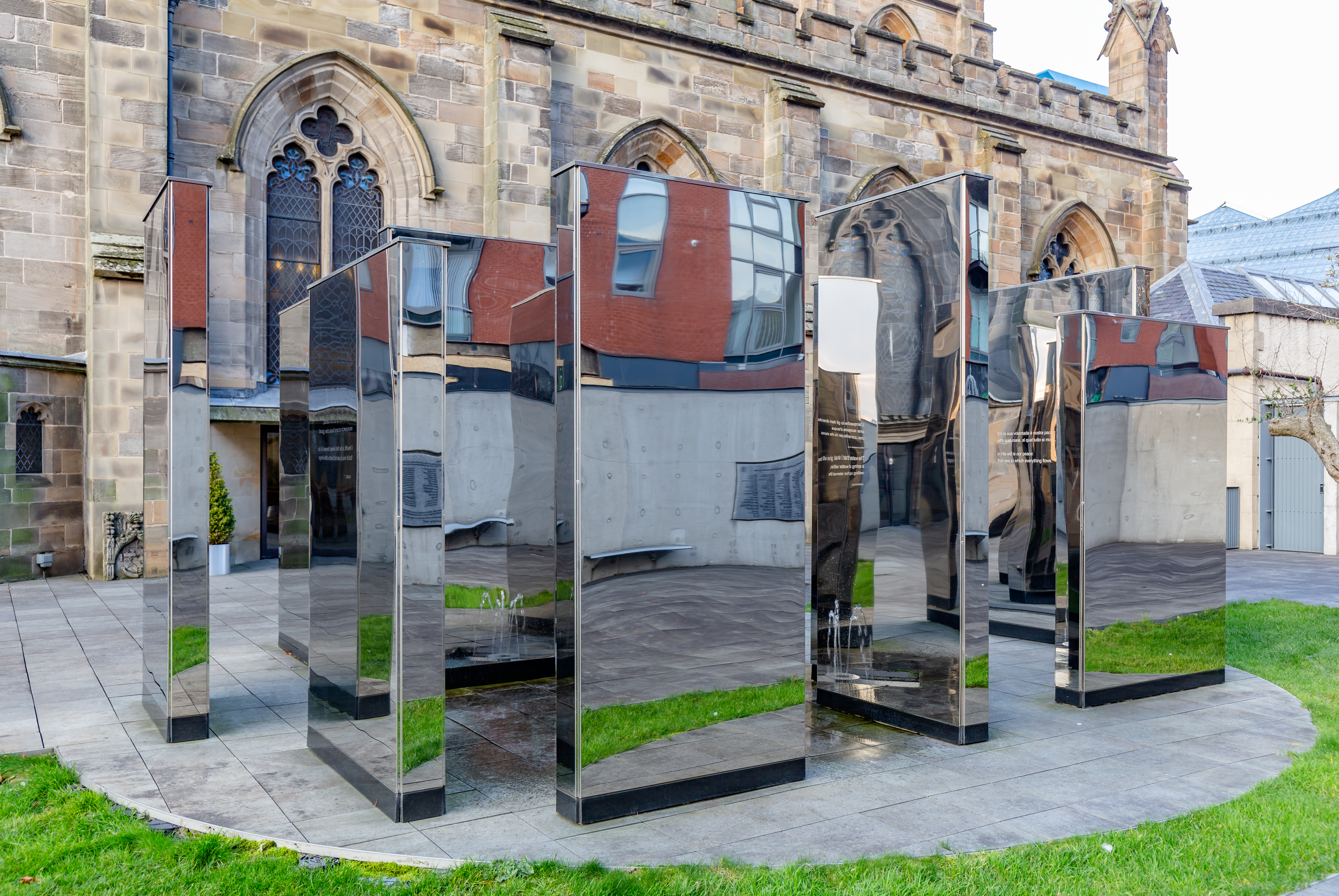
Italian Cloister Garden Memorial by St Andrew's Cathedral, Glasgow

On the same day, 2 July 2010, a memorial cloister garden was opened next to St Andrew's Roman Catholic Cathedral, Glasgow. Archbishop Mario Conti said at the time he hoped the monument would be a "fitting symbol" of the friendship between Scotland and Italy.

In 2019, a 3.5 metres (11 ft) ship model of the Arandora Star went on display at the Merseyside Maritime Museum after 400 hours of restoration work. It had originally been made for Blue Star for advertising use and was acquired by the former Liverpool Museum (now the World Museum) in 1940 shortly after the sinking, where it drew large crowds. However, on 3 May 1941 during the Liverpool Blitz, the adjacent Liverpool Central Library was bombed; the resulting fire spread to the museum and the model was water-damaged by fire hoses and was put into storage.

On 2 July 2021, the president of the National Association Carabinieri of Dublin, Ireland Francesco Morelli concurrently with the 80th anniversary of the Arandora Star, deposited and launched the memorial of the 446 Italian victims that were lost in the tragedy. The event took place in the Termoncarragh Belmullet cemetery, Co.Mayo. After having conducted various researches on the Arandorra Star and the Irish territory, the president Francesco Morelli chose this cemetery. Here two bodies have been buried with the following names: Giovanni Marenghi and Luigi Tapparo. During the same period, about thirty more non-identified bodies of Italian nationality have been buried in this cemetery. On the occasion of the memorial, Irish president, Michael D. Higgins, has remembered the 446 Italian victims together with another 356 victims of German and English nationality by sending a letter to the president of the National Association Carabinieri of Dublin, Ireland Francesco Morelli.

On 2 July 2022, the president of the national association Carabinieri of Dublin, Ireland Francesco Morelli concurrently with the Arandora Star's 82nd anniversary, has launched a memorial in Termoncarragh's cemetery (Bellmullet, Co. Mayo) for the five victims from Casalattico which have been lost in the tragedy. These were Giuseppe Forte, Antonio Fusco, Filippo Marsella, Giuseppe di Vito and Antonio Marsella. Irish military veterans and Carabinieri on leave have deposited tricolors flower crowns in memory of the 446 Italians which have died along the Irish coast. Parson Reverend Kevin Hegarty has celebrated the mass for the memorial. The event ended with a speech made by Co. Mayo's councilor Sean Carey.

== See also ==
- List by death toll of ships sunk by submarines
- Almeda Star − one of Arandora Star's sister ships, torpedoed and sunk with all 360 onboard lost in January 1941
- Avila Star − another of Arandora Star's sister ships, torpedoed and sunk in July 1942 with the loss of 84 lives
- RMS Nova Scotia − a UK liner sunk in November 1942 while carrying interned Italian civilians and prisoners of war with the loss of 858 of the 1,052 people aboard
- Enemy alien
- List of Japanese hell ships - Japanese ships used for carrying Allied prisoners of war and interned civilians. Many of the vessels were sunk, resulting in the death of over 20,000 POWs.

== Sources and further reading ==
- Balestracci, Maria Serena (2008). Arandora Star: from Oblivion to Memory. Parma: Mup Publishers. The book, with both English and Italian texts, includes rare and previously unpublished material, such as pictures related to the rescue of the Arandora Star taken in 1940 by St. Laurent's crew.
- Dorling, Henry Taprell (1973). Blue Star Line at War, 1939–45. London: W. Foulsham & Co. pp. 9, 40–45. ISBN 0-572-00849-X.
- Gardner, N. (4 September 2005). "Tragic Waters: The Sinking of the Arandora Star". Hidden Europe. pp. 34–36.
- Gillman, Peter; Gillman, Leni (1980). Collar the Lot! How Britain Interned & Expelled its Wartime Refugees. Quartet Books. ISBN 0704334089. This book gives the wider context of the sinking, includes first-hand accounts from a number of Italian, German and British survivors, and provided the first full history of the sinking to be published after the Second World War.
- Miller, William H Jr. Pictorial Encyclopedia of Ocean Liners, 1860–1994. Dover Maritime Books.
- Mitchell, W.H.; Sawyer, S.A. (1967). Cruising Ships. Merchant Ships of the World. Garden City, NY: Doubleday. ISBN 0356015041.
- Mummery, Brian; Butler, Ian (1999). Immingham and the Great Central Legacy (Images of England). Stroud: Tempus. ISBN 0-7524-1714-2.
