= SS Inchearn =

Ship built in 1943

History
- Name: Empire Flag (1943–46); Carmia (1946–54); Victoria Star (1954–55); Inchearn (1955–66)
- Owner: Ministry of War Transport (1943–45); Ministry of Transport (1945–46); Donaldson Atlantic Line Ltd (1946–54); Blue Star Line Ltd (1954–55); Williamson & Co Ltd (1955–66)
- Operator: New Zealand Shipping Co Ltd (1943–46); Donaldson Atlantic Line Ltd (1946–54); Blue Star Line Ltd (1954–55); Williamson & Co Ltd (1955–66)
- Port of registry: Newcastle upon Tyne, United Kingdom (1943–46); (United Kingdom) Glasgow (1946–54); (United Kingdom) London (1954–55); Hong Kong (1955-59); Hong Kong (1959-66)
- Builder: Sir W G Armstrong-Whitworth & Co (Shipbuilders) Ltd
- Yard number: 4
- Launched: 2 June 1943
- Completed: 29 October 1943
- Out of service: 1966
- Identification: United Kingdom Official Number 169169 (1943-55); Code Letters BFGQ (1943–55)
- Fate: Scrapped

General characteristics
- Class & type: Refrigerated cargo ship
- Tonnage: 7,024 GRT; 4,784 NRT; 10,300 DWT
- Length: 430 feet 9 inches (131.29 m)
- Beam: 56 ft 2 in (17.12 m)
- Draught: 26 ft 9 in (8.15 m)
- Depth: 35 ft 2 in (10.72 m)
- Installed power: 542 nhp
- Propulsion: Triple expansion steam engine, single screw propeller
- Speed: 11 knots (20 km/h)
- Armament: Anti-torpedo nets (Empire Flag)

Inchearn was a 7,024 GRT refrigerated cargo ship that was built as Empire Flag in 1943 by Sir W G Armstrong, Whitworth & Co (Shipbuilders) Ltd, Newcastle upon Tyne, United Kingdom for the Ministry of War Transport (MoWT). She was sold in 1946 and renamed Carmia. A further sale in 1954 saw her renamed Victoria Star. In 1955, she was sold to Hong Kong and renamed Inchearn. She served until 1966 when she was scrapped.

== Description ==
The ship was a refrigerated cargo ship built in 1943 by Sir W G Armstrong, Whitworth & Co (Shipbuilders) Ltd, Newcastle upon Tyne, United Kingdom. She was yard number 4.

The ship was 430 feet 9 inches (131.29 m) long, with a beam of 56 feet 2 inches (17.12 m). She had a depth of 35 feet 2 inches (10.72 m) and a draught of 26 feet 9 inches (8.15 m). She was assessed at 7,024 GRT, 4,784 NRT, 10,300 DWT.

The ship was propelled by a 542 nhp triple expansion steam engine, which had cylinders of 23½ inches (60 cm), 39 inches (99 cm) and 70 inches (180 cm) diameter by 48 inches (120 cm) stroke. The engine was built by the North East Marine Engineering Co (1938) Ltd. It drove a single screw propeller. The engine could propel the ship at a speed of 11 knots (20 km/h).

The ship's refrigeration comprised two refrigeration machines and eight compressors by L Stearns & Co Ltd. Insulation was by air, slag wool and slag cork. Her eight cargo chambers had a capacity of 287,000 cubic feet (8,100 m^{3}).

== History ==
The ship was built by Sir W G Armstrong, Whitworth & Co (Shipbuilders) Ltd, Newcastle upon Tyne in 1943 for the MoWT. She was launched on 2 June 1943 and completed on 29 October. The Code Letters BFGQ and United Kingdom Official Number were allocated. Her port of registry was Newcastle upon Tyne. She was placed under the management of the New Zealand Shipping Co Ltd.

Empire Flag departed from the Tyne on 7 November 1943 to join Convoy FN 1171, which had departed from Southend, Essex the previous day and arrived at Methil, Fife on 8 November. She then joined Convoy EN 305, which departed from Methil on 10 November and arrived at Loch Ewe on 13 November. Empire Flag put into Kirkwall, Orkney Islands on 12 November. She departed on 15 November and arrived at Loch Ewe the next day. She then joined Convoy ON 212, which departed from Liverpool, Lancashire on 19 November and arrived at New York, United States on 5 December. She put into Halifax, Nova Scotia, Canada on 2 December, sailing three days later with Convoy XB 86A, which arrived at the Cape Cod Canal on 7 December. Empire Flag arrived at New York the next day.

Empire Flag departed from New York on 29 December with Convoy HX 273, which arrived at Liverpool on 14 January 1944. She left the convoy at Loch Ewe on 13 January. Southend was reached on 18 January via Convoy WN 531 and Convoy FS 1333. Empire Flag departed from Southend on 18 February with Convoy FN 1271, which arrived at Methil on 20 February. She left the convoy at the Tyne on 19 February, sailing on 23 February to join Convoy FN 1275, which had departed from Southend the previous day and arrived at Methil on 24 February. She then joined Convoy EN 350, which departed that day and arrived at Loch Ewe on 26 February. She arrived at Oban, Argyllshire that day. Empire Flag sailed on 28 February to join Convoy ONS 30, which had departed from Liverpool the previous day and arrived at Halifax on 13 March. She then joined Convoy XB 100, which departed that day and arrived at Boston, Massachusetts, United States on 15 March. She left the convoy at the Cape Cod Canal and arrived at New York on 16 March. Empire Flag was a member of Convoy HX 286, which departed from New York on 5 April and arrived at Liverpool on 20 April. She was recorded as being fitted with anti-torpedo nets. She left the convoy at Loch Ewe. Southend was reached on 25 April via Convoy WN 573 and Convoy FS 1431.

Empire Flag departed from Southend on 10 May with Convoy FN 1353, which arrived at Methil on 12 May. She left the convoy at the Tyne on 11 May, sailing on 13 May to joi8n Convoy FN 1355, which had departed from Southend the previous day and arrived at Methil on 14 May. She then joined Convoy EN 384, which sailed on 16 May and arrived at Loch Ewe two days later. Empire Flag then joined Convoy ON 237, which had departed from Liverpool on 19 May and arrived at New York on 3 June. She sailed from New York on 24 June with convoy HX 297, which arrived at Liverpool on 11 July. Empire Flag left the convoy at Loch Ewe on 10 July, reaching Southend on 15 July via Convoy WN 606 and Convoy FS 1512.

Empire Flag departed from Southend on 29 July with Convoy FN 1433, which arrived at Methil on 31 July. She left the convoy at the Tyne on 30 July, sailing again on 3 August to join Convoy FN 1437, which had departed from Southend the previous day and arrived at Methil on 4 August. She then joined Convoy EN 417, which departed Methil that day and arrived at Loch Ewe on 6 August, from where she proceeded to Oban, arriving on 9 August. Empire Flag sailed on 11 August to join Convoy ON 248S, which had departed from Liverpool the previous day and arrived at New York on 27 August. She sailed from New York on 6 September as a member of Convoy HX 307, which arrived at Liverpool on 20 September. She sailed on to Cardiff, Glamorgan, arriving later that day.

Empire Flag sailed from Cardiff on 2 October for Milford Haven, Pembrokeshire, which she reached the next day. She sailed on 16 October to join Convoy OS 92KM, which had departed from Liverpool the previous day and dispersed at sea on 25 October. She arrived at Buenos Aires, Argentina on 14 November. Empire Flag sailed on 27 November for Durban, South Africa, which was reached on 17 December. She sailed four days later for Mauritius, arriving on 29 December.

Empire Flag sailed from Mauritius on 31 December for Calcutta, India, where she arrived on 22 January 1945. She sailed on 11 February for Diego Suarez, Madagascar, arriving on 2 March and then sailing for Tamatave, which was also reached on 2 March. She then sailed to Majunga, from where she departed on 18 March for Tamatave. She sailed on 21 March and is next recorded as arriving at Majunga on 12 April. Empire Flag then sailed to Mombasa, Kenya, arriving on 23 April. She departed on 30 April for Suez, Egypt, arriving on 14 May. She then sailed to Port Said, from where she departed on 17 May for Marseille, Bouches-du-Rhône, France, which was reached on 28 May. Empire Flag sailed on 14 June for Casablanca, Morocco, which was reached on 18 June. She sailed the next day for Buenos Aires.

Empire Flag departed from Buenos Aires on 24 July for Montevideo, Uruguay, arriving the next day. She sailed two days later for the Cape Verde Islands, Portugal, arriving on 17 August and sailing the next day for Madeira, Portugal, which was reached on 26 August. She sailed later that day for Liverpool, arriving on 3 September. Empire Flag departed from Liverpool on 6 October for Glasgow, Renfrewshire, arriving the next day. She left the Clyde on 9 November for Halifax, arriving on 24 November and sailing three days later for New York, where she arrived on 30 November.

In 1946, Empire Flag was sold to Donaldson Atlantic Line Ltd, Glasgow and renamed Carmia. In 1954, she was sold to Blue Star Line Ltd, London and renamed Victoria Star. In 1955, she was sold to Williamson & Co Ltd, Hong Kong and renamed Inchearn. She served until 1966. Inchearn was scrapped at Osaka, Japan in August 1966.
