= Collar the Lot! =

1980 book by Peter Gillman and Leni Gillman

- Author: Peter Gillman and Leni Gillman
- Language: English
- Genre: Documentary
- Publisher: Quartet Books
- Publication date: 1980
- Media type: Print (book)
- Pages: 352
- ISBN: 0-7043-3408-9

Collar the Lot! How Britain Interned & Expelled its Wartime Refugees is a book by Peter Gillman and Leni Gillman. It is a detailed account of British internment policy during the Second World War.

At first, the British government took a relaxed attitude to the tens of thousands of "enemy aliens", most of them refugees who had found sanctuary in Britain from the Nazis. But a panic following the fall of France and the invasion scare in May/June 1940 led to a mass round-up of most Germans in Britain, regardless of their political allegiances. When Italy joined the war thousands of Italians were rounded up too, also irrespective of their political allegiances or how long they had lived in Britain. It was at this time that Winston Churchill, so the cabinet minutes record, issued the order: "Collar the Lot!"

MI5 was supposed to be making sensible assessments but in fact contributed to the panic and misjudgment. The authors show that both the Home Office and the Foreign Office took a more liberal line, and would have preferred to allow most of the refugees to remain free.

The book also records the incident of the Arandora Star, in which 1,500 internees were being transported to Canada. It was sunk by a German U-boat and two-thirds of those on board were drowned. The authors interviewed survivors in Britain, the US, and Australia. Many of them were deported again on a second liner, the Dunera; this time heading for Australia. During the voyage the Dunera narrowly survived another U-boat attack. There were two more deportation voyages to Canada before the outcry in Britain over the Arandora Star led the British government to revise its policy. From that point on, the internees were gradually released from their holding camps in Britain, leaving only a handful of confirmed Nazis and Fascists.

The book won very favourable reviews when it was published, and became the standard reference source on that topic, until the issue was reopened twenty years later.

== See also ==
- Category:Internment camps in the Isle of Man
- Huyton internment camp
