= MV Nelson Star =

1943 cargo ship in United Kingdom

History
- Name: Empire Castle (1942–46); Gothic Star (1946–48); Nelson Star (1948–58); Patagonia Star (1958–61); Eirini (1961–70); Byzantium (1970–71)
- Owner: Ministry of War Transport (1942–45); Blue Star Line (1945–61); Gregory Maritime Ltd (1961–70); Angila Shipping Co Ltd (1970–71)
- Operator: Federal Steam Navigation Co Ltd (1942–44); Blue Star Line (1944–61); Theodorou & Sons Ltd (1961–70); Angila Shipping Co Ltd (1970–71)
- Port of registry: (United Kingdom) Belfast (1942–45); (United Kingdom) London (1945–70); Cyprus (1970–71)
- Builder: Harland & Wolff, Belfast
- Yard number: 1125
- Launched: 27 August 1942
- Completed: 31 January 1943
- Out of service: 29 September 1970
- Identification: Call sign BFDM (1942–46); UK official number 168520 (1942–70); IMO Number 5099032 (–1971)
- Fate: Scrapped 1971

General characteristics
- Tonnage: 7,365 GRT; tonnage under deck 6,771; 5,126 NRT
- Length: 431.4 feet (131.5 m)
- Beam: 57.3 feet (17.5 m)
- Draught: 37 feet 8 inches (11.48 m)
- Depth: 33.6 feet (10.2 m)
- Installed power: 489 NHP
- Propulsion: 6-cylinder marine Diesel engine
- Sensors & processing systems: wireless direction finding; echo sounding device
- Armament: DEMS (1942–45)
- Notes: sister ship: Saxon Star

Nelson Star was a 7,365 GRT refrigerated cargo liner that was built in 1942 for the Ministry of War Transport (MoWT). In 1946 she was sold to Blue Star Line and renamed Gothic Star. She was renamed Nelson Star in 1948 and Patagonia Star in 1958. In 1961, she was sold and renamed Eirini. In 1970, she was sold to Cypriot owners and renamed Byzantium. After engine damage and a fire while laid up, she was scrapped in 1971.

== Description ==
The ship was built in Belfast by Harland & Wolff Ltd as yard number 1125. She was a refrigerated cargo liner. She was launched on 25 August 1942 and completed in January 1943.

The ship was 431.4 feet (131.5 m) long, with a beam of 57.3 feet (17.5 m) and a depth of 33.6 feet (10.2 m). She had a GRT of 7,365 and a NRT of 5,135.

She was propelled by a four-stroke single-acting marine Diesel engine, which had six cylinders 29 1/8 inches (74 cm) diameter by 50 1/16 inches (127.2 cm) stroke. The engine was built by Harland and Wolff but was a Burmeister & Wain design from Denmark.

== History ==
Empire Castle was built for the MoWT, who appointed Federal Steam Navigation Co Ltd to manage her. She was allocated the UK official number 168520. The Call sign BFDM were allocated and her port of registry was Belfast.

Empire Castle was a member of a number of convoys in the Second World War.

UC 1

Convoy UC 1 left Liverpool on 15 February 1943 bound for New York. Empire Castle was in ballast.

ON 189

Convoy ON 189 left Loch Ewe on 16 June 1943 bound for the USA. Empire Castle was a member of this convoy.

In 1944 management of Empire Castle was transferred to Blue Star Line. She was sold to the Blue Star Line on 30 May 1945 and renamed Gothic Star, the second Blue Star Line ship to bear that name. She was renamed Nelson Star in 1947, and Patagonia Star in 1958, the second Blue Star Line ship to carry that name.

In May 1961 Patagonia Star was sold to Gregory Maritime Ltd, London and renamed Eirini. With the introduction of IMO Numbers, she was allocated number 5099032. Eirini served with Gregory's for nine years. She was sold in 1970 to Angila Shipping Co Ltd, Cyprus and renamed Byzantium. On 29 September 1970, she put into Gibraltar with damaged machinery and was laid up. On 6 February 1971, she caught fire. The accommodation and bridge deck were gutted. She was then taken to Málaga, Spain. On 31 July 1971, Byzantium sailed for Puerto Santa Maria, where scrapping by Desguaces y Recuperaciones del Sur SL began on 17 August.
