= Blue Star Line =

Shipping company

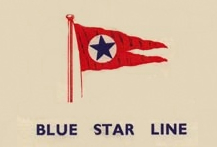
- Industry: water transport
- Founded: 1911, refounding: 2012
- Founder: Vestey Brothers
- Fate: Sold to P&O Nedlloyd in 1998
- Headquarters: London, United Kingdom
- Area served: Worldwide
- Services: Container transportation, Passenger transportation
- Net income: US $ 159.3 million in 2013
- Subsidiaries: Lamport & Holt Line, Booth Line, Associated container transportation, Starman shipping, Austasia line

The Blue Star Line was a British passenger and cargo shipping company formed in 1911, being in operation until 1998.

== Formation ==
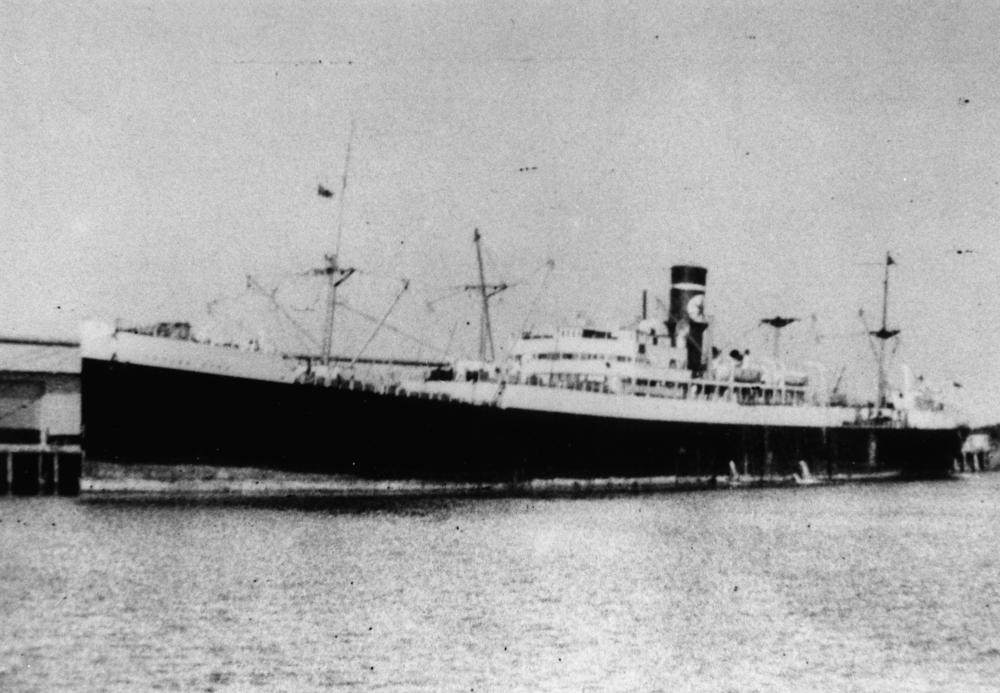
Trojan Star, built in France in 1916 and bought by a Blue Star-controlled company in 1924

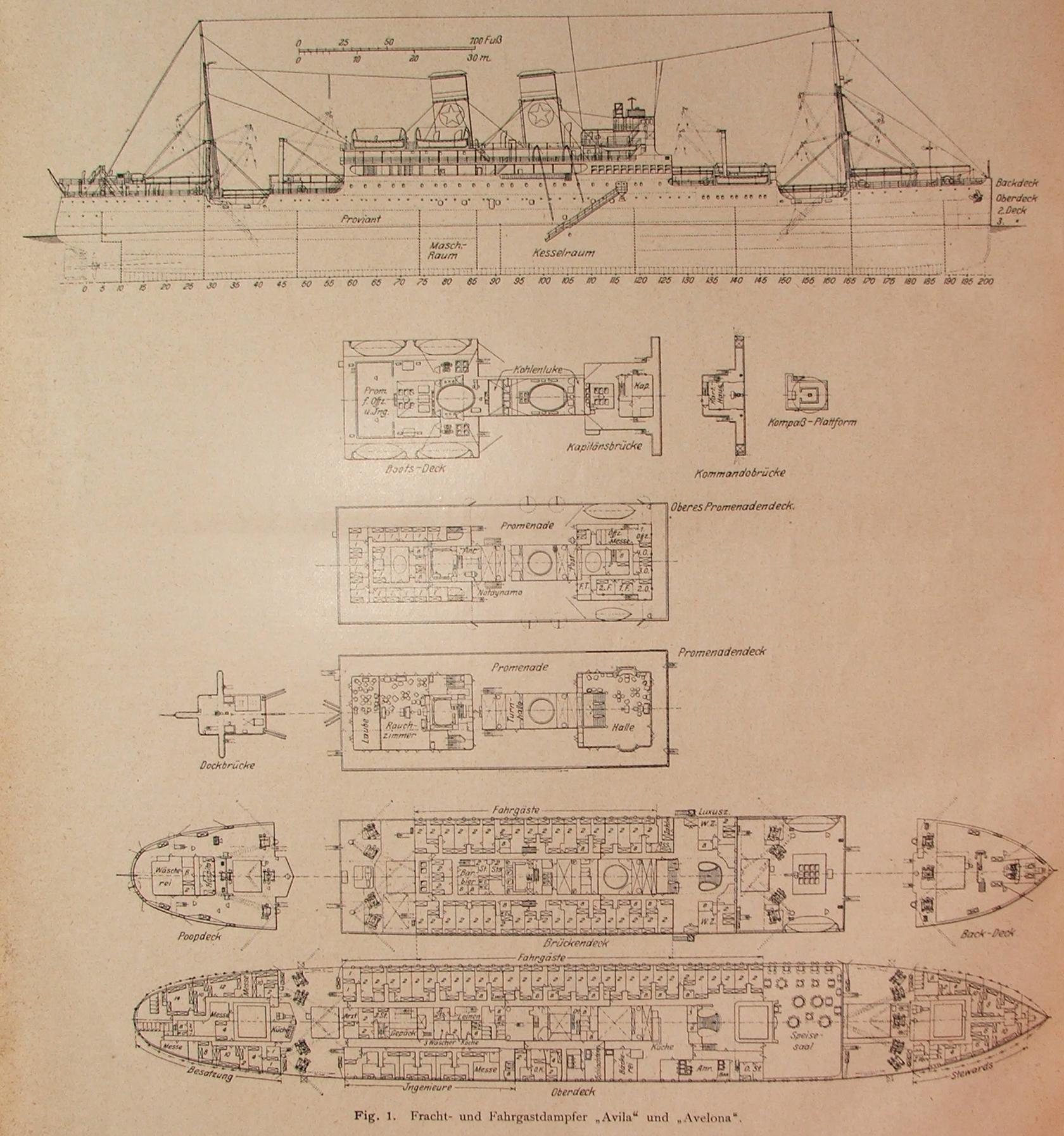
Plans for the liners Avila and Avelona, built in 1926–27

Blue Star Line was formed as an initiative by the Vestey Brothers, a Liverpool-based butchers company, who had founded the Union Cold Storage Company to take advantage of refrigeration practices. They developed a large importation business, shipping frozen meat from South America to Britain, initially from Argentina on ships of the Royal Mail Steam Packet Company, and other shipping lines that called at South American ports. The high prices charged for transport by these companies led the Vestey brothers to start to operate their own ships. They chartered their first ships from 1904, and began to buy their own ships from 1909 onwards. The Blue Star Line was officially inaugurated on 28 July 1911, initially using second-hand ships. They ordered their first new ship in 1914, and by the outbreak of the First World War were operating twelve refrigerated cargo ships. These were initially prefixed 'Brod', e.g. Brodfield, Brodholme and Brodland. Ships of the company were identifiable by their red funnels with black tops and narrow white and black bands, with a white circle with blue five-pointed star on the red background. Their hull colours were either black or black with a white band, and red boot-topping.

The company supplied beef to allied forces in France during the war, and began an expansion programme after it was over. The name format was altered with the introduction of the "Star" suffix to ship names, starting with Royalstar launched in 1919, later renamed Royal Star. The company expanded its operations to include services to the Pacific coast of North America from 1920, and Australia and New Zealand from 1933. The Blue Star Line acquired Frederick Leyland and Company in 1935 and operated it as a subsidiary.

Blue Star expanded into passenger transport, notably with five 12,900 GRT liners built in 1926–27 for its new London – Rio de Janeiro – Buenos Aires route. Cammell Laird of Birkenhead built three sister ships: Almeda, Andalucia and Arandora. John Brown & Company of Clydebank built two: Avelona and Avila. The quintet came to be called the "Luxury Five". The five ships also had refrigerated holds to carry frozen meat from South America to Britain.

The new service was a challenge to both foreign competitors and the Royal Mail Steam Packet Company, whose Royal Mail Ships had been the premier UK carrier of mail, passengers and some cargoes between Britain, Brazil and the River Plate for 75 years. RMSP Chairman Lord Kylsant called the Blue Star ships "very keen competition" even though at the very same time his company introduced two larger and more luxurious new ocean liners for passenger and refrigerated cargo on the route, the 22,200 GRT Asturias (completed 1926) and Alcantara (completed 1927).

In 1929 Blue Star added "Star" to the end of the name of each of its ships. This may have been partly to help distinguish Blue Star from Royal Mail Steam Packet Company, whose ships bore similar Spanish names. RMSP was an old company with a distinguished history, but had got into difficulties and collapsed amid financial scandal in 1932.

In 1935 Harland and Wolff in Belfast launched Imperial Star, the first of a new class of refrigerated cargo motor ships designed to carry frozen meat on Blue Star's regular route from Australia and New Zealand to the UK. By the end of 1939 Harland and Wolff had completed six Imperial Star-class ships and Cammell Laird in Birkenhead had completed three.

== Second World War ==
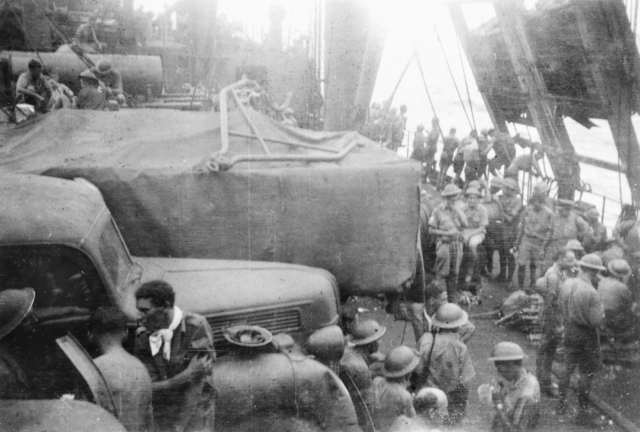
Troops and RAF equipment crowded aboard Empire Star in the evacuation of Singapore, 12 February 1942

By 1939 Blue Star Line operated 39 ships, all of which gave Second World War service. In 1940 an Imperial Star-class ship being built by Burmeister & Wain in Denmark was captured in the German invasion of Denmark and completed as a Kriegsmarine submarine tender.

Because the Imperial Star-class were refrigerated and in merchant shipping terms relatively fast, several sailed in high-risk convoys to relieve the siege of Malta. Melbourne Star and Sydney Star took part in Operation Substance in July 1941, Imperial Star and Dunedin Star were in Operation Halberd the following month, and in August 1942 Melbourne Star and Brisbane Star served in Operation Pedestal. In February 1942 another ship of the same class, Empire Star, successfully evacuated an estimated 2,160 people from the fall of Singapore.

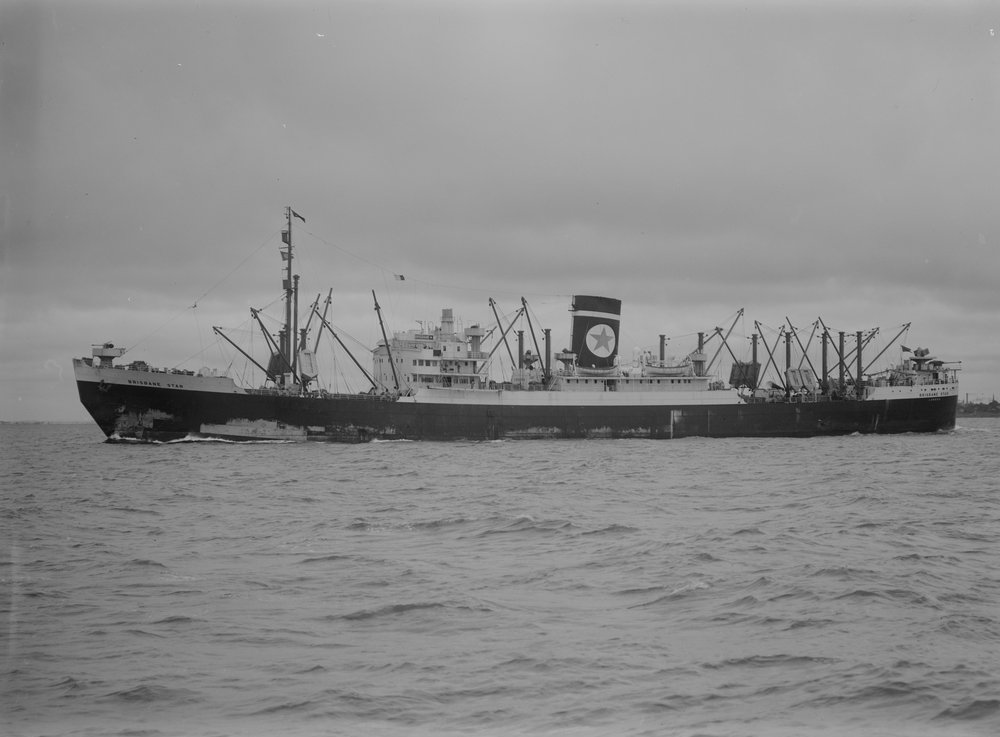
Brisbane Star after her bow was rebuilt in 1943. She had been damaged by a torpedo during Operation Pedestal to relieve the siege of Malta in 1942.

Blue Star suffered heavy losses. 29 ships were sunk: a total of 309,390 gross register tons (GRT). They included all of the Luxury Five liners, and two Empire ships that the company was managing for the Ministry of War Transport. Another 16 vessels, including three more Empire ships under Blue Star management, were seriously damaged. By the end of hostilities only 12 "Star" ships remained in the fleet. 646 Blue Star personnel, 272 passengers and 78 DEMS gunners were killed.

Blue Star Line bought Lamport and Holt Line in 1944 and Booth Steamship Company in 1946, and ships were often transferred back and forth between the subsidiary companies.

== Postwar ==
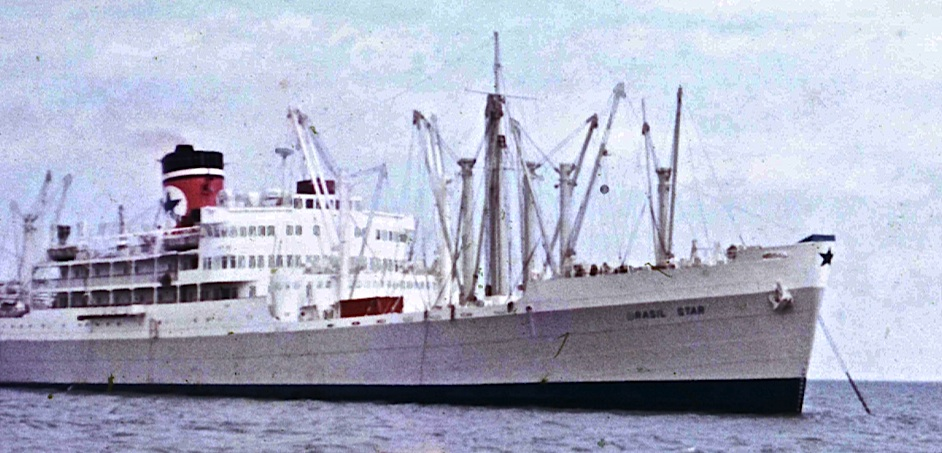
Brasil Star, launched in 1947, was one of the replacements for war losses

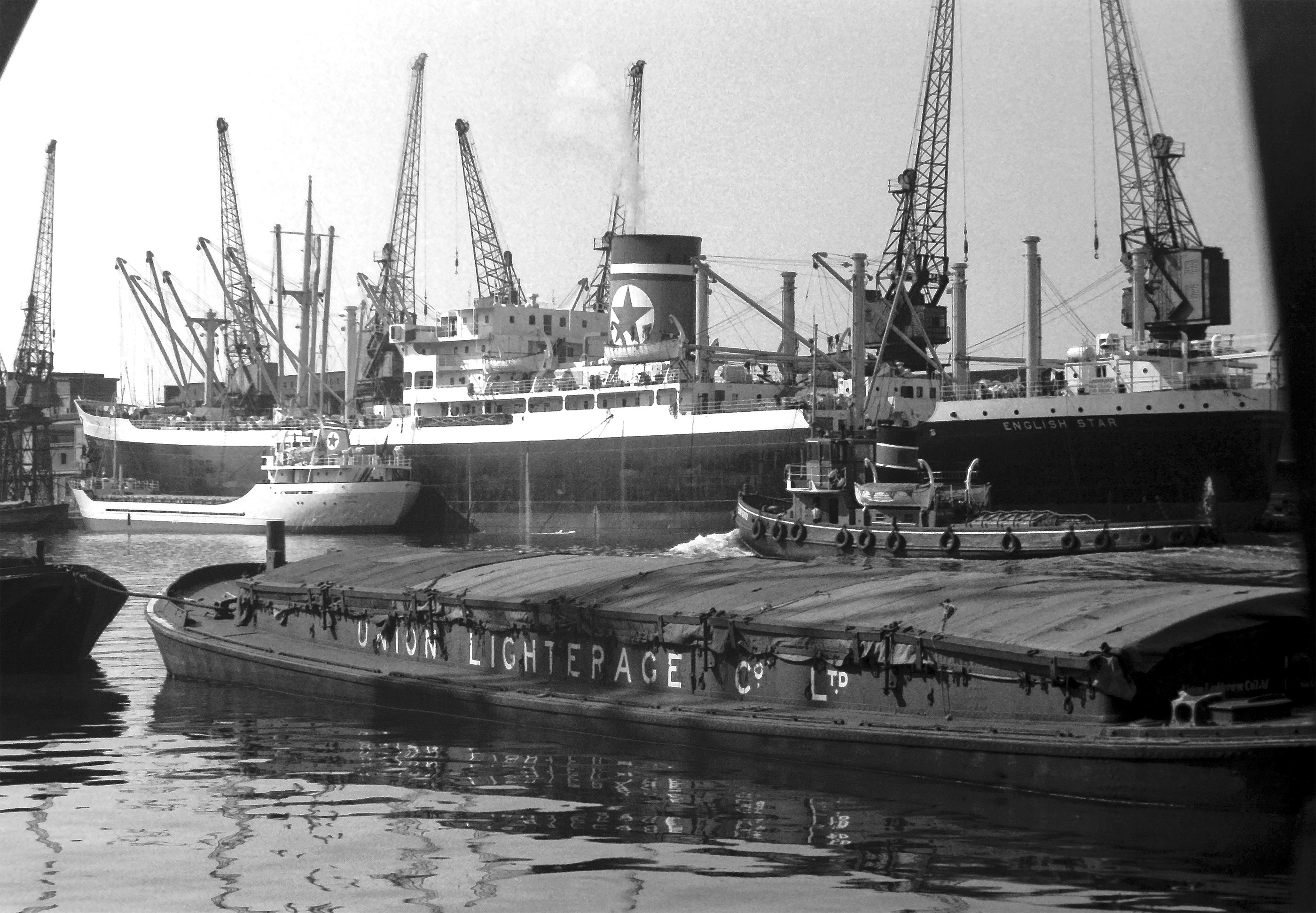
English Star together with company-owned coaster Crouch in London docks, 1967

Another building programme was enacted to replace wartime losses, supplemented by the purchase or hire of existing ships including Empire ships such as Empire Castle and Empire Strength from the Ministry of War Transport. In 1952 Austasia Line was formed to operate services between Singapore, Indonesia, Malaysia and Australia, while Blue Star Line took over the North American routes previously operated by Donaldson Line in 1954. In 1957 Blue Star Line joined with three other shipping companies, the New Zealand Shipping Company, Port Line and Shaw, Savill & Albion to form the Crusader Shipping Company, and in 1965 entered a partnership with Italian shippers to form Calmeda S.p.A. di Nav, Cagliari. Blue Star Line now had global interests, with ports of call on the Pacific North American coast, in Japan, New Zealand, Australia, Canada, South America and Italy. They were also one of the major shareholders, along with several other large shipping firms, in British United Airways.

== Reorganisation and decline ==
Blue Star Line divested itself of its holdings in British United Airways in 1968 and became one of the founding partners that year in Associated Container Transportation (ACT), along with the Ben Line, Cunard (Port Line), Harrison Line and Ellerman Lines. Blue Star Line gradually moved towards containerization, ending its passenger services to South America in 1972. Blue Star took over ACT's Pacific Australia Container Express (PACE) line which operated between the USA and Australia.

In 1982–83 Blue Star Line assisted in the defence of the Falkland Islands by managing the barracks ship TEV Rangatira at Port Stanley. Also managed MV Avelona Star at the time under requisition of MOD.

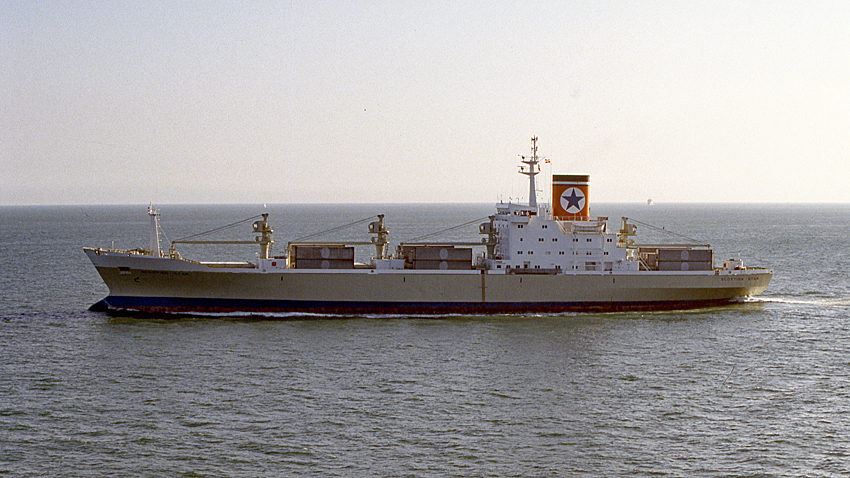
Scottish Star in the Solent, 1993

Blue Star Line was bought by P&O Nedlloyd in 1998, which acquired the name and most of the assets, with the exception of most of the reefer ships, which were kept by the Vestey Group under the name Albion Reefers, and then merged with Hamburg Süd's reefer fleet under the name Star Reefers. Star Reefers was sold in July 2001 to Norwegian interests, and then subsequently merged with NYK Group as NYK Star Reefers Ltd. The Blue Star Line ships bought by P&O Nedlloyd, which included those operated as part of ACT, continued in service with P&O Nedlloyd under Blue Star Line names and liveries. Some of the original Blue Star vessels sold to P&O Nedlloyd traded until February 2003 on the East Coast of America to Australia and New Zealand. They were the America Star (ex ACT 3), Melbourne Star (ex ACT 4), Sydney Star (ex ACT 5) and Queensland Star (ex ACT 6). The last vessel trading, to carry the Blue Star funnel colours was the America Star, which was handed over to be broken up on 19 February 2003.

== Reederei Blue Star ==
P&O Nedlloyd formed Reederei Blue Star in 2002 as a ship management company, from which it chartered ships. P&O Nedlloyd was bought by AP Moller Maersk Group in 2005 and merged into its operations to form Maersk Line. Reederei Blue Star continues to operate as part of Maersk Line.

On 18 June 2009 Komrowski took over the ship management company Reederei Blue Star GmbH, Hamburg, from Maersk Ship Management Holding B.V., Rotterdam. As of July 2012, the Komrowski Group-owned Blue Star merged with Komrowski Befrachtungskontor and E.R. Schiffahrt to form The Blue Star Holding.

The Titanic II, a replica ship proposal of the original Titanic that sank in 1912, is a Blue Star Line Cruises ship owned by Australian billionaire/businessman Clive Palmer who started the plan on April 14, 2012. This effort has no relation to the original and historic Blue Star Line.

== Sources ==
- "Taffrail" (Henry Taprell Dorling) (1973). Blue Star Line at War, 1939–45. London: W. Foulsham & Co. ISBN 0-572-00849-X.

== Links ==
- "Blue Star Line". The Ships List. Archived from the original on 10 March 2010.
- "Blue Star Gallery". iancoombe.
- Blue Star on the Web
- Documents and clippings about Blue Star Line in the 20th Century Press Archives of the ZBW
