= Nibiru (tourist resort) =

Resort in Romania

Coordinates: 43.9646°N 28.6434°E

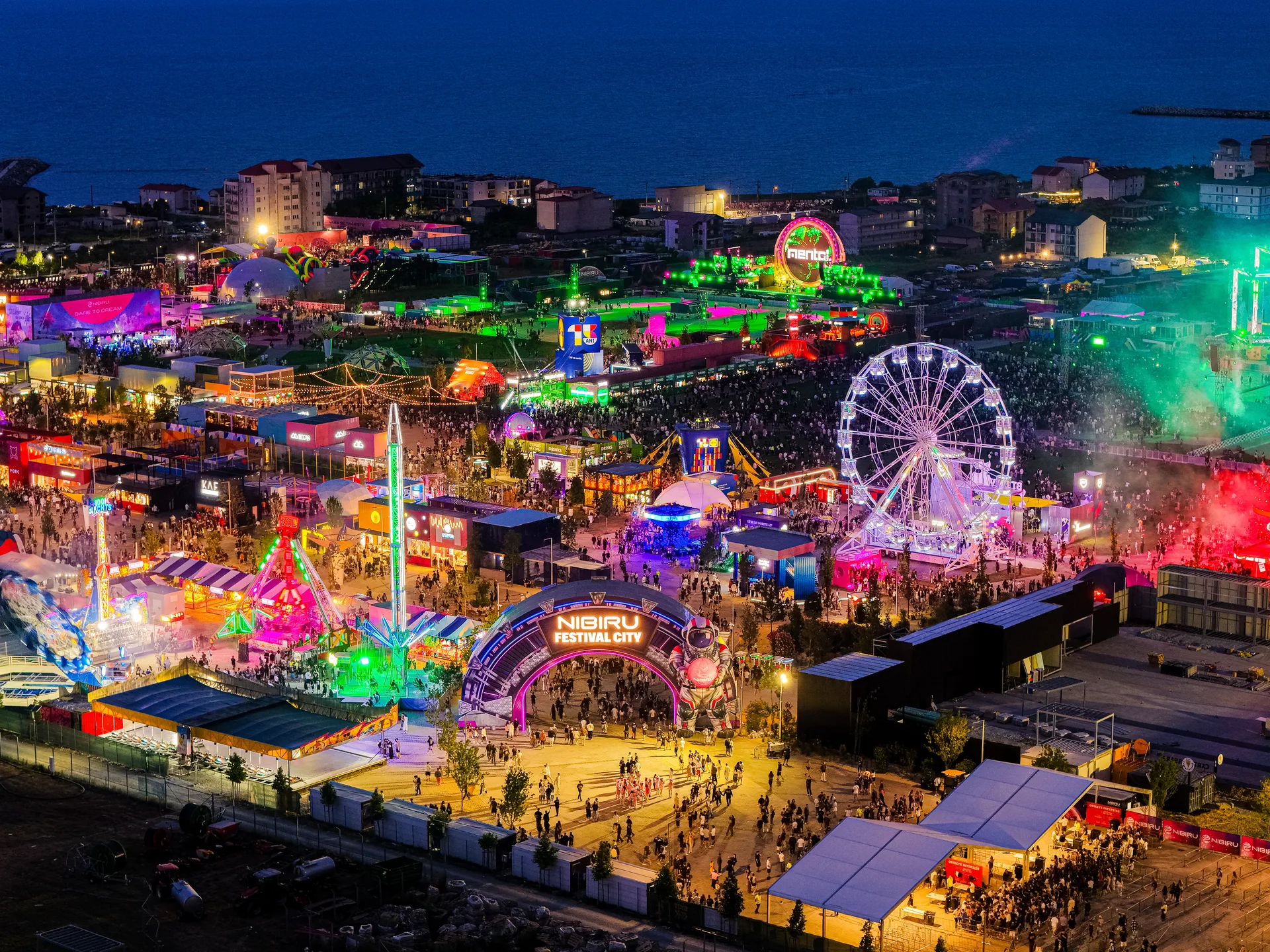
- Type: Seasonal entertainment resort
- Industry: Entertainment, tourism
- Founded: 2025
- Founder: Global Records, Andrei Șelaru
- Area served: Costinești – Tuzla, Constanța County, Romania
- Website: nibiru.net

NIBIRU is a seasonal entertainment resort located on the Romanian Black Sea coast, in the area between Costinești and Tuzla, Constanța County. The project was publicly announced in July 2025 and was opened on July 16, 2026, with an inaugural season of 46 days (Julu 16 - August 30, 2026). The declared investment for the first phase of development exceeds 50 million euros.

The resort brings together entertainment, gastronomy, retail, sport and live events in a single location, with a programme including thematic festivals, daily shows and family-oriented areas. According to the organizers, the first season comprises over 150 events and over 200 Romanian and international artists.

== History ==
The project was publicly announced on July 29, 2025, at an event held in Bucharest. The majority investor is Global Records Group, alongside Andrei Șelaru (known online as Selly) and a group of entrepreneurs from the HoReCa, real estate, and entertainment sectors.

Andrei Șelaru and Lucian Ștefan Gîtiță, founder and CEO of Global Records, previously co-founded the Beach, Please! festival, launched in 2022 at the same location in Costinești.

In March 2026, the management team announced the official opening date and the events calendar for the first season. In April 2026, at a live-streamed event, over 90 confirmed artists were presented and ticket sales for the entire season were opened.

== Investors and team ==
NIBIRU is developed by Andrei Șelaru (Selly), co-founder and CEO, alongside Global Records Group, an independent record label based in Romania, which is the majority investor.

The management team includes Răzvan Luca (Lead Architect), George Carabelea (General Producer) and Claudiu Ilioiu (Head of Partnerships, representative of Global Records Group). Construction is carried out by BRISK Group.

== Infrastructure and zones ==
According to the developers, the complex covers an area of approximately 210,000 square meters. The resort is designed as a seasonal destination, open daily during the summer, accessible directly from the DN39 national road, a short walk from Costinești train station.

The underground infrastructure includes approximately 17 kilometers of utility networks and a rainwater collection basin used for lawn irrigation. The construction system uses standardized modules of 18 square meters. According to co-founder Andrei Șelaru, the commercial model for retail spaces is based on fixed-term lease agreements, similar to a shopping mall.

The layout includes several distinct zones:

1. NIBIRU Promenade is the central area of the resort, featuring over 30 restaurants, cafés and shops, a main stage (NIBIRU Center Stage), children's play areas and sports facilities.
2. NIBIRU Arena is the main concert and festival venue, with a declared capacity of approximately 30,000 people.
3. NIBIRU Beer Garden is an open-air venue with approximately 1,000 seats, developed in partnership with URSUS Breweries, dedicated to live concerts and socializing.
4. The Fool Comedy Club is the stand-up comedy venue, with shows scheduled throughout the entire season.
5. Hype Play is the family and children's zone, covering approximately 5,000 square meters, including collaborations with MINA (Museum of Immersive New Art) and toy retailer Noriel.
6. Amusement Park and Planet Museum are two attractions integrated into the Promenade, combining leisure and informal education, including rides such as a Ferris wheel.
7. Fashion District is the retail area of the resort, dedicated to local and international fashion brands.

=== NIBIRU Center Stage ===
The resort's central promenade stage hosts daily shows combining concerts, dance, acrobatics and circus elements. According to the organizers, the shows are conceived exclusively for NIBIRU in collaboration with director Răzvan Dincă, with each production built around the artistic identity of the performer.

Among the artists announced for Center Stage are Smiley, Delia, INNA, Carla's Dreams, Theo Rose and Antonia.

== Events and programs ==
The first season's events calendar includes thematic festivals and recurring evenings. Among the announced festivals are:

- Galaxia Festival (July 17–19, 2026), focused on pop music, reggaeton and international pop. The lineup includes Nicky Jam, Ozuna, Hugel, INNA and others;
- Nebula X (July 23–26, 2026), dedicated to electronic music;
- K-Pop Days (August 1–2, 2026), an event dedicated to K-pop music;
- Rock Days (August 7–8, 2026), a Romanian rock festival;
- Porc Fest (August 22–23, 2026), a two-day festival dedicated to hip-hop culture and the underground community. Among the announced artists are Deliric x Silent Strike, Guess Who, Sami G, Blanco, Ștefan Costea x George Pitariu and Vlad Flueraru, El Nino, Maximilian and others;
- Retrograde Festival (August 28–30, 2026), focused on 2000s music, with a lineup including Timbaland, Fat Joe, Busta Rhymes and Ja Rule.

== Gallery ==
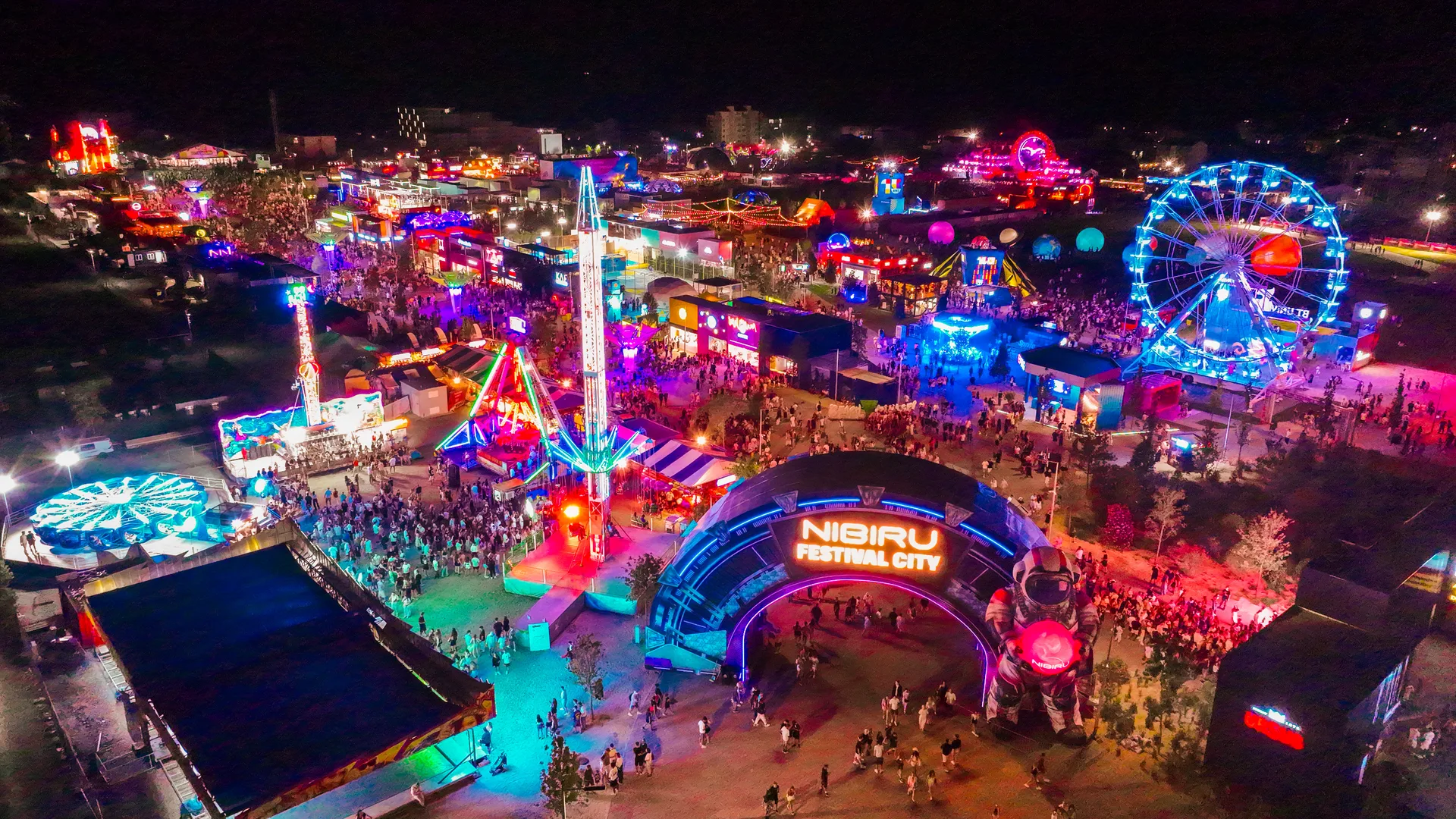
Nibiru entrance wide night

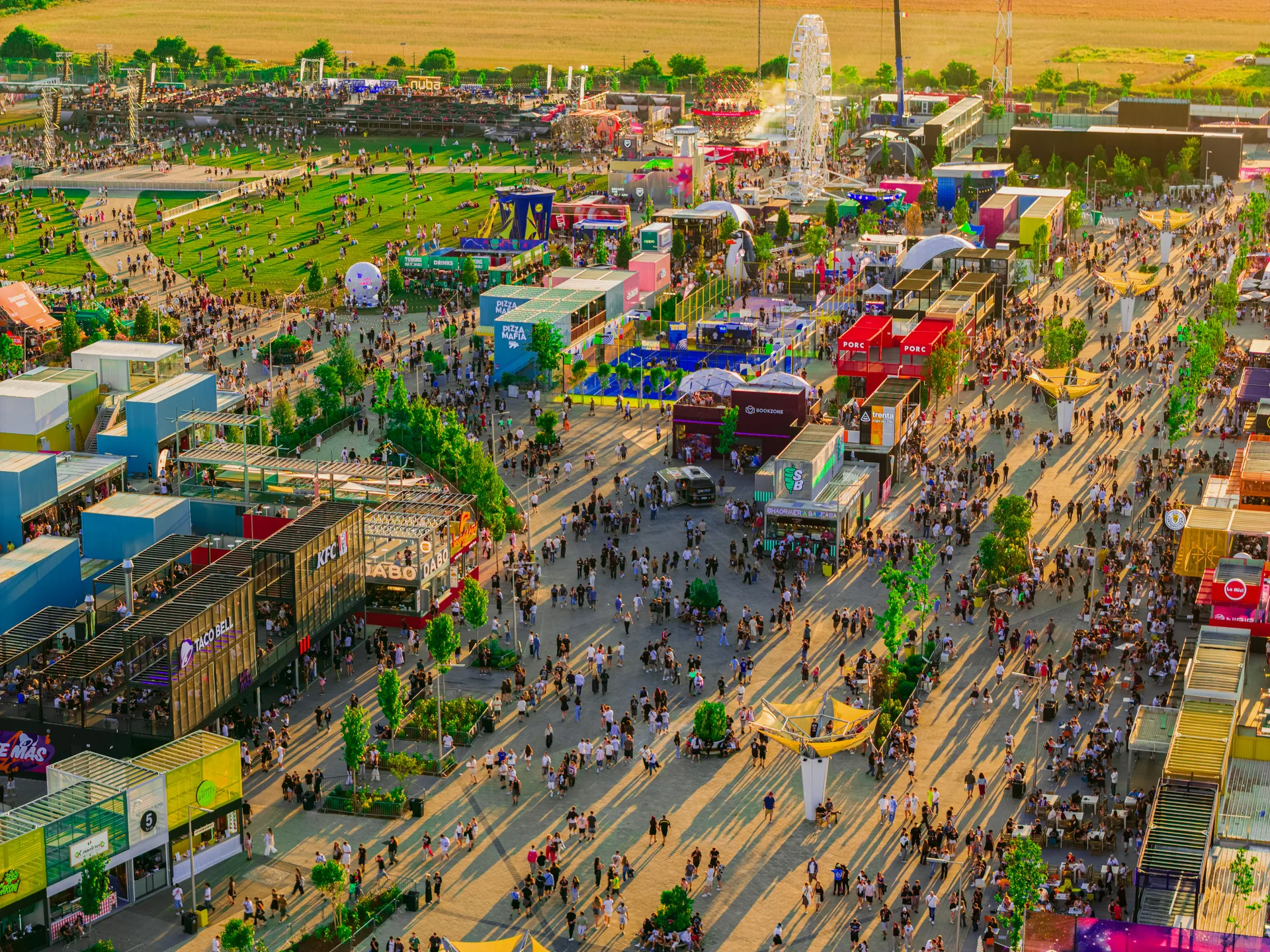
Nibiru wide day

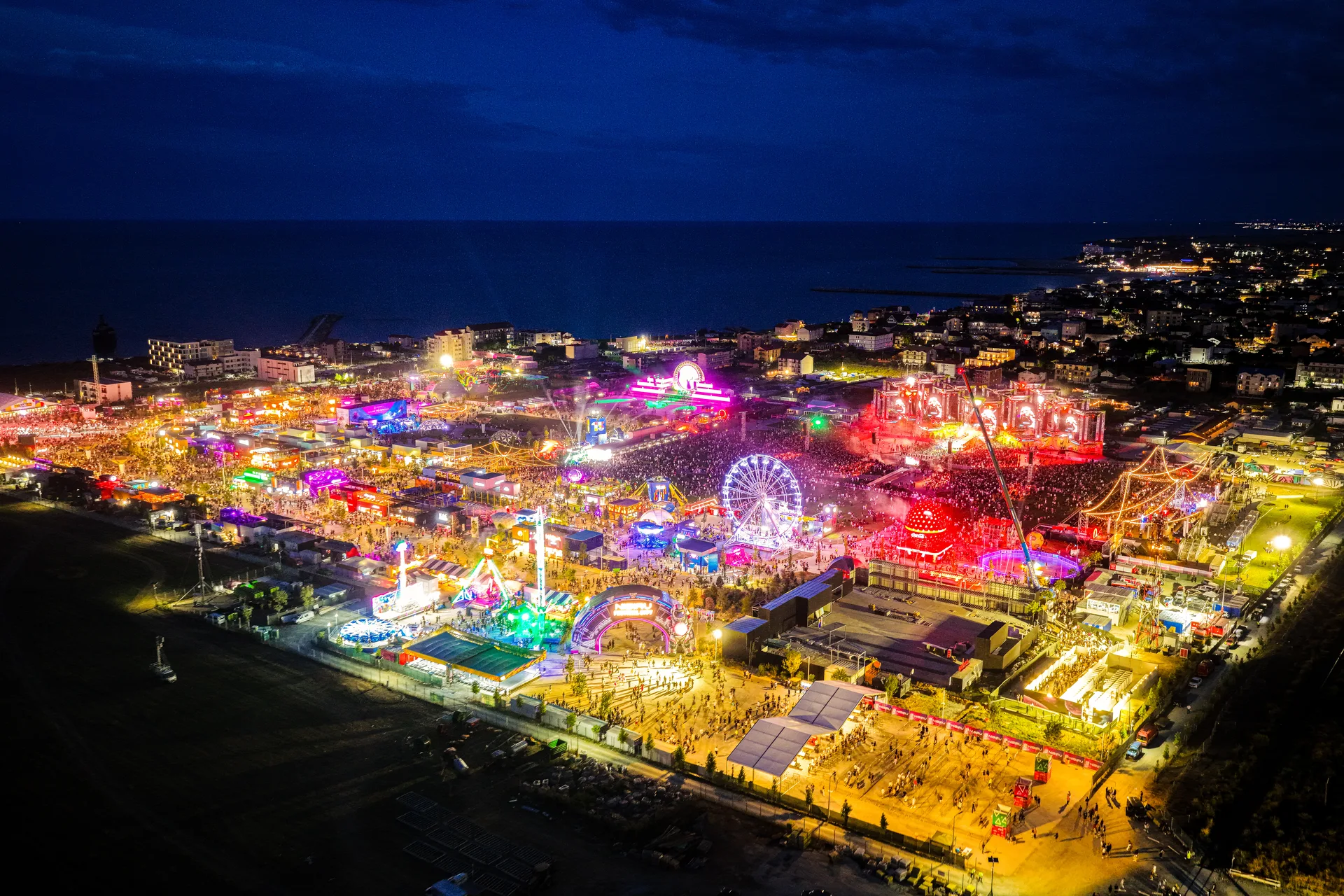
NIBIRU festival-wide shot at night

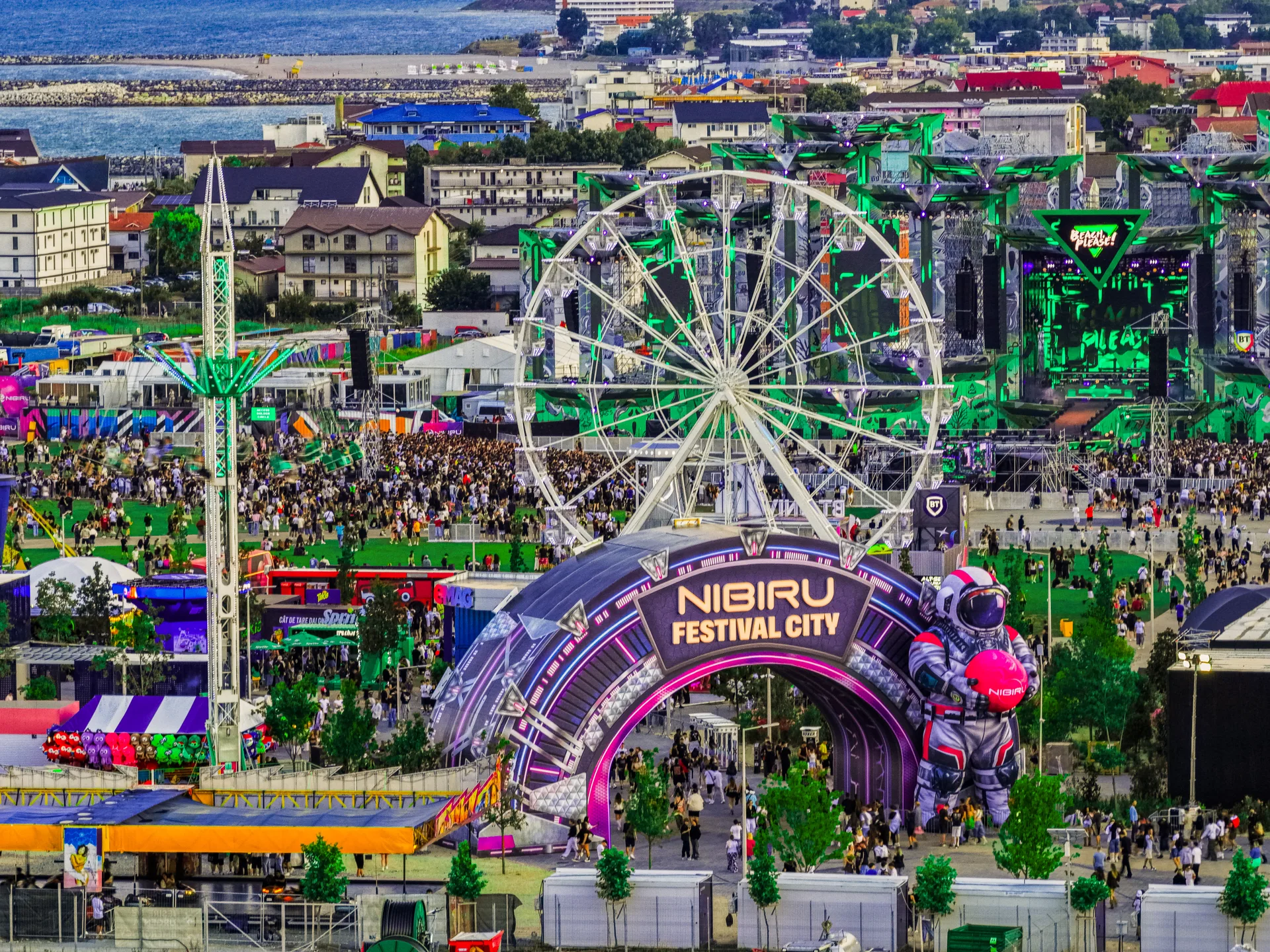
Beach, Please! at NIBIRU

NIBIRU Seaside
