= MV E Evangelia =

Romanian shipwreck

Coordinates: 43°57′N 28°38′E

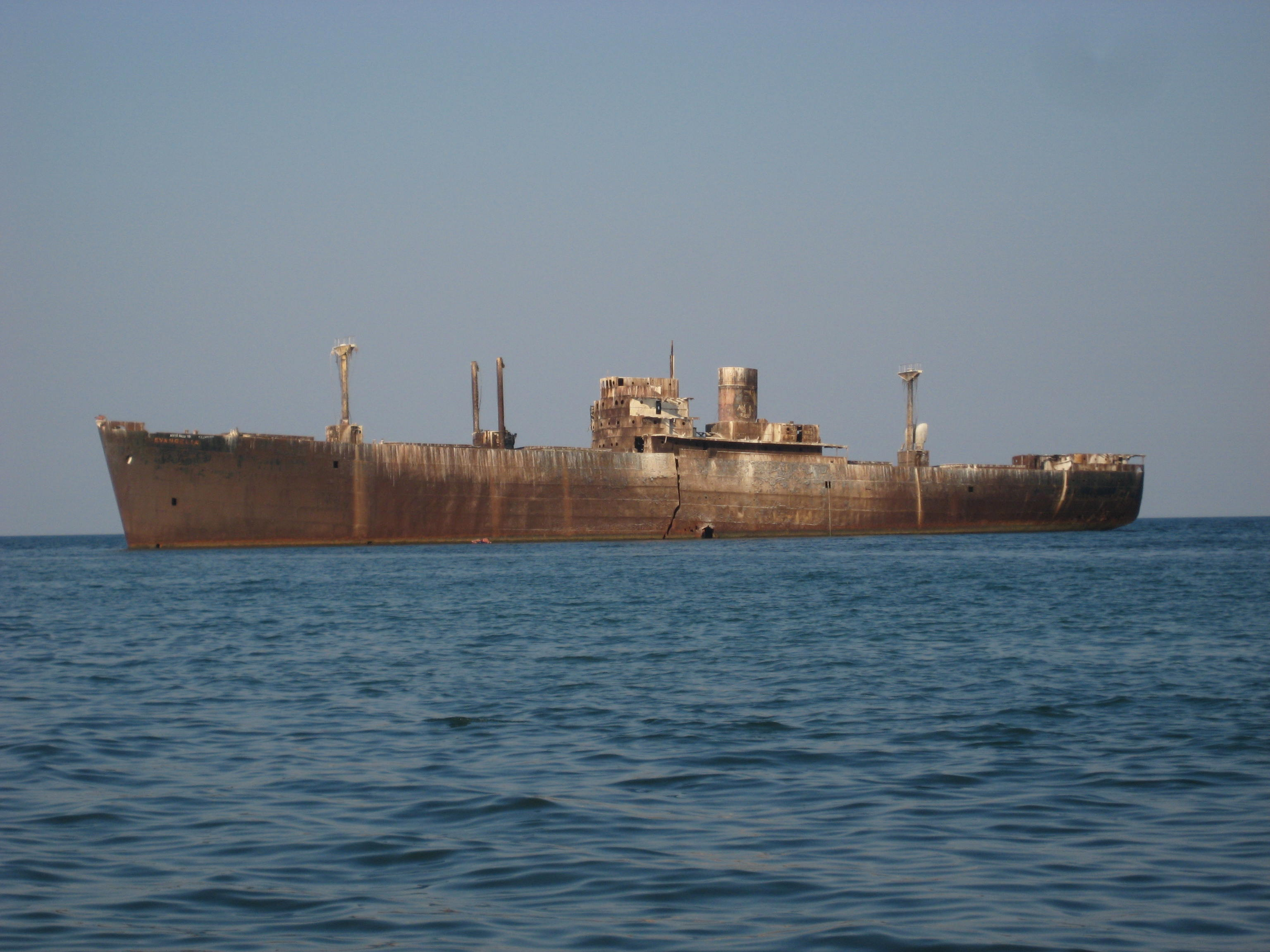
- E Evangelia's wreck at Costinești, Romania

History

United Kingdom, Greece
- Name: Empire Strength (1942–46); Saxon Star (1946–61); Redbrook (1961–65); E Evangelia (1965–68)
- Owner: MoWT (1942–46); Frederick Leyland & Co (1946–50); Lamport & Holt Line (1950–54); Booth Steamship Co (1954–59); Blue Star Line Ltd (1959–61); DL Street Ltd (1961–65); Hegif Compania Naviera (1965–68)
- Operator: Blue Star Line (1942–61); H Embiricos, Greece (1961–68)
- Port of registry: (United Kingdom) Belfast (1942–46); (United Kingdom) London (1946–50); (United Kingdom) Cardiff (1961–65); (Greece) (1965–68)
- Builder: Harland and Wolff, Belfast
- Yard number: 4566
- Launched: 28 May 1942
- Completed: 22 December 1942
- Maiden voyage: 13 January 1943, Liverpool to Sydney
- Identification: UK official number 168519; Call sign BFDV (1942–46); call sign SZWI (1965–68)
- Fate: Ran aground 15 October 1968

General characteristics
- Tonnage: 7,355 GRT; tonnage under deck 6,771; 5,120 NRT
- Length: 431.4 ft (131.5 m)
- Beam: 57.3 ft (17.5 m)
- Draught: 38 ft 8 in (11.79 m)
- Depth: 33.6 ft (10.2 m)
- Installed power: 490 NHP
- Propulsion: 6-cylinder marine Diesel engine
- Sensors & processing systems: wireless direction finding; echo sounding device
- Armament: DEMS (1942–45)
- Notes: sister ship: Nelson Star

MV E Evangelia is a shipwrecked 7,355-gross register ton (GRT) refrigerated cargo ship at Costinești on the Black Sea coast of Romania. She was built in Northern Ireland in 1942 as the Empire ship Empire Strength, was operated by Blue Star Line from 1942 to 1961, was bought by Greek shipowners in 1965 and wrecked in 1968. The ship had four names in her career, having been renamed Saxon Star in 1946, Redbrook in 1961 and E Evangelia in 1965.

== Building ==
Harland and Wolff's Belfast yard built the ship for the UK Ministry of War Transport (MoWT). She was launched on 28 May as Empire Strength and completed in December.

She was a motor ship, with a six-cylinder four-stroke single-acting marine Diesel engine developing 490 NHP. The engine was built by Harland and Wolff but was a Burmeister & Wain design from Denmark. Her navigation equipment included wireless direction finding and an echo sounding device.

The MoWT appointed Blue Star Line to manage her.

== Second World War service ==
Empire Strength left Harland and Wolff in Belfast on 22 December 1942 and reached Liverpool the next day. On 13 January 1943 she began her maiden voyage from Liverpool to Sydney via the Panama Canal. It included three convoys: ON 161 from Liverpool to New York, NG 342 from there to Guantánamo Bay and GZ 22 from there to Cristóbal. After passing through the Panama Canal between 18 and 20 February the ship crossed the Pacific Ocean independently, reaching Sydney on 20 March. Records for the rest of the year are incomplete, but the ship seems to have continued to run between Australia and Britain via Panama. She ended 1943 sailing from Australia to Britain as usual via Panama, Guantánamo Bay and New York. She left Melbourne on 12 December and reached Cardiff on 21 February.

Empire Strength spent the rest of 1944 shipping frozen meat from Buenos Aires to Britain and the Mediterranean. Her voyages in and near European and Mediterranean waters were mostly in convoys, but her movements in or near South American waters were mostly independent and unescorted. For the first trip she was in Buenos Aires 17–25 April, called at Freetown, Sierra Leone 9–11 May and then spent a fortnight on convoys in the Mediterranean calling at Gibraltar, Algiers, Malta, Augusta and Taranto, and returning via Casablanca to Buenos Aires, where she was in port 3–22 August. She then took her second cargo of Argentinian frozen meat from via Freetown to England, arriving at the end of September. For her third cargo she was in Buenos Aires from 16 November to 4 December and took it via Gibraltar to Haifa, where she was in port 4–8 January 1945.

In 1945 Empire Strength returned to Australia, sailing from Haifa via the Suez Canal, Port Sudan and Aden and reaching Fremantle on 13 February. She called at Port Pirie, Adelaide and Port Lincoln before crossing the Tasman Sea to New Zealand, where she called at Wellington and New Plymouth. On 22 March she left New Plymouth for England, going via the Panama Canal, Charleston, New York and Convoy HX 354 to Liverpool and reaching London on 19 May. On 11 August she left London for New York, where she arrived on 24 August. She was still in port when Japan surrendered on 2 September. Six days later she left for the Philippines via the Panama Canal, reaching Manila on 21 October. On 16 November she left for New Zealand, where she was in Auckland 2–6 December and New Plymouth 8–21 December.

== Saxon Star ==
In 1946 the MoWT sold Empire Strength to the Blue Star-controlled company Frederick Leyland & Co Ltd, which renamed her Saxon Star.

In 1950 Blue Star transferred Saxon Star from Frederick Leyland to another company in the group, Lamport and Holt Line. In 1954 she was transferred to another Blue Star-controlled company, Booth Steamship Co. In 1959 she was transferred to the direct ownership of Blue Star Line itself. In August 1961 Blue Star sold her for £117,000 to DL Street Ltd of Cardiff.

=== Namesakes ===
The ship was the second of three Blue Star vessels to have been called Saxon Star. The first was a 5,715 GRT steamship built in 1899 for the Federal Steam Navigation Co Ltd as Kent and bought by the Vestey Brothers in 1915. They renamed her first Brodlea in 1915, and then Saxonstar in 1920, altering this to Saxon Star in 1929.

The third Saxon Star was a 1976-built 11,800 GRT motor ship that Blue Star wet-chartered from the German company Hamburg Süd from 1983 to 1986. With Hamburg Süd she had four different names, and while with Blue Star she was named Saxon Star.

== Redbrook and E Evangelia ==
E Evangelia's wreck is on the coast of Romania

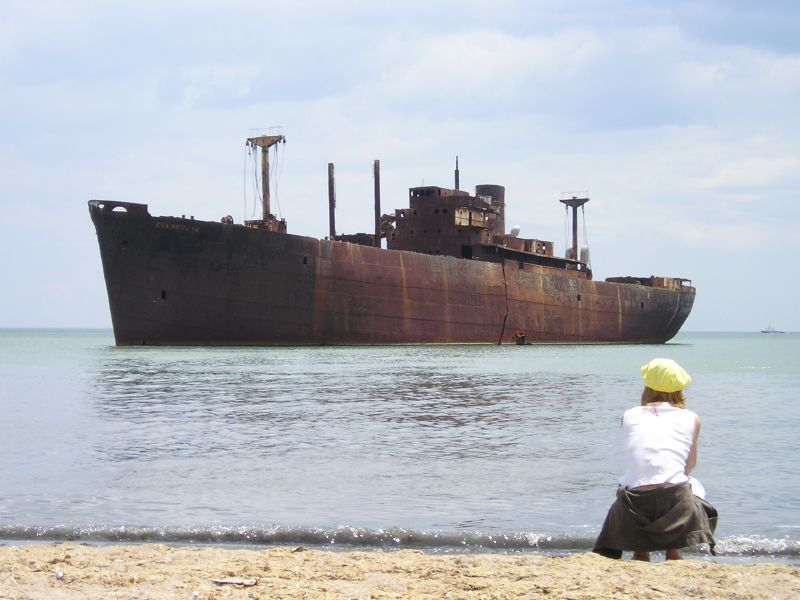
E Evangelia's wreck at Costinești

DL Street renamed the ship Redbrook. In 1965 Street sold her to Hegif Compania Naviera SA of Greece, who renamed her E Evangelia.

On 15 October 1968 E Evangelia was sailing in ballast from Rijeka in Yugoslavia to Constanța in Romania when she ran aground in the Black Sea off Costinești about 16 nautical miles (30 km) south of Constanța. She was declared a total loss, and there is a suggestion that the shipwreck could have been an insurance fraud.

The ship remains a wreck at Costinești. Her back is broken, two large areas of plates are missing from her starboard side, and the entire ship's superstructure has collapsed. Costinești is a small seaside resort, for which the wreck is a local attraction.
