= Beach, Please! Festival =

Annual urban music festival in Romania

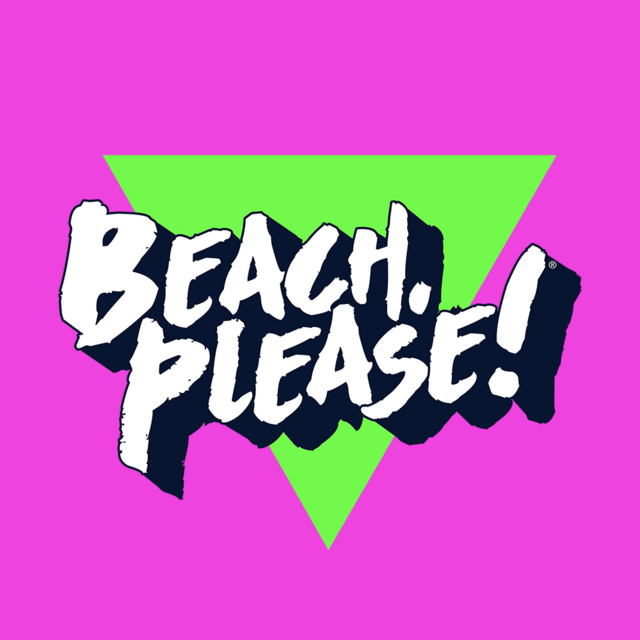

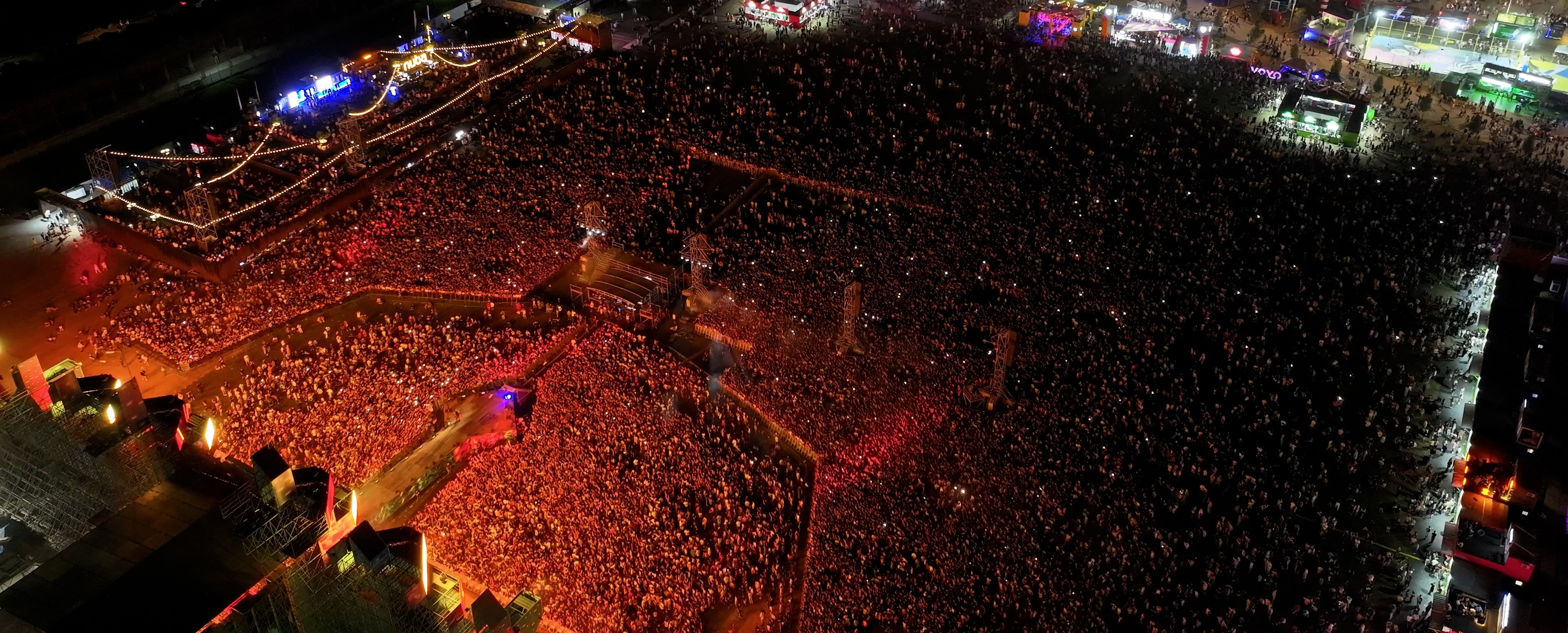
- Genre: Hip-hop / Trap music / Pop music
- Location: Costinești
- Country: Romania
- Years active: 2022–present
- Attendance: 600.000+ (2026)
- Organiser: Andrei Șelaru
- Website: beach-please.ro

Beach, Please! Festival is a hip-hop festival held in the resort town of Costinești, Constanța County, Romania organised by Andrei Șelaru. Founded in 2022, the festival is mainly known for bringing both native Romanian artist, as well as massive international names such as Travis Scott, A$AP Rocky, 21 Savage, Wiz Khalifa, Future and Playboi Carti. In 2025, it became the largest hip-hop festival in Europe. The festival attracts attendees from Romania and abroad, including from France, Germany, Mexico, Japan and the United States.

The festival takes place on a site of approximately 21 hectares (52 acres) near the Black Sea shore. According to figures reported by the organizers and covered by the press, the 2026 edition recorded a total footfall of over 600,000 people, with a peak simultaneous attendance of 155,000, including 30,000 foreign tourists.

== History ==
The festival was co-founded in 2022 by Andrei Șelaru (known as Selly) and Global Records, with the first edition taking place on the beach on May 1. From the 2024 edition onwards, the organizers moved the event to July and expanded the venue to approximately 21 hectares (52 acres). In a 2025 interview, Andrei Șelaru stated that he has become the sole shareholder of Beach, Please! Festival, having acquired the stake previously held by Global Records.

Investment grew year on year, reaching approximately €14 million in 2024, according to statements by Andrei Șelaru, covering costs for artists, infrastructure, and venue setup. For the 2025 edition, the organizers allocated €16 million for production and a further €3 million for venue development. Attendance has grown consistently, with industry publications describing the festival as one of the largest music events in Europe from the 2025 edition onwards.

In 2026, the organizers announced the launch of NIBIRU, a seasonal resort project on the Romanian Black Sea coast, of which the festival forms a part.

== Editions ==
=== 2022 ===
The first edition of the festival took place between 29 April and 1 May 2022 on Costinești beach. The lineup featured exclusively Romanian hip-hop and trap artists, including Puya, Deliric, Connect-R, Grasu XXL, Killa Fonic and others. Total attendance was estimated at 35,000 people over the three days. Attendees aged 14 to 18 were required to present a signed parental consent form, in accordance with the organizers' participation rules.

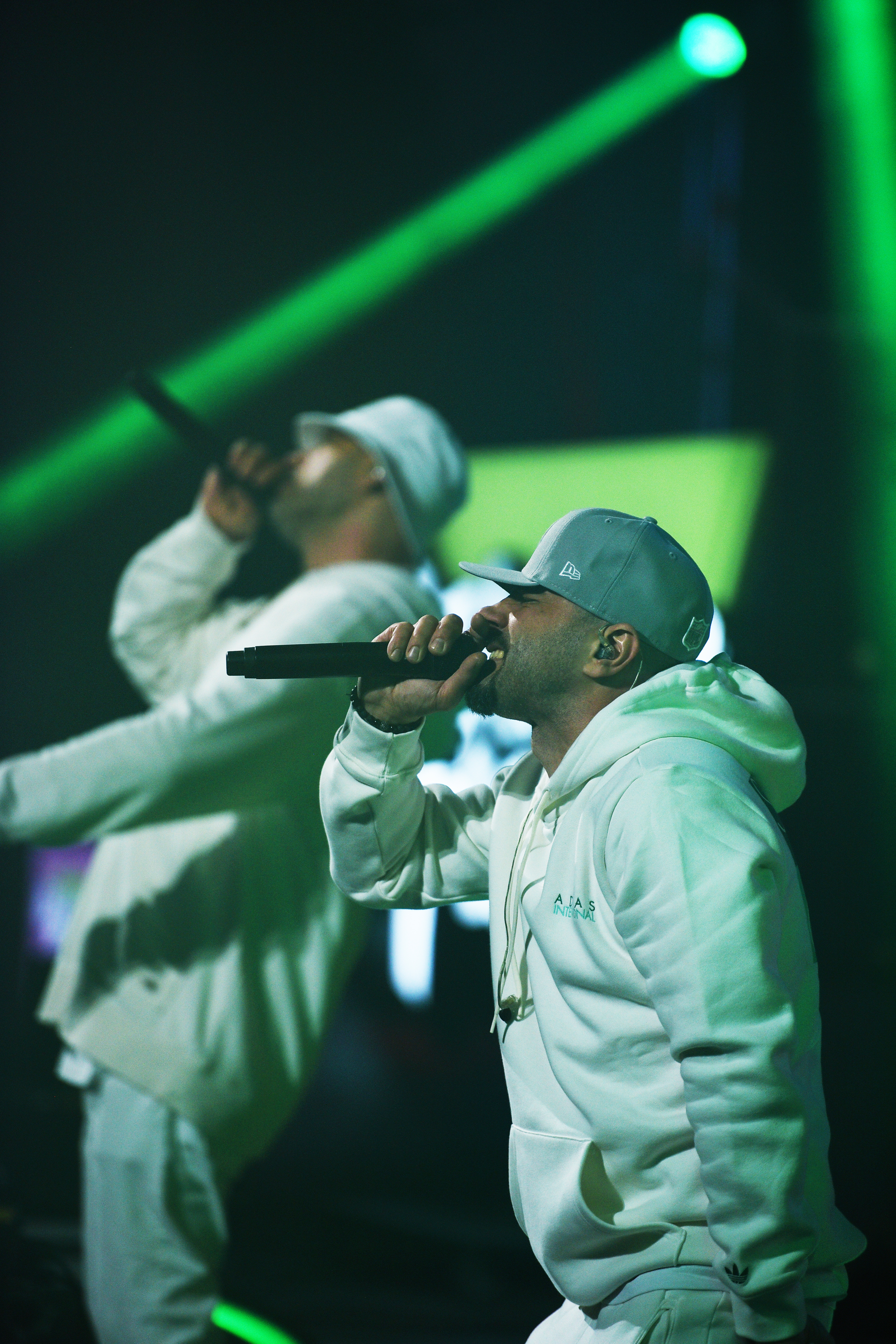
B.U.G. Mafia, Beach, Please!, 2022

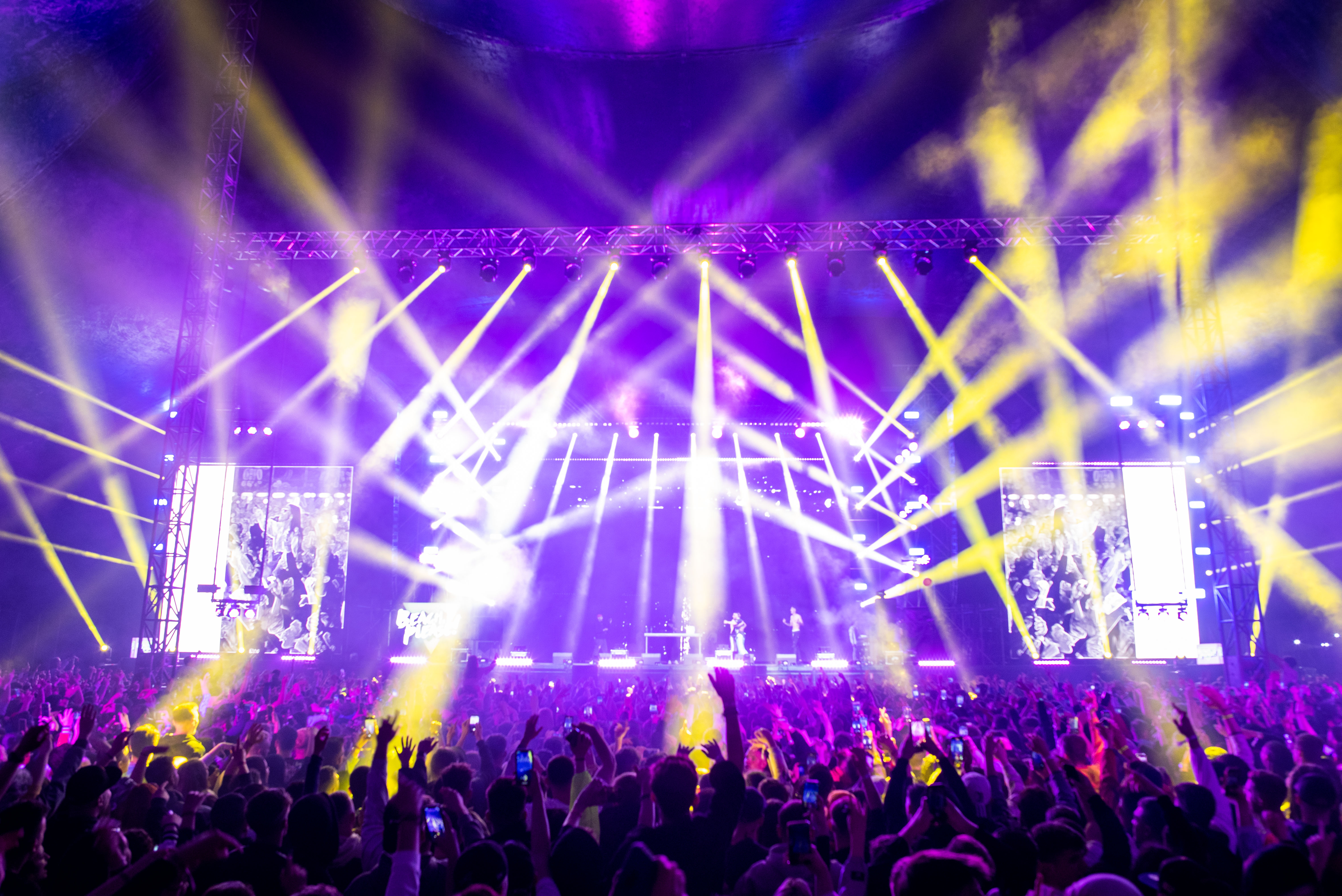
Main Stage, Beach, Please! Festival, 2022

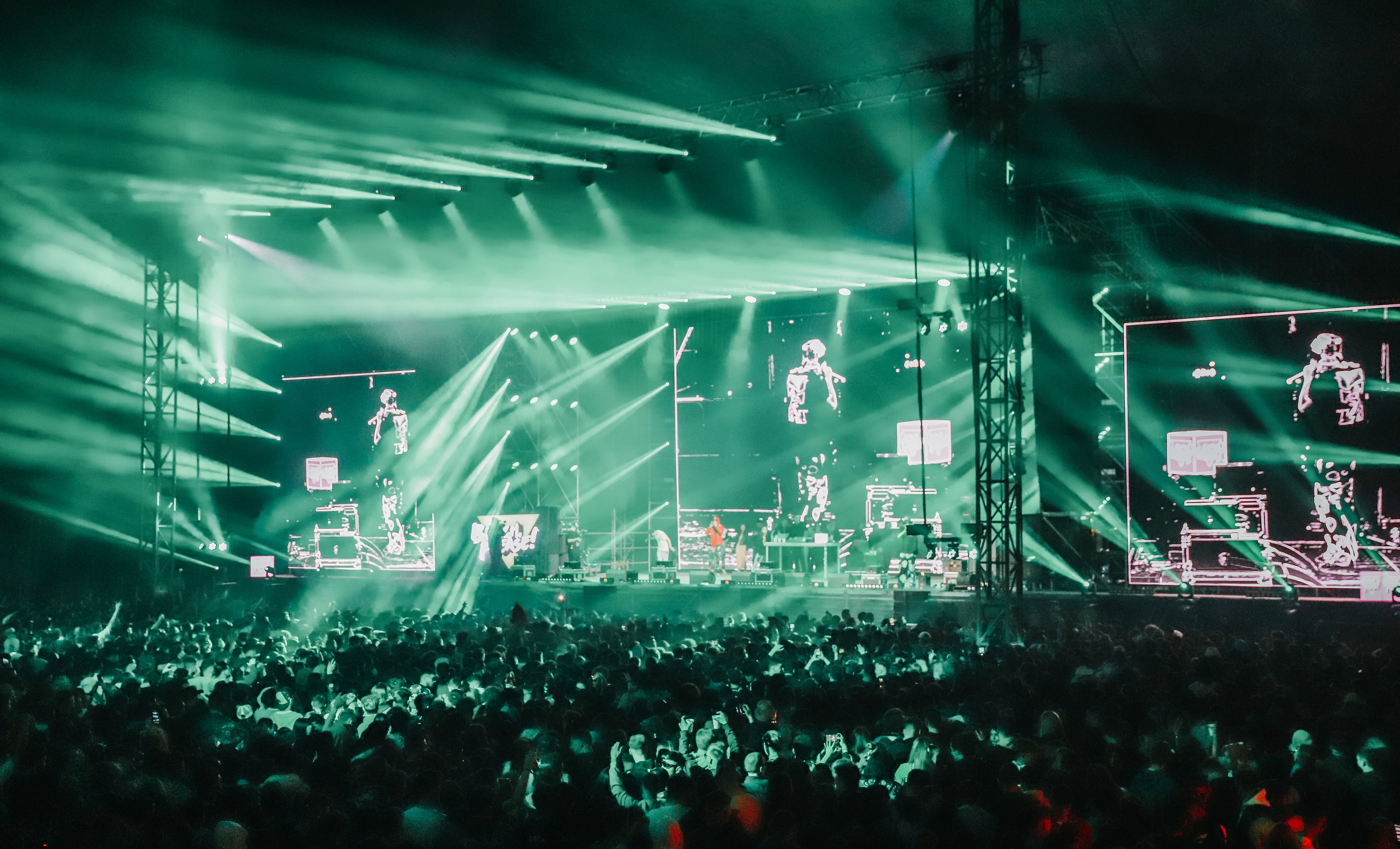
Green lights on the main stage at Beach, Please!, 2022

=== 2023 ===
The 2023 edition was held from 27 to 30 April and marked the first appearance of international artists, including DaBaby, Central Cee, 6ix9ine, NLE Choppa, Sfera Ebbasta, Nervo, Vinai, Lucas, John Newman, Afrojack, alongside Romanian artists such as B.U.G Mafia, Puya, Ian, Amuly, Oscar, Azteca, Bvcovia, NANE, RAVA, Lil Cagula, Petre Ștefan and Deliric. The festival attracted over 150,000 attendees, according to figures reported by the organizers.

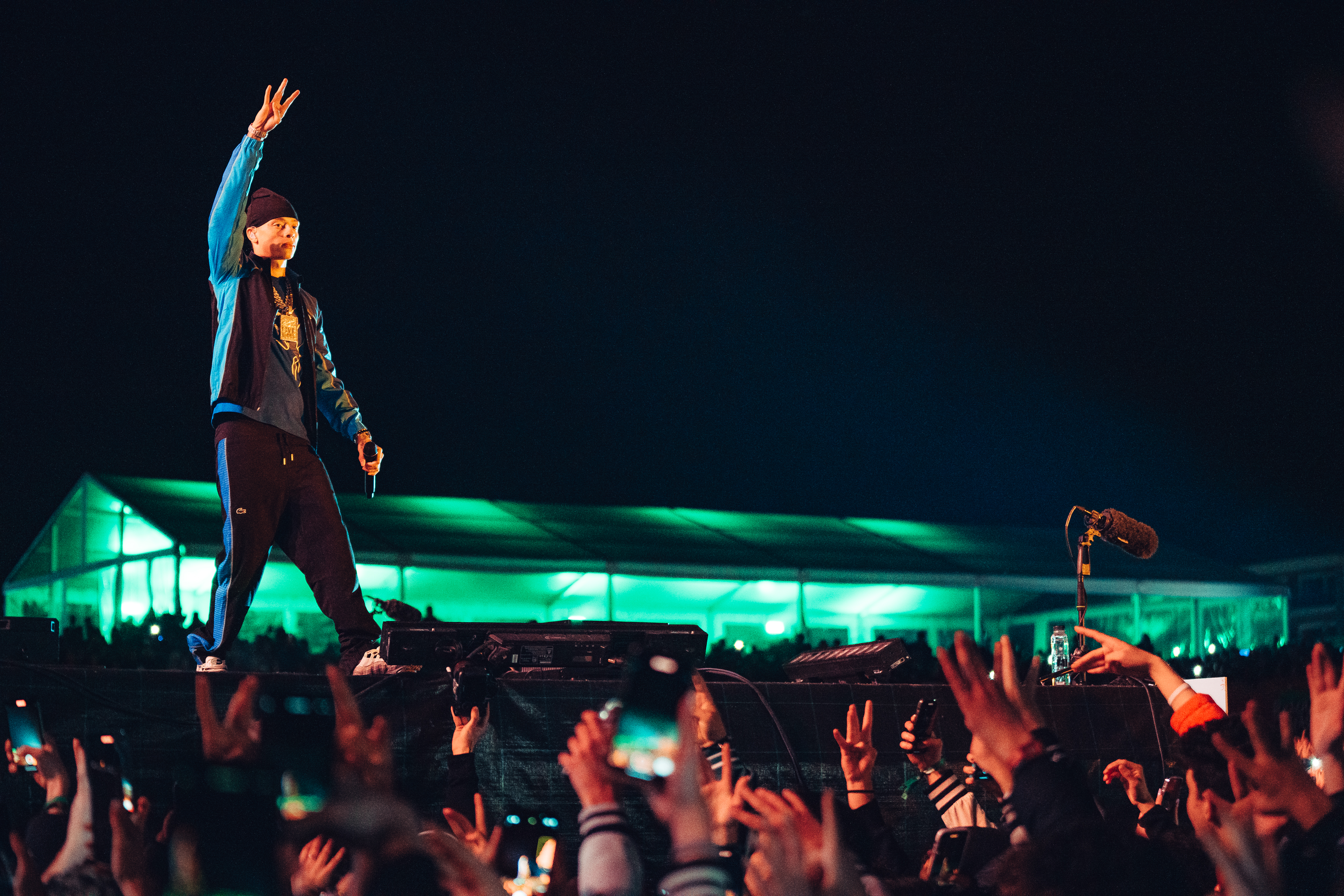
Central Cee la Beach, Please! Festival, 2023

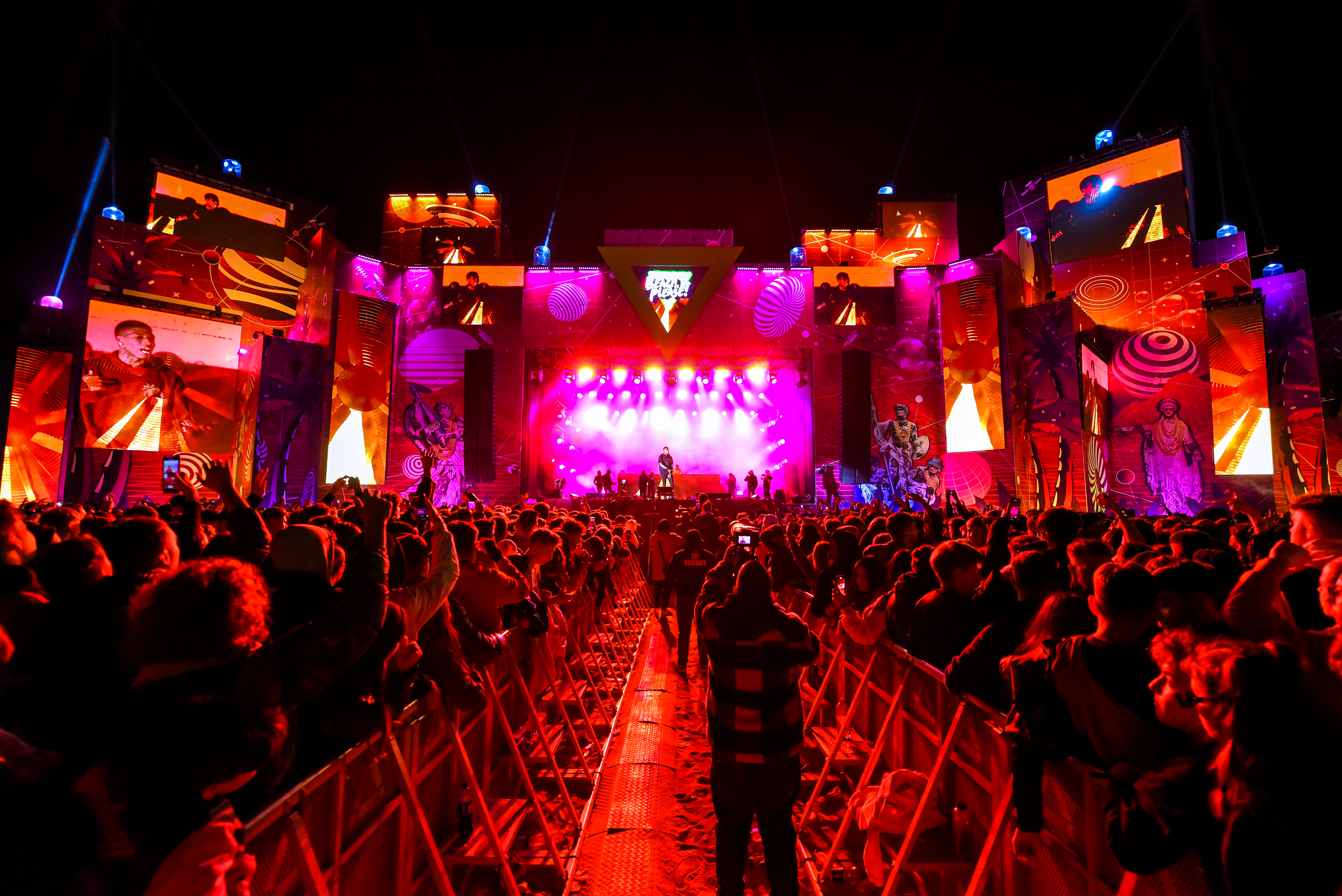
NLE Choppa, Beach, Please! Festival, 2023

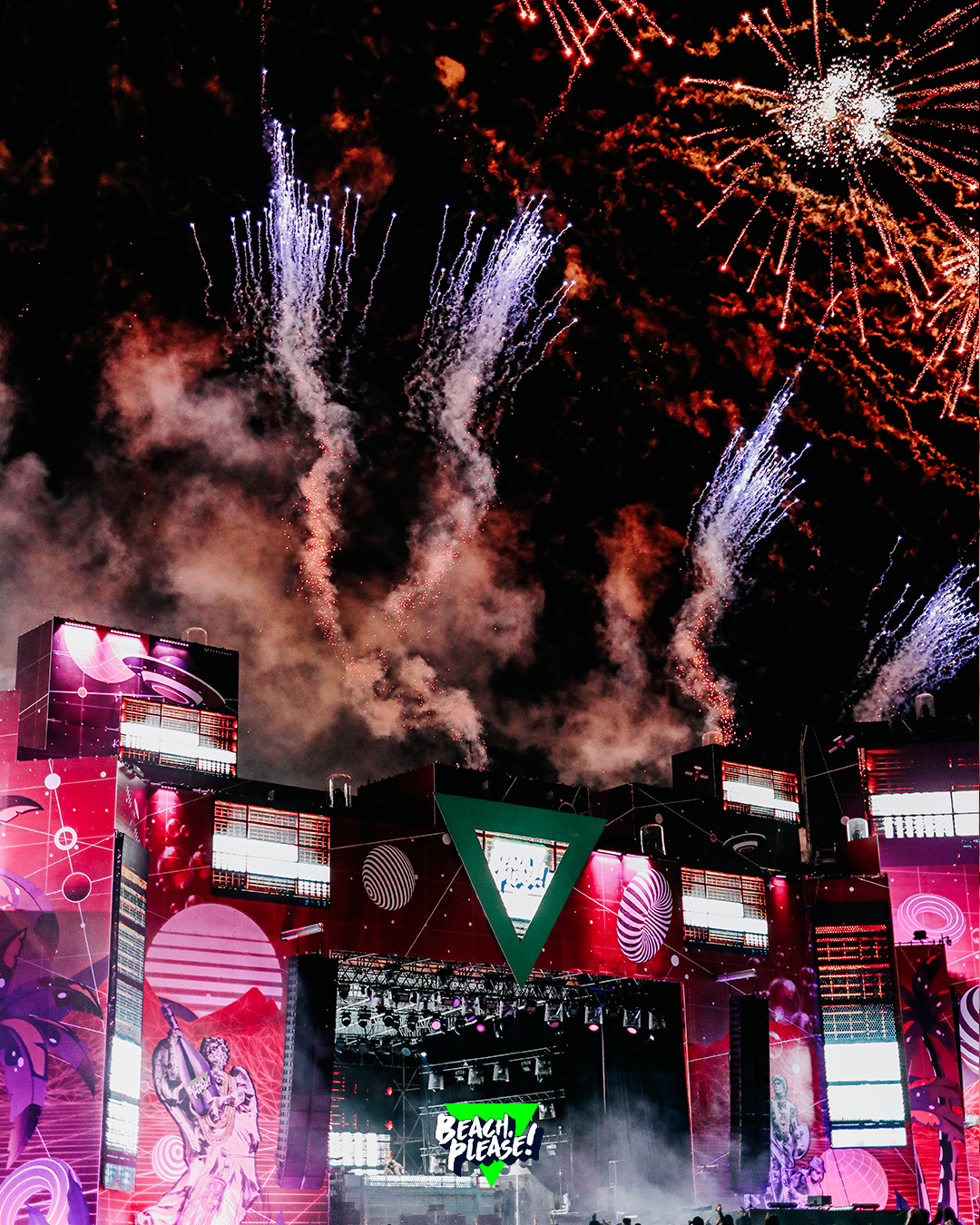
Fireworks, main stage, Beach, Please! 2023

=== 2024 ===
The 2024 edition was held from 11 and 14 July in Costinești, marking the festival's third edition. The organizers estimated a total attendance of 510,000 people. The production featured four stages with distinct themes, set across the expanded seafront venue. The international lineup included Travis Scott, Wiz Khalifa, Yeat, Don Toliver, and Ice Spice, alongside Romanian hip-hop and trap artists. The Romanian lineup featured artists such as Killa Fonic, Ian, Oscar, NANE, RAVA, Amuly, Bvcovia and Azteca, as well as emerging acts from the local trap scene.

The headline act was American rapper Travis Scott. He took the stage three hours late on the final night of the festival. During the 2024 edition, minor medical incidents were reported due to high temperatures and overcrowding, requiring the intervention of first aid teams.

Brazilian artist Anitta recreated one of her music videos on the festival stage. According to IQ Magazine, the 2024 edition recorded over 125,000 attendees per day, following the relocation of the festival to a larger venue.

American rapper Wiz Khalifa was detained by police at the festival after smoking cannabis on stage during his performance. At first instance, the Constanța Tribunal fined him 3,600 lei. Following an appeal by the Directorate for Investigating Organized Crime and Terrorism (DIICOT), the Constanța Court of Appeal sentenced him in December 2025 to nine months in prison, to be served in custody. The artist challenged the decision, but in February 2026 the Constanța Court of Appeal rejected his appeal for annulment. At his request, the case was later transferred to Bucharest. On 3 November 2026, the Bucharest Court of Appeal granted the artist's appeal for annulment, set aside the conviction and cancelled the enforcement warrant, ordering a retrial of DIICOT's appeal. At the retrial hearing on 12 November 2026, which he attended by video link, Wiz Khalifa admitted the offence and said he was willing to do community service. The court postponed its ruling until 19 November 2026.

=== 2025 ===
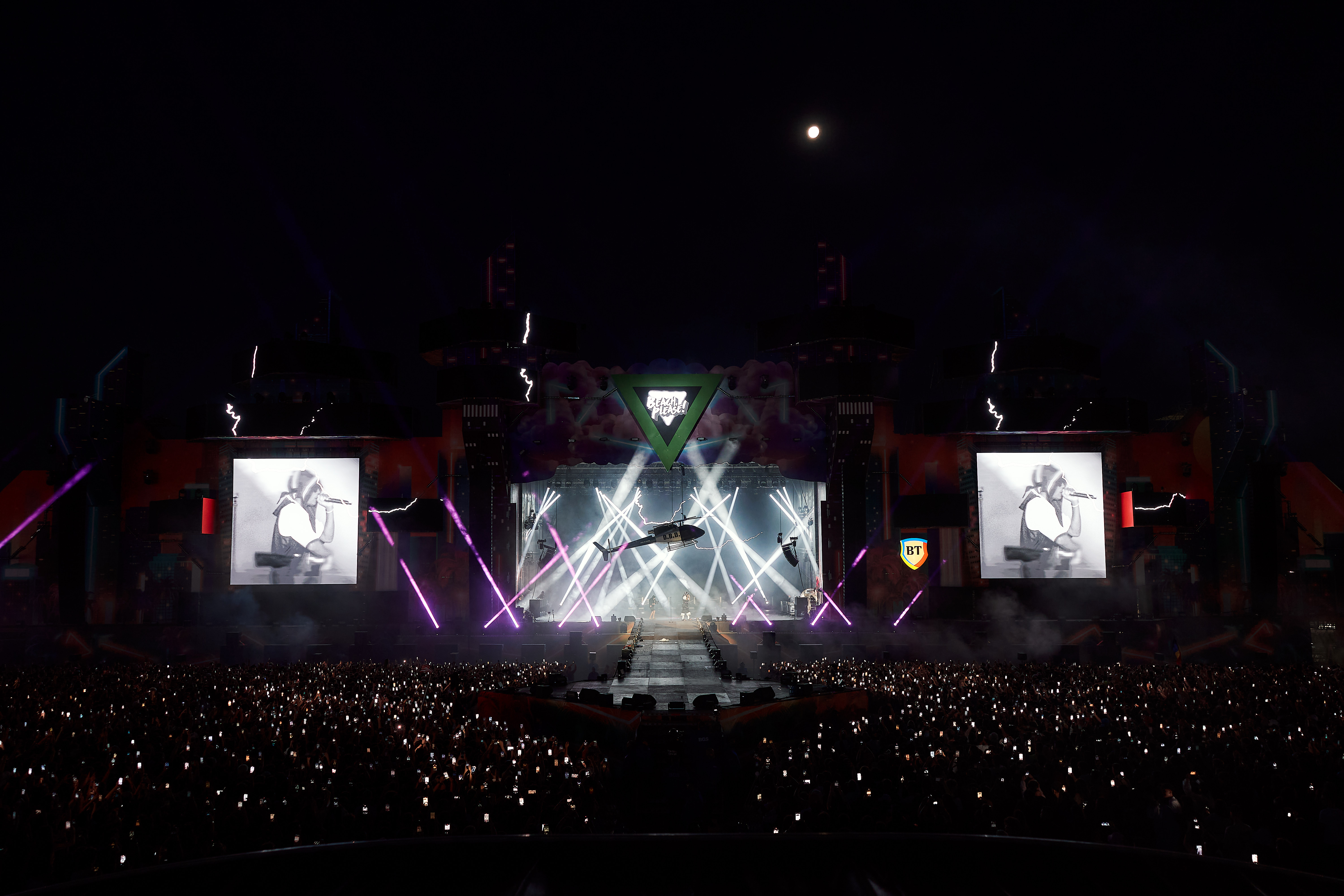
A$AP Rocky, Beach, Please! Festival, 2025

Beach, Please! Festival 2025, the festival's fourth edition, took place between 9 and 13 July in Costinești. Headliners included A$AP Rocky, 21 Savage, Lil Baby and Young Thug, alongside other international artists such as Yeat, Swae Lee, Lil Pump and Denzel Curry. Artists 6ix9ine, initially announced for the lineup, did not perform; the organizers stated he was unable to leave the United States at that time.

A$AP Rocky arrived at the festival by helicopter, landing behind the main stage before his performance. Young Thug appeared on stage displaying the Romanian flag, with a specially designed stage set featuring special effects created for his show. Lil Baby delivered a performance that included and extensive use of special effects, according to press reports. According to Agerpres, the festival took place across 21-hectares site in Costinești, with infrastructure that included 10 kilometres of buried technical networks and over 500 planted trees.

During this edition, a teenager was injured after jumping off the festival stage following an interaction with American rapper Destroy Lonely. The teenager was discharged in good condition after five days of hospitalisation. The organizer subsequently announced that audience members would no longer be permitted on stage. Additionally, artist Albert NBN was sanctioned by the Gendarmerie of Romania for language used during his performance at the festival.

According to figures reported by the organizers and covered by the press, over 100,000 people attended daily, with total footfall exceeding 500,000 and a peak simultaneous attendance of 155,000. Press reports concluded that these figures made it the largest festival in Europe at that time.

=== 2026 ===
The 2026 edition was between 8 and 12 July in Costinești. Accounced headliners include Playboi Carti, Tyla, Future, Don Toliver, Quavo and Yeat. Playboi Carti's participation was announced in January 2026 at an event held during Paris Fashion Week. Future and Tyla, two-time Grammy Award winner (Grammy Award for Best African Music Performance, 2024 and 2026) perform in Romania for the first time.

The edition forms part of the NIBIRU project, a seasonal resort being developed on the Romanian Black Sea coast between Costinești and Tuzla, with a private investment of over €50 million scheduled to open on 16 July 2026.

== Line-up ==
| Edition | Year | Date | Headliners |
|---|---|---|---|
| 1 | 2022 | April 29 – May 1, 2022 | B.U.G. Mafia; Ian; Rava; Amuly; Puya (rapper); Deliric; Connect-R; Grasu XXL; Killa Fonic (exclusively Romanian artists) |
| 2 | 2023 | April 27–30, 2023 | DaBaby; Central Cee; 6ix9ine; NLE Choppa; Afrojack; Sfera Ebbasta |
| 3 | 2024 | July 11–14, 2024 | Travis Scott; Wiz Khalifa; Anitta (singer); Don Toliver; Yeat; Ice Spice |
| 4 | 2025 | July 9–13, 2025 | A$AP Rocky; 21 Savage; Lil Baby; Young Thug; Ken Carson; Yeat |
| 5 | 2026 | July 8–12, 2026 | Playboi Carti; Future; Tyla; Don Toliver; Quavo; Yeat; Che; Sofaygo; Nemzzz; Homixide Gang; Sheck Wes; Jeleel; Rich Amiri; Ski Mask The Slump God; Apollored1; Prettifun; Xaviersobased |
| 6 | 2027 | July 7 - 11 2027 | Lil Uzi Vert; Swae Lee |

== Organization and infrastructure ==
The festival takes place across a site of approximately 21 hectares in the resort of Costinești. According to figures reported by the organizers for the 2025 edition, the venue included 6 hectares of paved surface, over 500 planted trees, 100 kilometres of buried technical networks, and 45 fire hydrants installed within the festival perimeter. Security measures included four advanced medical stations, two mobile hospitals, 150 medical staff and volunteers, 800 security personnel, and 100 surveillance cameras monitored from a central control room.

=== Legal structure ===
The registered trademark Beach, Please! is currently held by the company Beach Please Festival S.R.L., whose sole shareholder is Andrei Șelaru (Selly). The event organization licence is granted to Urban Nights S.R.L., a company led by George Carabelea, which is responsible for the production and operational management of the festival.

== Economic impact ==
The festival generates a significant economic impact on the resort of Costinești and the surrounding region, through increased demand for accommodation, transport, food, and entertainment services. According to the organizers, the estimated economic impact of the 2025 edition exceeded €70 million.

== International attendance ==
The festival attracts attendees from multiple countries each year. According to figures reported by the organizers and covered by the press, the 2025 edition recorded approximately 15,000 foreign tourists from countries including Germany, United Kingdom, Spain, Netherlands, and the Dominican Republic.

== International artists ==
From the 2023 edition onwards, the festival has featured international artists from North American hip-hop and trap music genres. At the 2024 edition, the headline act was Travis Scott, alongside Wiz Khalifa, Anitta, Don Toliver, Yeat, Ice Spice, Trippie Redd, Gucci Mane, Rick Ross and French Montana, several of whom performed in Romania for the first time.

The 2025 edition headliners included A$AP Rocky, 21 Savage, Young Thug and Lil Baby. A$AP Rocky arrived at the festival by helicopter.

=== International media coverage ===
From 2024, the festival has received coverage in international industry publications, including IQ Magazine and Rolling Stone. The festival is a member of YOUROPE (The European Festival Association).

== Public reception ==
=== Positive reception ===
At the 2025 edition, A$AP Rocky took to the main stage at dawn, having arrived by helicopter behind the stage. Addressing the crowd, the artist delivered a message against racism: "It doesn't matter if you're white or Black, purple, brown or yellow — we're all the same." He also stated that he considered the concert "the best one I've ever been to".

Florin Negruțiu, journalist and television personality, publicly expressed support for the festival, defending it against critics and describing it as a positive cultural phenomenon for the younger generation. He stated that safety measures at the festival are strict, and that any problems involving young people occur outside the festival perimeter, not within it.

Oana Stănescu, television presenter, published an article titled "Warning: I went to Beach, Please! and I liked it", in which she described the experience as positive and defended the event against negative public perception, writing: "This is not a lost generation. It is a generation that owns its feelings. That wants to understand, to heal, to be better."

Ioana Câmpean, journalist at G4 Media, published an editorial describing the festival as a mirror of the younger generation, with qualities and flaws typical of youth and comparable to those of previous generations.

During the 2025 edition, artist Inna delivered an anti-drug message from the main stage, declaring that "smart people don't do drugs — they work for their passion." Smiley and Connect-R also addressed the crowd with positive messages.

Alida Mocanu, journalist at Euronews Romania, commented on the Beach, Please! phenomenon, stating that young attendees are no different from previous generations, and that responsibility for the quality of the experience lies with the organizers and adults involved.

=== Negative reception ===
Diana Șucu, businesswoman and wife of Dan Șucu, owner of Rapid, FC Voluntari, Genoa CFC and Mobexpert, publicly criticised the festival in a social media post, writing: "These young people will lead Romania. They will vote soon. What we see at Beach, Please! is not freedom, it is total decadence. Honestly? I miss order. I miss Ceaușescu."

Dragoș Coman, member of parliament for the far-right party Alliance for the Union of Romanians (AUR), criticised the festival in an official statement, declaring that "Events such as the Beach, Please! festival, which has become a national phenomenon, raise serious questions about the direction, values and contemporary culture."

== Gallery ==
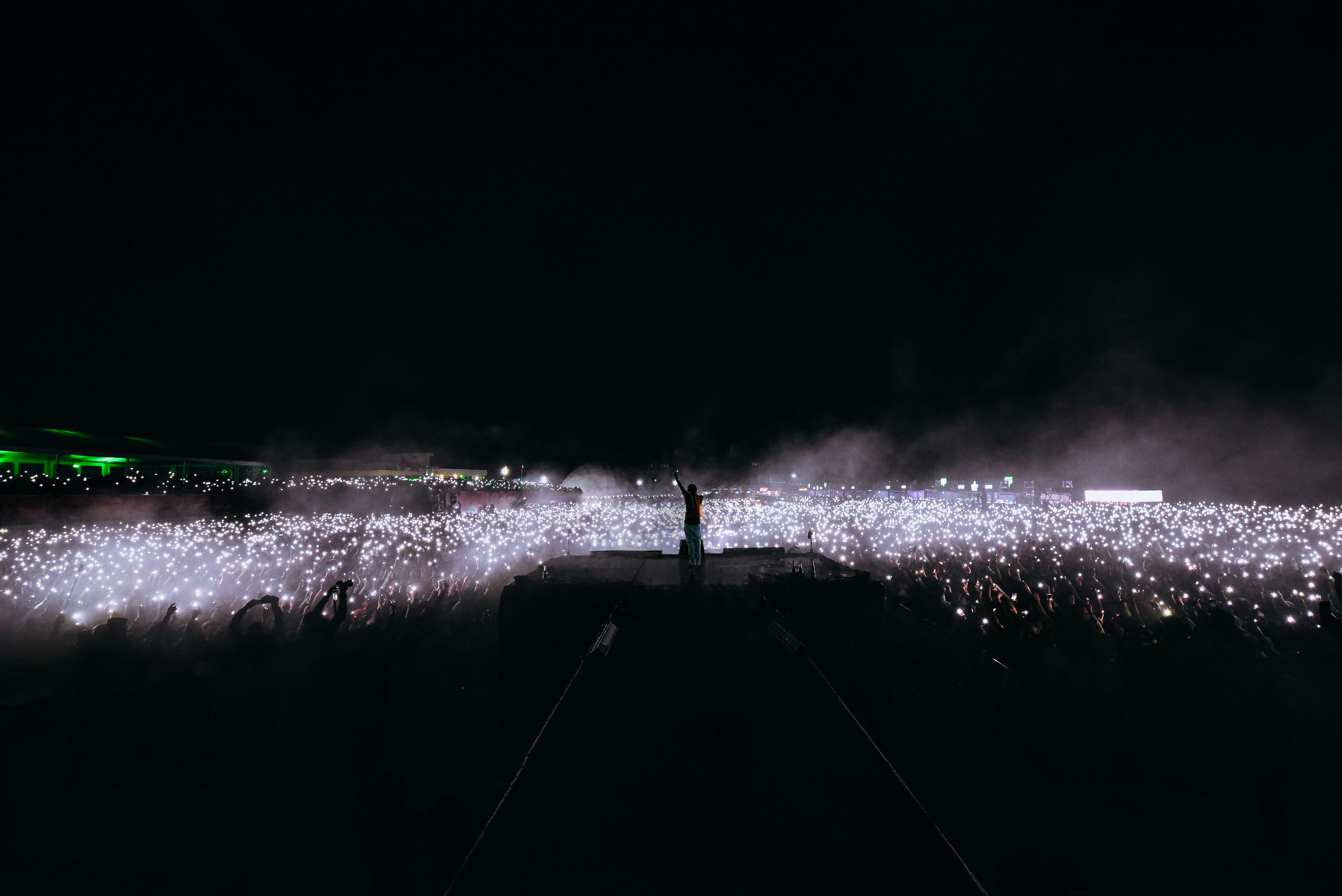
Beach, Please! Festival 2023, Costinești, Romania.

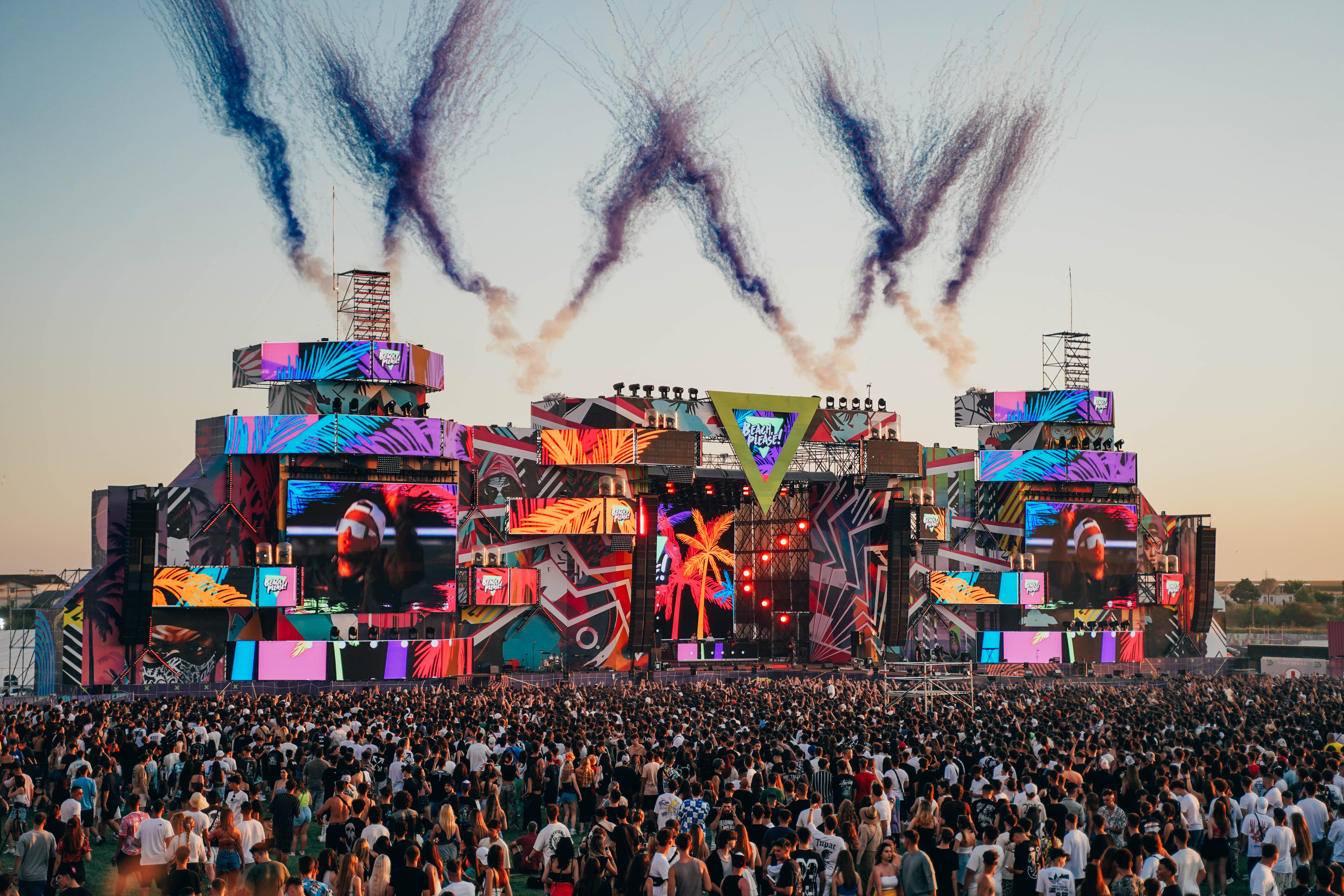
The main stage and the audience at the 2024 “Beach, Please!” Festival in Costinești, Romania.

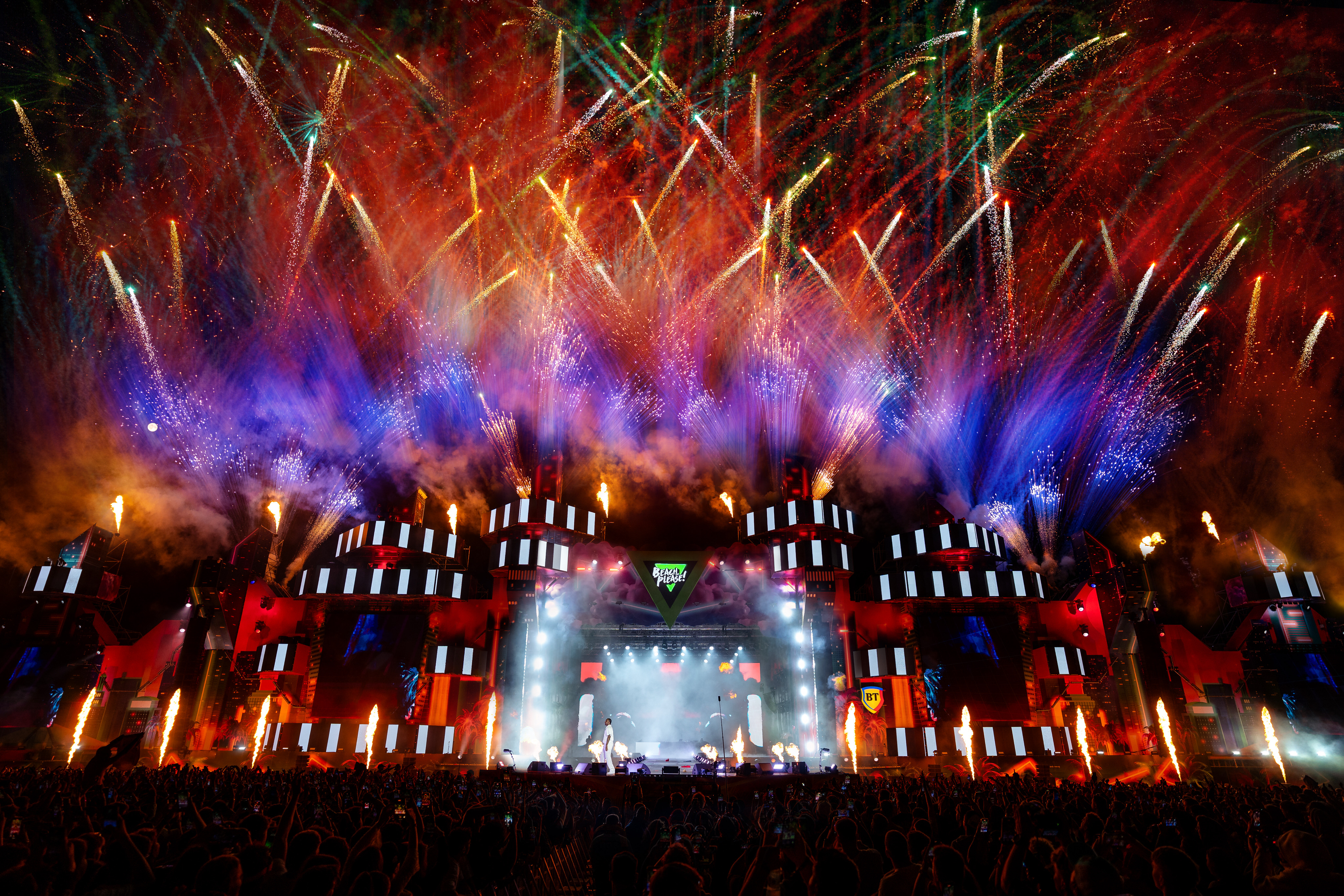
Fireworks display above the main stage, Beach, Please! 2025, Costinești, Romania.

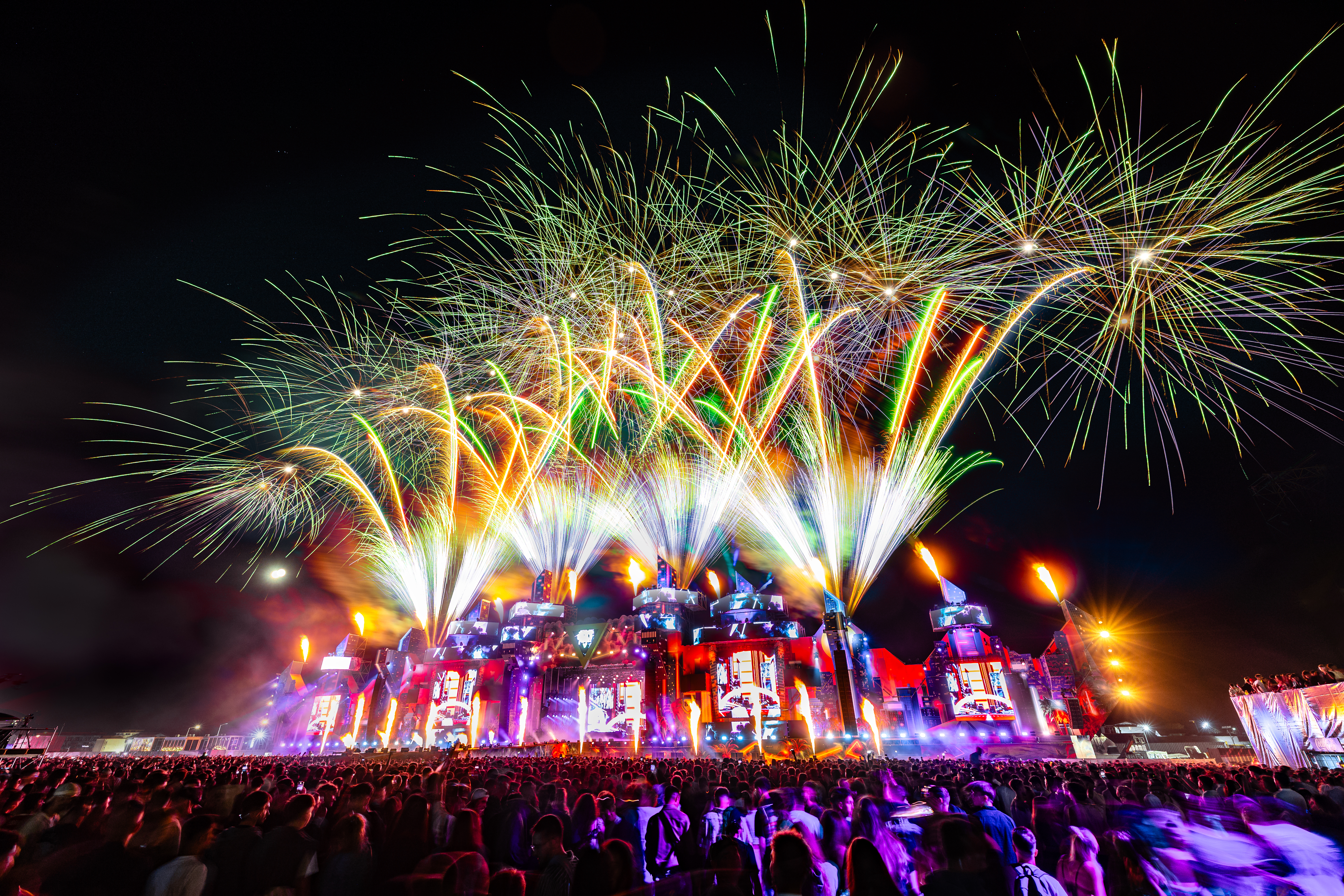
Panoramic view of the crowd and the main stage, with fireworks, at Beach, Please! 2025, Costinești, Romania.
