= Tuzla, Constanța =

Tuzla
- Commune
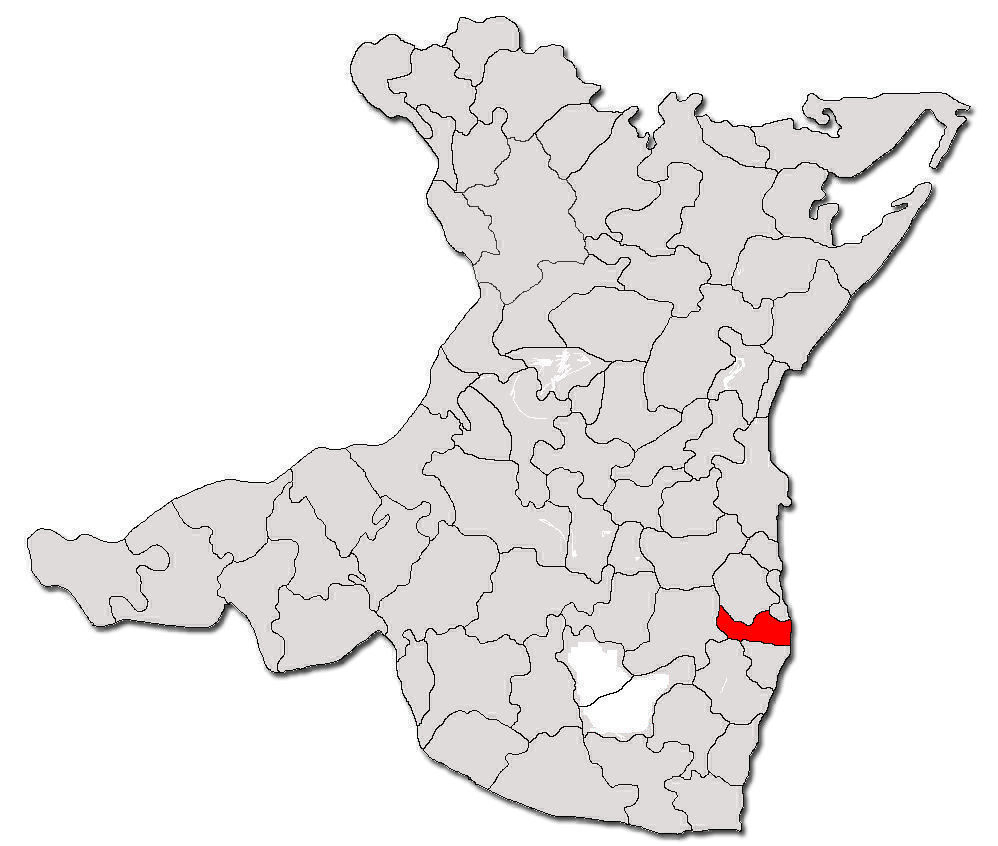
- Location in Constanța County

- Location in Romania
- Coordinates: 44°00′N 28°38′E
- Country: Romania
- County: Constanța

Government
  - Mayor (2020–2024): Taner Reșit (PSD)
- Area: 54.09 km^{2} (20.88 sq mi)
- Elevation: 6 m (20 ft)
- Population (2021-12-01): 6,494
  - Density: 120.1/km^{2} (311.0/sq mi)
- Time zone: UTC+02:00 (EET)
  - Summer (DST): UTC+03:00 (EEST)
- Postal code: 907295
- Area code: +(40) 241
- Vehicle reg.: CT
- Website: www.primaria-tuzla.ro

Tuzla (Romanian pronunciation: [ˈtuzla]) is a commune in Constanța County, Northern Dobruja, Romania, including the village with the same name. Its name means "saltpan" in Turkish.

The commune is located on the Black Sea shore, between Eforie to the north and Costinești to the south.

== Demographics ==
At the 2011 census, Tuzla had a population of 6,711, including 5,985 Romanians (92.49%), 296 Tatars (4.57%), 175 Turks (2.70%), 4 Hungarians (0.06%), 3 Aromanians (0.05%), and 8 others (0.12%). At the 2021 census, the commune had a population of 6,494; of those, 81.55% were Romanians, 3.54% Tatars, and 2.53% Turks.
