= Costinești =

- Commune
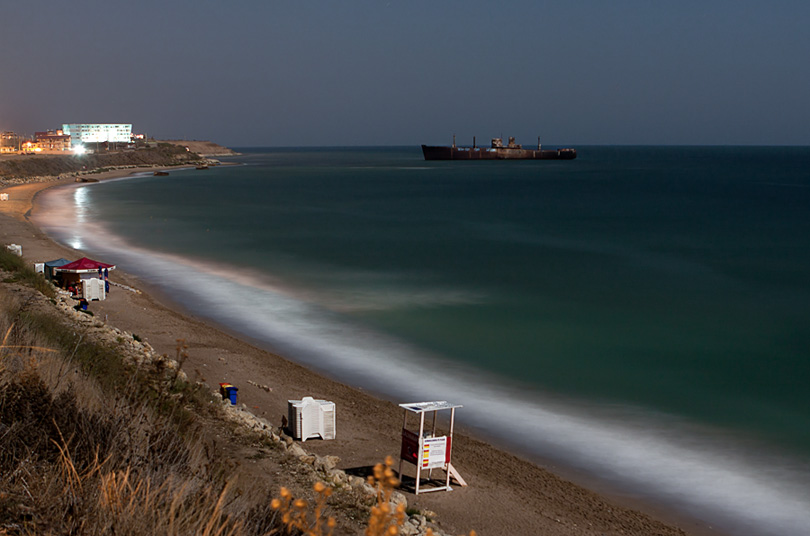

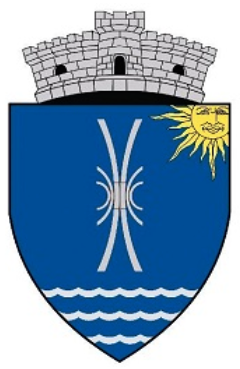
- Coat of arms

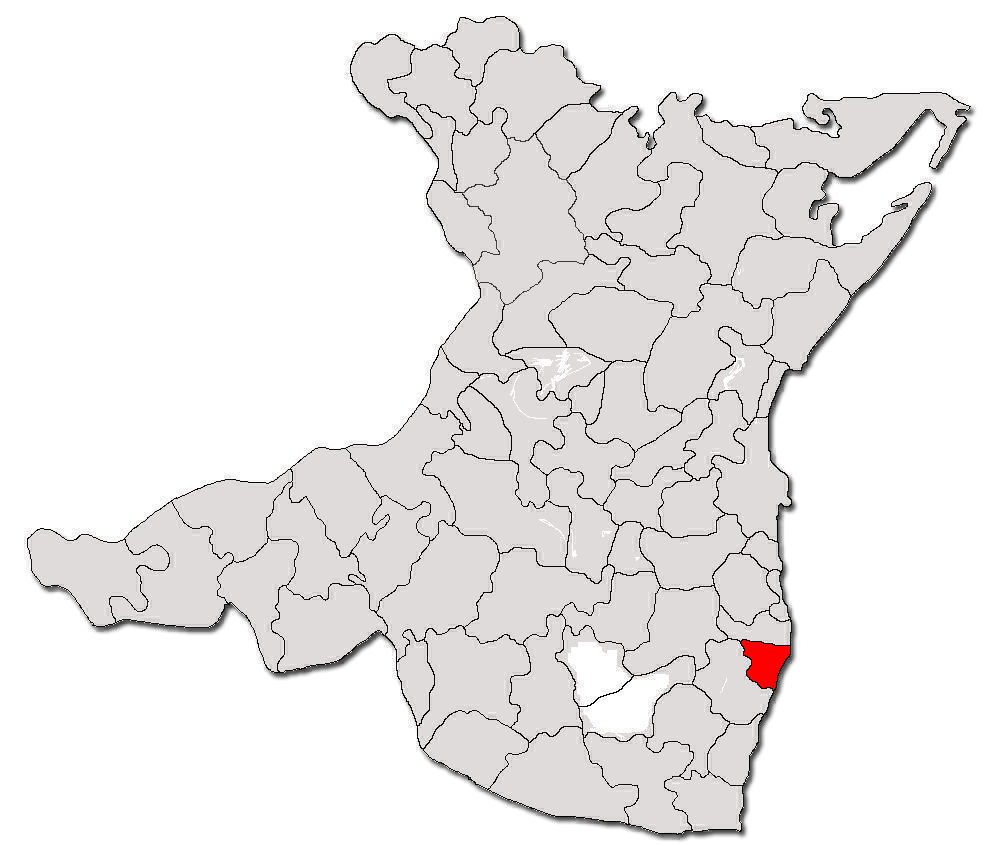
- Location in Constanța County

- Location in Romania
- Coordinates: 43°57′N 28°38′E
- Country: Romania
- County: Constanța
- Subdivisions: Costinești, Schitu

Government
  - Mayor (2020–2024): Dumitru Jeanu (PMP)
- Area: 20.28 km^{2} (7.83 sq mi)
- Population (2021-12-01): 3,121
  - Density: 153.9/km^{2} (398.6/sq mi)
- Time zone: UTC+02:00 (EET)
  - Summer (DST): UTC+03:00 (EEST)
- Postal code: 907090
- Area code: +(40) 241
- Vehicle reg.: CT
- Website: www.primariacostinesti.ro

Costinești (Romanian pronunciation: [kostiˈneʃtʲ]) is a commune and resort in Constanța County, Northern Dobruja, Romania, located on the shore of the Black Sea, about 30 kilometres (19 mi) south of the county seat, Constanța. It consists of two villages: Costinești and Schitu.

== General information ==
During the summer season, the commune of Costinești becomes known as Costinești Resort, also referred to as the Youth Resort due to its nightlife and outdoor entertainment.

Due to its eastward orientation, the beach receives sunlight for 10–12 hours per day. The resort has an accommodation capacity of 150,000 places.

For tourists interested in diving, speleological dives can be made at Peștera Rapanelor and at formations carved into subaquatic Sarmatian limestone. A wide variety of nautical recreational facilities are also available. Costinești Resort also hosts student and youth camps as well as yoga practitioners.

== Etymology ==
Costinești was previously called Mangeapunar until 1840 and subsequently Büffelbrunnen until 1940. In 1940 it was renamed to Costinești after Emil Costinescu, a former land owner and Minister of Finance. Between 1950 and 1960 it briefly held the name Dezrobirea.

== Background and tourism ==
In the 1960s, it evolved from a small fishing village to a summer destination, most popular with young people and students. A hotel and several villa complexes were built in the Communist era, and featured varying degrees of style and comfort. Since the Romanian Revolution of 1989, some of them have been modernized, and private construction, especially to the north of the resort, has taken off.

The resort also has a small inland lake, around which there are several lodges.

Lying off one of the northern beaches is the shipwreck of the Greek cargo ship E Evangelia (originally the UK refrigerated cargo ship Empire Strength). She was beached there in 1968 and is quite popular with tourists.

Nightlife is centered mainly around the two discos (Ring and Tineretului), in which, during the summer months, concerts are held nightly by the most popular bands from across Romania. Because Costinești is mostly frequented by youngsters, the atmosphere tends to be livelier than in the other Black Sea resorts.

== Tourism and entertainment ==
Costinești has become an important location for large-scale music festivals and entertainment projects on the Romanian Black Sea coast. Among the most prominent events held in the resort is the annual Beach, Please! Festival, a music festival founded in 2022 and focused primarily on hip-hop, trap and urban music. The festival attracts performers and visitors from Romania and abroad and has developed into one of the largest music events in the country.

In 2025, the festival was held from 9 to 13 July and attracted an estimated 500,000 visits over five days, according to figures released by its organisers. Its 2026 edition took place from 8 to 12 July.

Another major entertainment development in the area is NIBIRU, a seasonal entertainment and leisure resort developed between Costinești and Tuzla. Announced in July 2025, the project was developed by Andrei Șelaru (known as Selly), Global Records and a group of investors. The development covers more than 20 hectares and represents an investment of approximately €50 million, according to reporting by Ziarul Financiar.

NIBIRU officially opened on 16 July 2026. The complex brings together live entertainment, concerts, nightlife, restaurants, retail, sports and family-oriented leisure activities. Its first operating season ran until 30 August 2026, establishing a new seasonal entertainment destination in the Costinești area.

The development of NIBIRU is closely connected to the growth of the Beach, Please! festival, which takes place in the same coastal area. Both projects have contributed to the expansion of large-scale entertainment and tourism activities around Costinești.

== Transport ==
Costinești is accessible by either rail or road. There are two CFR railway stations within the resort (South Costinești–Tabără and North Costinești), and the town is connected to the main E87 road which runs north to Constanța and south to the Bulgarian border.

== Demographics ==
Historical population
Year	Pop.	±%
2002	2,530	—
2011	2,866	+13.3%
2021	3,121	+8.9%
Source: Census data

At the 2011 census, Costinești had a population of 2,866; of those, 98.65% were Romanians, 0.47% Roma, 0.29% Turks, 0.11% Hungarians, and 0.47% others. At the 2021 census, the population had increased to 3,121, of which 85.61% were Romanians and 12.85% were of unknown ethnic origin.

== Beach ==
The beach at Costinești resort stretches for 1 kilometre, with its width varying across different sections. Near the obelisk, the beach is wider but becomes very crowded during summer. In the northern section, towards the shipwreck, the beach is narrower, covered with fine sand and bordered by a low cliff. The beach features beach bars, recreational facilities, sun loungers and umbrellas. During summer, Costinești beach serves as a venue for televised programmes and broadcasts by major national radio stations. As of 2025, the beach is undergoing significant expansion works, with nearly 1 kilometre of new meach opened in the southern part of the resort; upon competition, the total length is expected to reach approximately 2.7 kilometres.

== Notable people ==
- Dragoș Ser (born 1999), rugby player

== Gallery ==
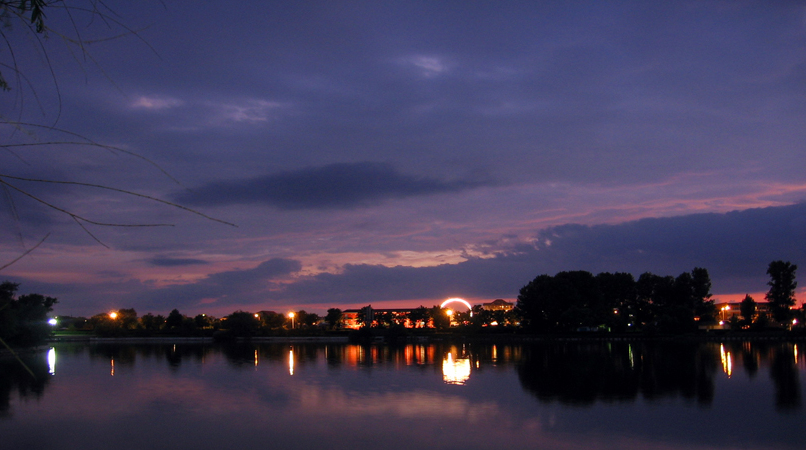
Lake in Costinești

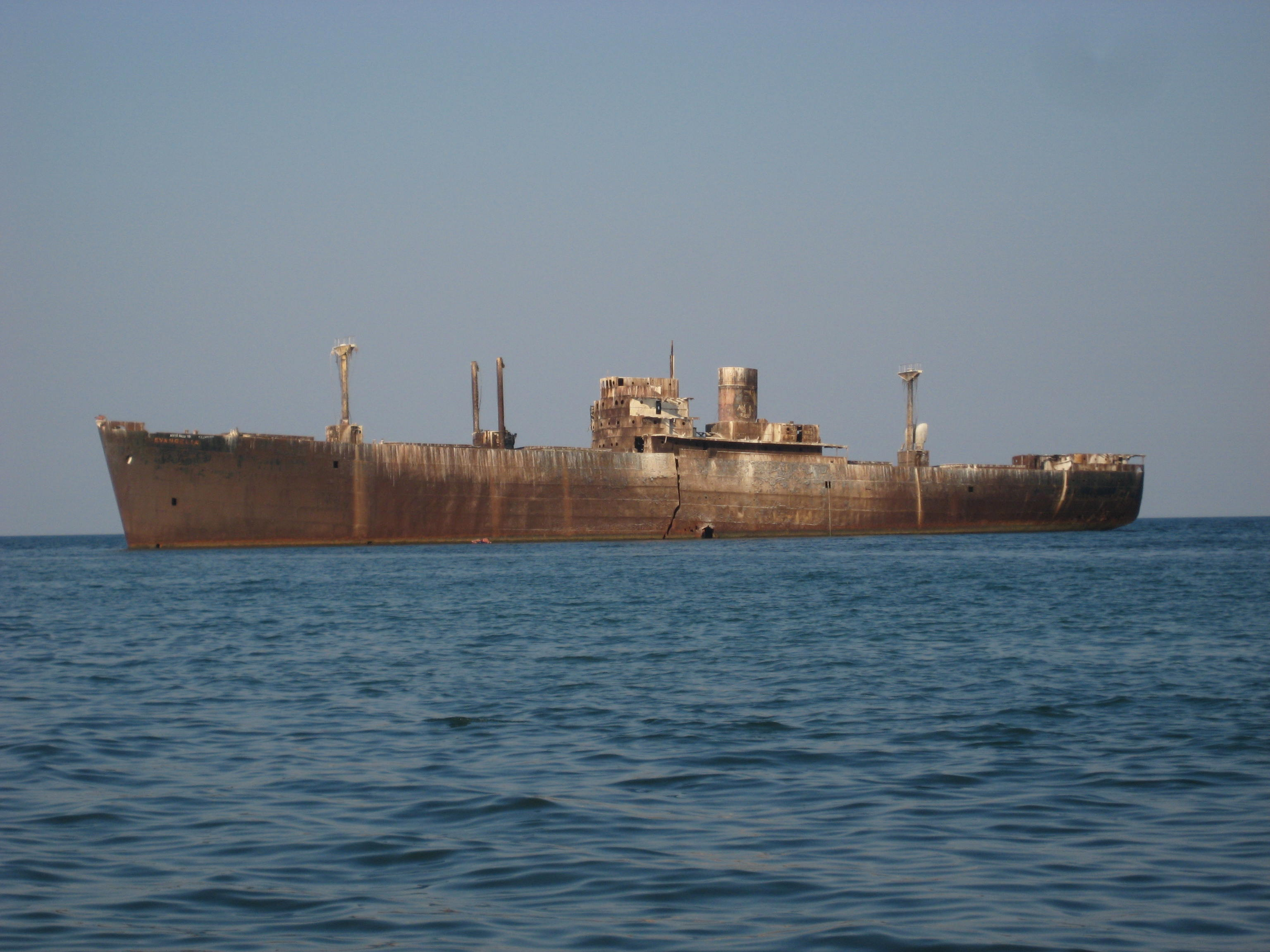
E Evangelia shipwreck

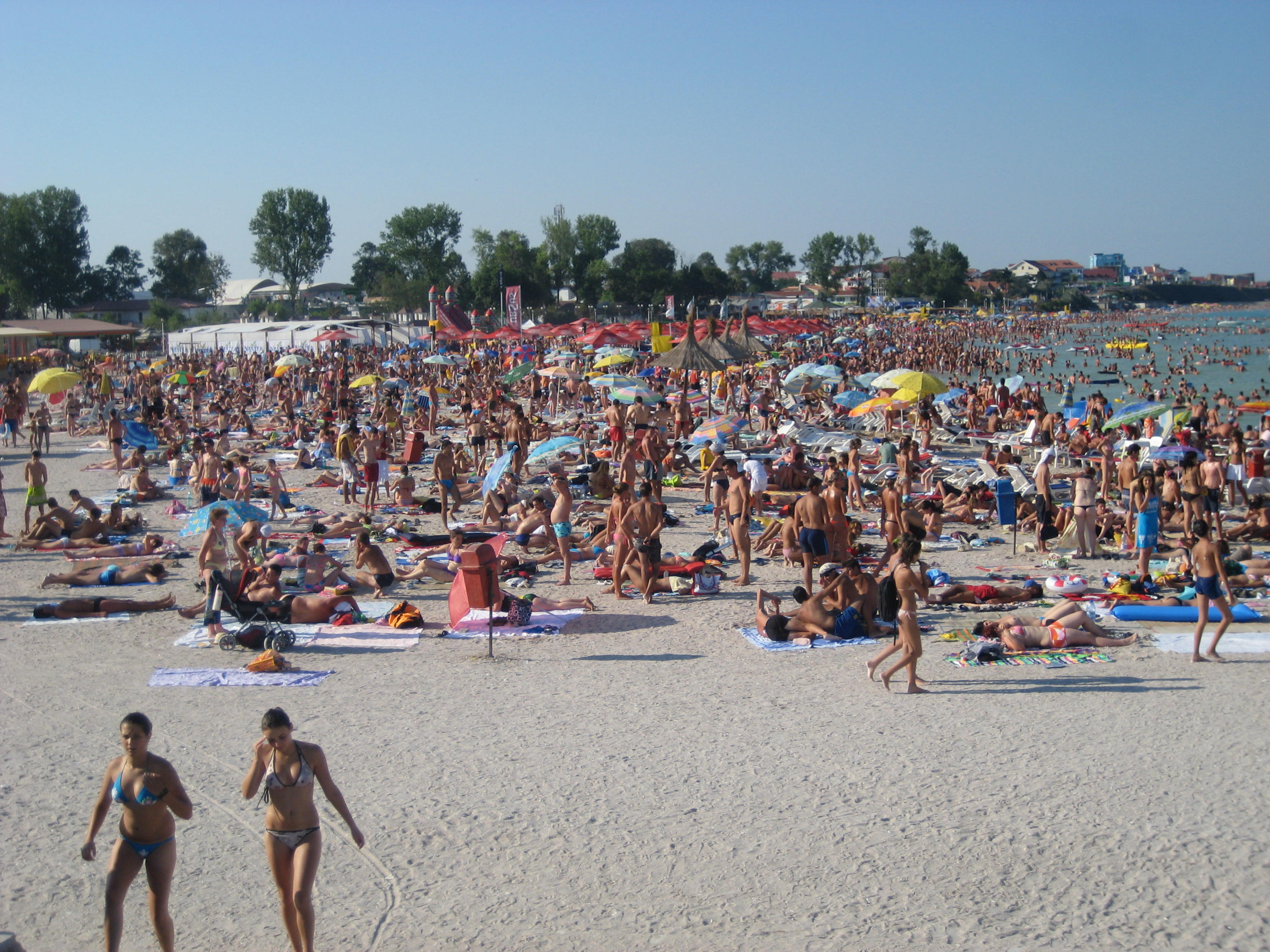
The beach

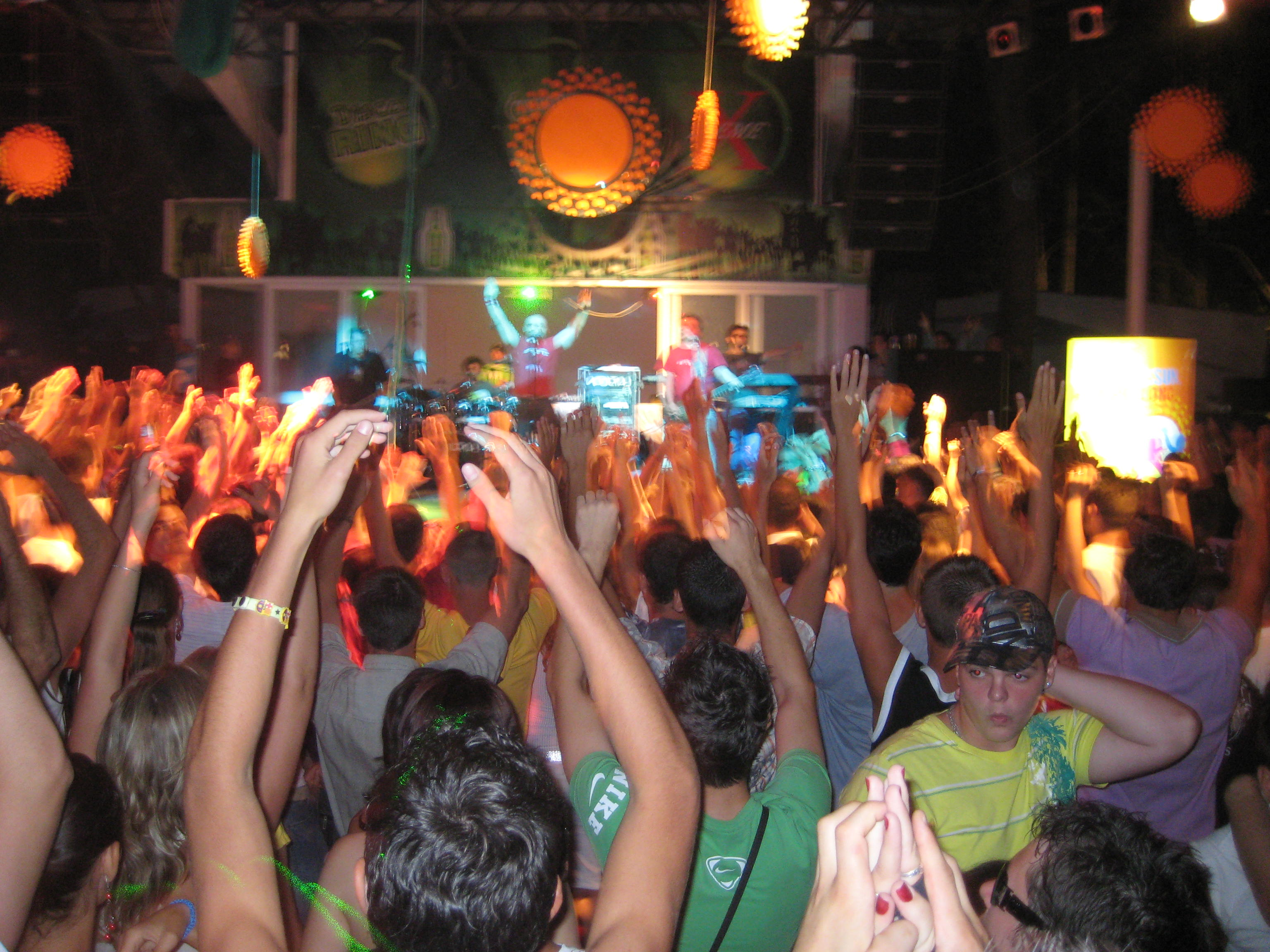
Voltaj concert at Disco Ring

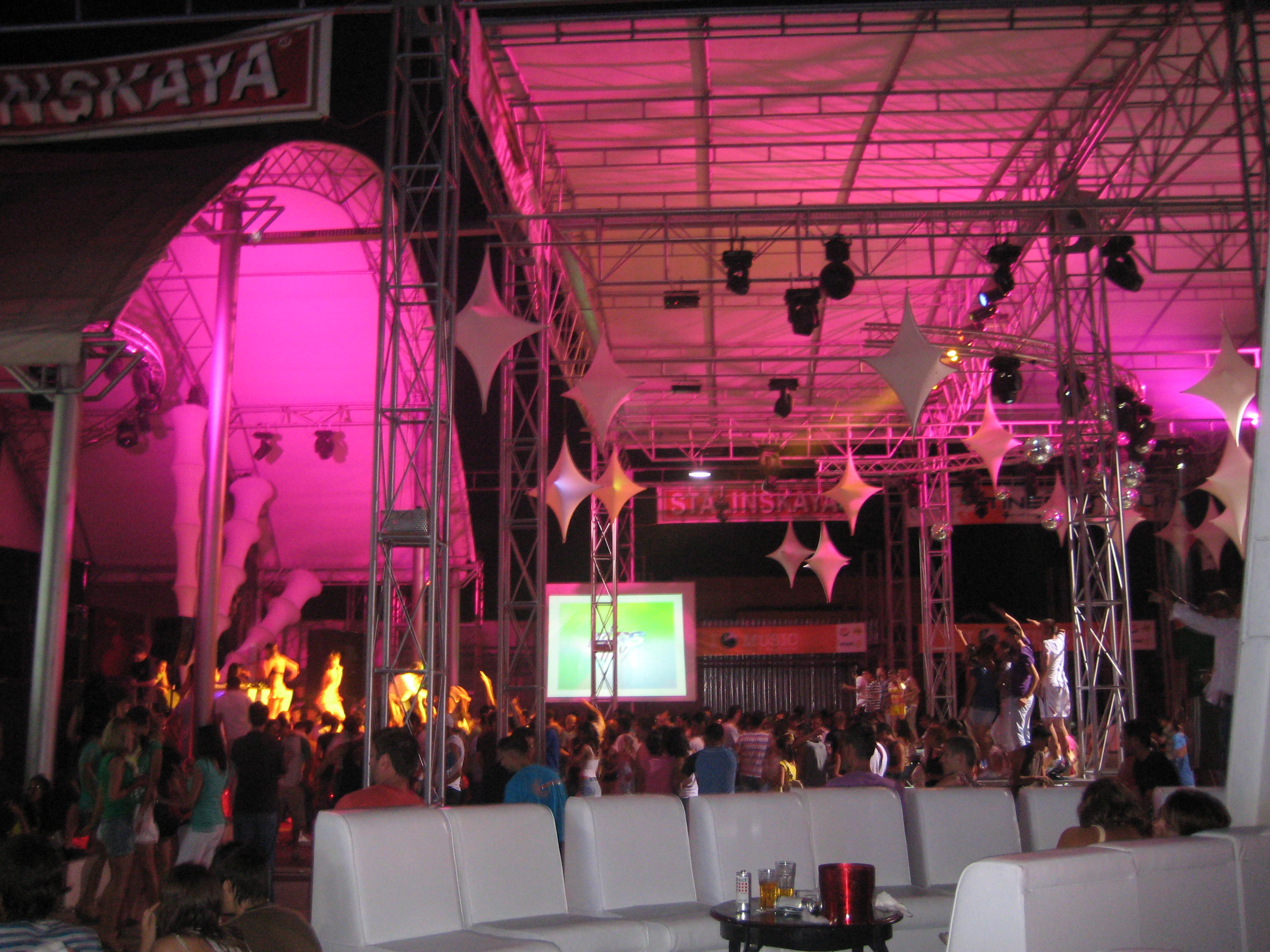
Mega Discoteca Tineretului

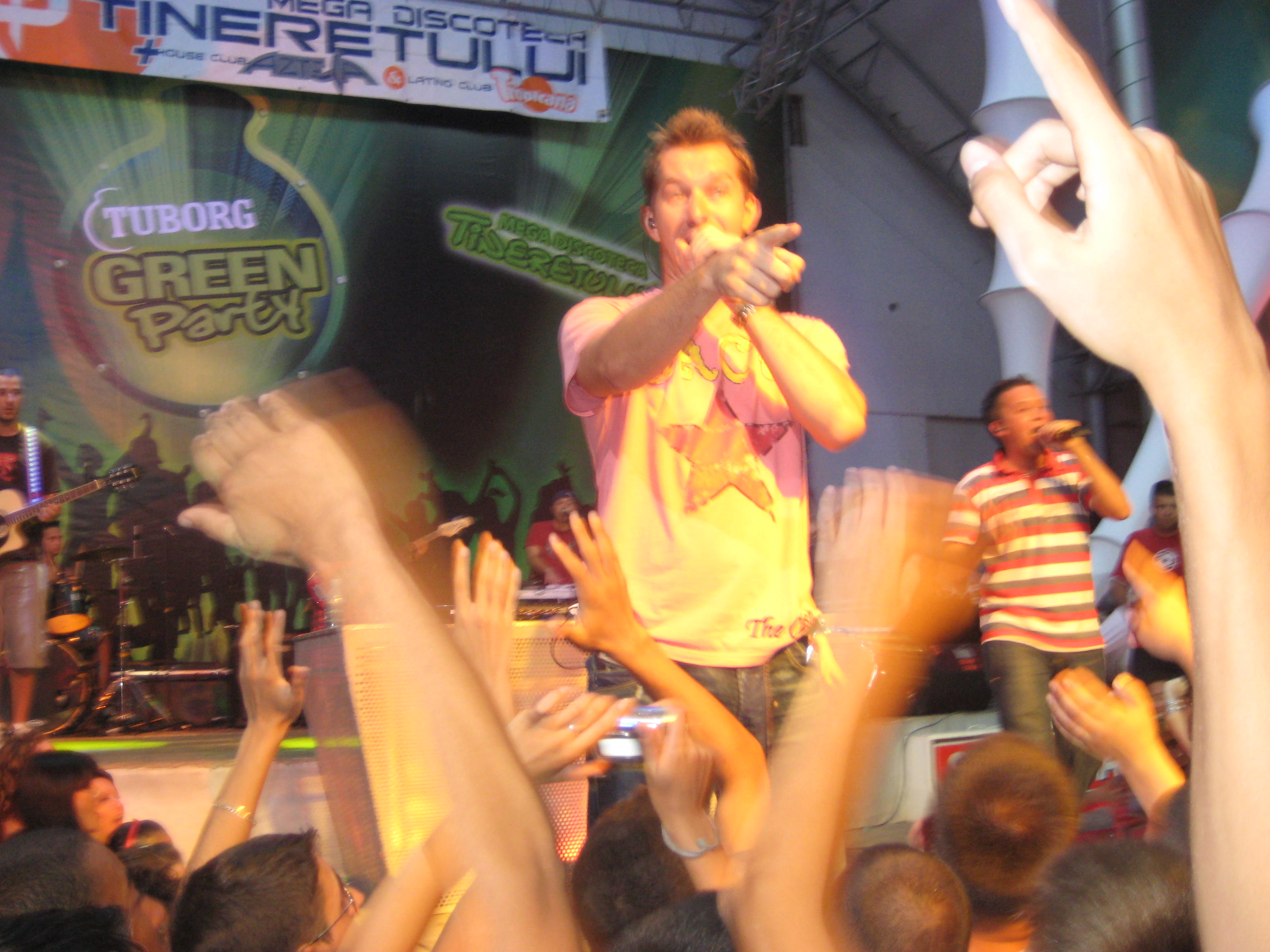
Hi-Q performing at Mega Discoteca Tineretului in Costinești
