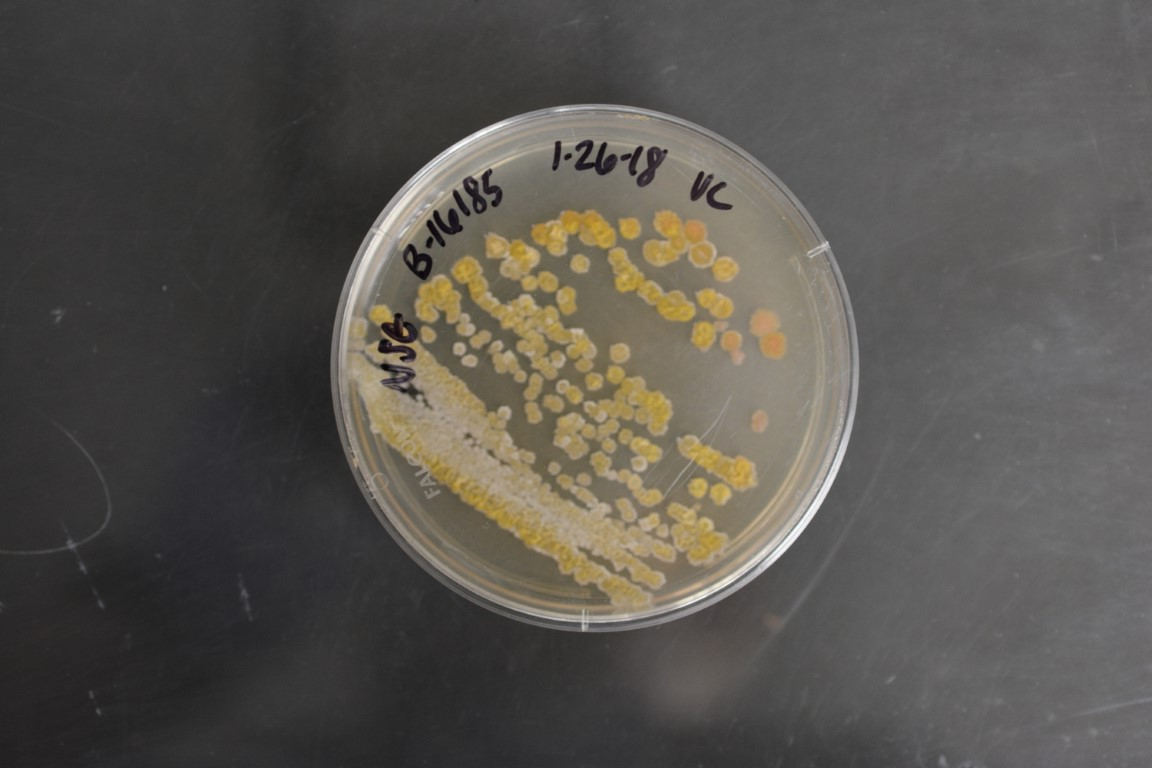
- Kitasatospora setae (type strain)

Scientific classification
- Domain: Bacteria
- Kingdom: Bacillati
- Phylum: Actinomycetota
- Class: Actinomycetes
- Order: Streptomycetales
- Family: Streptomycetaceae
- Genus: Kitasatospora corrig. Ōmura et al. 1983

Type species
- Kitasatospora setae corrig. Ōmura et al. 1983

Species
- See text

Synonyms
- Kitasatosporia (sic)

= Kitasatospora =

Genus of bacteria

Kitasatospora is an Actinobacteria genus in the family Streptomycetaceae. The genus name comes from Shibasaburo Kitasato, a Japanese bacteriologist.

== Phylogeny ==
The currently accepted taxonomy is based on the List of Prokaryotic names with Standing in Nomenclature (LPSN) and National Center for Biotechnology Information (NCBI).

16S rRNA based LTP_10_2024

- Kitasatospora
  - K. arboriphila
  - - K. viridis
    - - - K. acidiphila
        - K. humi
      - - K. kifunensis
        - - - K. nipponensis
            - - K. azatica
              - - K. putterlickiae
                - K. sampliensis Mayilraj et al. 2006
          - - - K. purpeofusca
              - - K. herbaricolor
                - K. indigofera
            - - - K. aburaviensis
                - - - Streptomyces lactacystinicus
                    - - Streptomyces purpureus (Matsumae & Hata 1968) Goodfellow et al. 1986
                      - "K. fumigata" (Frommer 1959) Labeda et al. 2017
                  - - K. xanthocidica
                    - - K. aureofaciens
                      - K. psammotica
              - - - K. cystarginea
                  - - K. atroaurantiaca
                    - - K. gansuensis
                      - - K. kazusensis
                        - K. mediocidica
                - - - K. paranensis
                    - K. terrestris
                  - - K. saccharophila
                    - - - K. cheerisanensis
                        - K. fiedleri
                      - - K. phosalacinea
                        - - - K. griseola
                            - K. paracochleata
                          - - K. setae
                            - - K. cineracea
                              - K. niigatensis

120 marker proteins based GTDB 10-RS226

- Kitasatospora
  - - - K. mediocidica corrig. Labeda 1988
      - K. nipponensis Groth et al. 2004
    - - K. kifunensis (Nakagaito et al. 1993) Groth et al. 2003
      - - K. azatica corrig. (Nakagaito et al. 1993) Zhang et al. 1997
        - - Streptomyces tateyamensis Khan et al. 2010
          - - K. viridis Liu et al. 2005
            - - K. acidiphila Kim et al. 2020
              - K. humi Klaysubun et al. 2022 validly published under the ICNP
  - - - - K. herbaricolor (Kawato and Shinobu 1959) Labeda et al. 2017
        - K. indigofera (Shinobu and Kawato 1960) Nouioui et al. 2018
      - - K. aburaviensis (Nishimura et al. 1957) Labeda et al. 2017
        - - - K. purpeofusca (Yamaguchi and Saburi 1955) Labeda et al. 2017
            - K. putterlickiae Groth et al. 2003
          - - "Streptomyces kaniharaensis" Shomura & Niida 1970
            - - "Streptomyces rubellomurinus" Okuhara et al. 1980
              - - - K. aureofaciens (Duggar 1948) Labeda et al. 2017 [incl. K. psammotica (Virgilio & Hengeller 1960) Labeda et al. 2017]
                  - K. cathayae Zheng et al. 2024
                - - - Streptomyces novaecaesareae Waksman & Henrici 1948
                    - K. xanthocidica (Asahi et al. 1966) Nouioui et al. 2018
                  - - "K. brasiliensis" Cunha-Ferreira et al. 2024
                    - Streptomyces lactacystinicus Také et al. 2017
    - - - K. atroaurantiaca (Nakagaito et al. 1993) Li et al. 2009
        - - K. kazusensis corrig. Li et al. 2009
          - - K. albolonga (Tsukiura et al. 1964) Labeda et al. 2017
            - K. gansuensis Groth et al. 2004
      - - K. cystarginea corrig. Kusakabe and Isono 1992
        - - - K. arboriphila Groth et al. 2004
            - K. paranensis Groth et al. 2004
          - - - K. paracochleata corrig. (Nakagaito et al. 1993) Zhang et al. 1997
              - K. terrestris Groth et al. 2004
            - - - K. cheerisanensis Chung et al. 1999
                - K. griseola corrig. Takahashi et al. 1985
              - - K. cineracea Tajima et al. 2001 [incl. K. niigatensis Tajima et al. 2001]
                - - K. phosalacinea corrig. Takahashi et al. 1985
                  - - K. fiedleri Zimmermann et al. 2023
                    - - K. saccharophila Li et al. 2009
                      - K. setae corrig. Ōmura et al. 1983

== Species ==
Species incertae sedis:

- K. grisea corrig. Nakamura et al. 2025
- K. hibisci Xiao et al. 2025
- "K. kepongensis" Rodriguez, Brown & Goodfellow 2005
- "K. melanogena" Shimazu et al. 1984
- K. misakiensis (Nakamura 1961) Labeda et al. 2017
- "K. papulosa" corrig. Nakamura et al. 1989
- "K. pitsanulaokmensis" Tanasupawat & Jongrungruangchok 2005
- "K. recifensis" Stamford et al. 2007

== See also ==
- List of bacterial genera named after personal names
- List of bacterial orders
- List of bacteria genera
