= Fighting Fascism in Europe =

Fighting Fascism in Europe. The World War II Letters of an American Veteran of the Spanish Civil War
- Editors: David E. Cane; Judy Barrett Litoff; David C. Smith
- Author: Lawrence Cane
- Language: English
- Genre: Bibliography; History nonfiction
- Publisher: Fordham University Press
- Publication date: March 2003
- Publication place: United States
- Media type: Print (hardcover)
- Pages: 256
- ISBN: 0-8232-2251-9

Fighting Fascism in Europe. The World War II Letters of an American Veteran of the Spanish Civil War is a World War II biography book by Lawrence Cane. During World War II, Lawrence Cane wrote more than 300 letters home to his wife while serving in the American Army. In 1995, his son David E. Cane discovered them in a box that had remained in the attic for almost 50 years. Having fought earlier as a member of the International Brigades in the Spanish Civil War on the side of the Spanish Republic against the Nationalist forces of General Francisco Franco, Lawrence Cane enlisted in the U. S. Army as a committed anti-fascist and with extensive combat experience.

Serving first as a white officer of the all black 582nd Engineer Dump Truck Company in the then segregated American Army, Lawrence Cane eventually landed in Normandy in the first assault waves on D-Day, June 6, 1944. Shortly thereafter he was transferred to the 238th Engineer Combat Battalion with which he served at the front for the remainder of the war in Northern Europe. He ultimately won the Silver Star for gallantry in action as well as the French Croix de Guerre.

His letters home were filled with his politically sophisticated observations and eyewitness accounts of some of the most dramatic events in history: segregated military units in an Army that was fighting against racism and oppression, the D-Day landings in Normandy, the liberation of France and Belgium, the Battle of the Bulge, the encounter with the Germans, the early stages of the occupation of Germany, and the horrors of the discovery of the concentration camps. His writings establish the clear link between the Spanish Civil War and World War II. The letters are also filled with his love for his wife, his loneliness at their separation, and his hopes and dreams for their future.

David E. Cane collaborated with two accomplished historians, Prof. Judy Barrett Litoff of Bryant University and Prof. David C. Smith of the University of Maine, to provide detailed annotations and historical background to the letters.
