= Streptacidiphilus griseoplanus =

Scientific classification
- Domain: Bacteria
- Kingdom: Bacillati
- Phylum: Actinomycetota
- Class: Actinomycetes
- Order: Streptomycetales
- Family: Streptomycetaceae
- Genus: Streptacidiphilus
- Species: S. griseoplanus

Binomial name
- Streptacidiphilus griseoplanus (Backus et al. 1957) Nouioui et al. 2019

Type strain
- AA-223, AS 4.1868, ATCC 19766, BCRC 13649, CBS 504.68, CCRC 13649, CGMCC 4.1868, CGMCC 4.1903, CUB 138, DSM 40009, DSM 4009, IFO 12779, ISP 5009, JCM 4300, JCM 4582, KCC S-0300, KCC S-0582, KCCS-0300, KCCS-0582, NBRC 12779, NCIB 9811, NCIMB 9811, NRRL B-3064, NRRL-ISP 5009, RIA 1046, Tresner AA-223, TresnerAA-223, UNIQEM 152, VKM Ac-1727, VTT E-073013

Synonyms
- Streptomyces griseoplanus Backus et al. 1957 (Approved Lists 1980)

Species of bacterium

Streptacidiphilus griseoplanus is a bacterium species from the genus Streptacidiphilus which has been isolated from grassland soil in Iowa in the United States. Streptacidiphilus griseoplanus produces alazopeptin, erythromycin and anticapsin.
