= Streptomyces cyslabdanicus =

Scientific classification
- Domain: Bacteria
- Kingdom: Bacillati
- Phylum: Actinomycetota
- Class: Actinomycetia
- Order: Streptomycetales
- Family: Streptomycetaceae
- Genus: Streptomyces
- Species: S. cyslabdanicus

Binomial name
- Streptomyces cyslabdanicus Také et al. 2015

Type strain
- DSM 42135, NBRC 110081, K04-0144

Species of bacterium

Streptomyces cyslabdanicus is a bacterium species from the genus of Streptomyces which has been isolated from soil from the Ishigaki Island in Japan. Streptomyces cyslabdanicus produces lactacystin and cyslabdan.

== See also ==
- List of Streptomyces species
