= Kitasatospora cinereorecta =

Scientific classification
- Domain: Bacteria
- Kingdom: Bacillati
- Phylum: Actinomycetota
- Class: Actinomycetes
- Order: Streptomycetales
- Family: Streptomycetaceae
- Genus: Kitasatospora
- Species: K. cinereorecta

Binomial name
- Kitasatospora cinereorecta (Terekhova and Preobrazhenskaya 1986) Labeda et al. 2017

Type strain
- AS 4.1622, ATCC 43679, CGMCC 4.1622, DSM 41469, IFO 15395, INA 5202, JCM 6916, NBRC 15395, NRRL B-16360

Synonyms
- Kitasatospora cochleata corrig. (Nakagaito et al. 1993) Zhang et al. 1997; Kitasatosporia cochleata (Nakagaito et al. 1993) Zhang et al. 1997; Streptomyces cinereorectus Terekhova and Preobrazhenskaya 1986; Streptomyces cochleatus Nakagaito et al. 1993

Species of bacterium

Kitasatospora cinereorecta is a bacterium species from the genus Kitasatospora.
