= Embleya scabrispora =

Scientific classification
- Domain: Bacteria
- Kingdom: Bacillati
- Phylum: Actinomycetota
- Class: Actinomycetes
- Order: Streptomycetales
- Family: Streptomycetaceae
- Genus: Embleya
- Species: E. scabrispora

Binomial name
- Embleya scabrispora (Ping et al. 2004) Nouioui et al. 2018

Type strain
- CIP 108319, DSM 41855, JCM 11712, KM-4927, NBRC 100760, NBRC 100780, NRRL B-24202

Synonyms
- Streptomyces scabrisporus Ping et al. 2004

Species of bacterium

Embleya scabrispora is a bacterium species from the genus Embleya which has been isolated from soil from Japan. Embleya scabrispora produces the antibiotic hitachimycin.
