= Kitasatospora aureofaciens =

Scientific classification
- Domain: Bacteria
- Kingdom: Bacillati
- Phylum: Actinomycetota
- Class: Actinomycetes
- Order: Streptomycetales
- Family: Streptomycetaceae
- Genus: Kitasatospora
- Species: K. aureofaciens

Binomial name
- Kitasatospora aureofaciens (Duggar 1948) Labeda et al. 2017

Synonyms
- Kitasatospora psammotica (Virgilio and Hengeller 1960) Labeda et al. 2017; Streptomyces aureofaciens Duggar 1948 (Approved Lists 1980); Streptomyces avellaneus Baldacci and Grein 1966 (Approved Lists 1980); Streptomyces psammoticus Virgilio and Hengeller 1960 (Approved Lists 1980)

Species of bacterium

Kitasatospora aureofaciens is a species of Kitasatospora, and the source of many tetracycline antibiotics. The organism was first isolated at Sanborn Field on the University of Missouri campus in Columbia, Missouri, US; the site became a National Historic Landmark.
