= Kitasatospora misakiensis =

Scientific classification
- Domain: Bacteria
- Kingdom: Bacillati
- Phylum: Actinomycetota
- Class: Actinomycetes
- Order: Streptomycetales
- Family: Streptomycetaceae
- Genus: Kitasatospora
- Species: K. misakiensis

Binomial name
- Kitasatospora misakiensis (Nakamura 1961) Labeda et al. 2017

Type strain
- 1755, 278.65, 922.68, AS 4.1437, ATCC 23938, BCRC 13799, CBS 278.65, CBS 922.68, CCRC 13799, CGMCC 4.1437, DSM 40222, ETH 28373, IFM 1195, IFO 12891, IPCR 7617, ISP 5222, JCM 4062, JCM 4653, KCC S-0062, KCC S-0653, KCCS- 0653, KCCS-0062, KCTC 19951, Lanoot R-8735, LMG 19369, NBRC 12891, NCIB 9852, NCIMB 9852, NRRL B-2923, NRRL-ISP 5222, R-8735, RIA 1166, Suzuki7617, VKM Ac-625

Synonyms
- Streptomyces misakiensis Nakamura 1961 (Approved Lists 1980)

Species of bacterium

Kitasatospora misakiensis is a bacterium species from the genus of Kitasatospora which has been isolated from soil in Japan. Kitasatospora misakiensis produces tubermycin A, tubermycin B, misakimycin and the endothelin receptor antagonist BE-18257B.
