= Yinghuangia seranimata =

Scientific classification
- Domain: Bacteria
- Kingdom: Bacillati
- Phylum: Actinomycetota
- Class: Actinomycetes
- Order: Streptomycetales
- Family: Streptomycetaceae
- Genus: Yinghuangia
- Species: Y. seranimata

Binomial name
- Yinghuangia seranimata (Wang et al. 2012) Komaki and Tamura 2019

Type strain
- CCTCC AA 206006, DSM 41883, YIM 45720

Synonyms
- Streptomyces seranimatus corrig. Wang et al. 2012; Streptomyces serianimatus Wang et al. 2012

Species of bacterium

Yinghuangia seranimata is a bacterium species from the genus Yinghuangia which has been isolated from soil from the tree Cephalotaxus fortunei in Xishuangbanna in the Yunnan Province in China.
