= Kitasatospora aburaviensis =

Scientific classification
- Domain: Bacteria
- Kingdom: Bacillati
- Phylum: Actinomycetota
- Class: Actinomycetes
- Order: Streptomycetales
- Family: Streptomycetaceae
- Genus: Kitasatospora
- Species: K. aburaviensis

Binomial name
- Kitasatospora aburaviensis (Nishimura et al. 1957) Labeda et al. 2017

Type strain
- AS 4.1469, ATCC 23869, BCRC 11617, CBS 280.60, CBS 608.68, CCRC 11617, CECT 3315, CGMCC 4.1469, DSMZ 40033, ETH 24160, ETH 28534, IFM 1083, IFO 12830, IMET 43031, IMET 43081, IMSNU 20129, IMSNU 21005, ISM 1083, ISP 5033, JCM 4170, JCM 4613, KACC 20033, KCC S-0170, KCC S-0613, KCTC 9663, Lanoot R-8665, LMG 19305, NBRC 12830, Nishimura S-66, NRRL B-2218, NRRL-ISP 5033, R-8665, RIA 1107, RIA 732, RIA 891, VKM Ac-1868

Synonyms
- Streptomyces aburaviensis Nishimura et al. 1957 (Approved Lists 1980)

Species of bacterium

Kitasatospora aburaviensis is a bacterium species from the genus Kitasatospora which was isolated from soil from Aburabi from the Shiga Prefecture in Japan. Kitasatospora aburaviensis produces the antibiotics aburamycin and ablastmycin and the enzyme inhibitor ebelactone.
