= Kitasatospora indigofera =

Scientific classification
- Domain: Bacteria
- Kingdom: Bacillati
- Phylum: Actinomycetota
- Class: Actinomycetes
- Order: Streptomycetales
- Family: Streptomycetaceae
- Genus: Kitasatospora
- Species: K. indigofera

Binomial name
- Kitasatospora indigofera (Shinobu and Kawato 1960) Nouioui et al. 2018

Type strain
- AS 4.1848, AS 4.1888, ATCC 23924, BCRC 13773, CBS 908.68, CCRC 13773, CGMCC 4.1848, CGMCC 4.1888, DSM 40124, ETH 28997, IFO 12878, IFO 3868, IMET 42938, ISP 5124, JCM 4646, KCC S-0646, KCCS-0646, NBRC 12878, NBRC 3868, NCIB 9718, NCIMB 9718, NRRL B-3301, NRRL-ISP 5124, OEU 709, RIA 1127, Shinobu 709

Synonyms
- Streptomyces indigoferus Shinobu and Kawato 1960 (Approved Lists 1980)

Species of bacterium

Kitasatospora indigofera is a bacterial species of the genus Kitasatospora.
