= Kitasatospora xanthocidica =

Scientific classification
- Domain: Bacteria
- Kingdom: Bacillati
- Phylum: Actinomycetota
- Class: Actinomycetes
- Order: Streptomycetales
- Family: Streptomycetaceae
- Genus: Kitasatospora
- Species: K. xanthocidica

Binomial name
- Kitasatospora xanthocidica (Asahi et al. 1966) Nouioui et al. 2018

Type strain
- AS 4.1424, ATCC 27480, BCRC 11874, CBS 770.72, CCRC 11874, CGMCC 4.1424, DSM 40575, IFO 13469, IPCR 51-4, ISP 5575, JCM 4243, JCM 4862, KCC S-0243, KCC S-0862, KCTC 19978, Lanoot R-8736, LMG 19370, NBRC 13469, NRRL B-12504, NRRL-ISP 5575, R-8736, RIA 143 D, RIA 1430, Suzuki 51-4, VKM Ac-872

Synonyms
- Streptomyces xanthocidicus Asahi et al. 1966 (Approved Lists 1980)

Species of bacterium

Kitasatospora xanthocidica is a bacterium species from the genus Kitasatospora. Kitasatospora xanthocidica produces xanthocidin, piericidin A, glucopiericidin A and resipinomycins.

== See also ==
- List of Streptomyces species
