= Yinghuangia aomiensis =

Scientific classification
- Domain: Bacteria
- Kingdom: Bacillati
- Phylum: Actinomycetota
- Class: Actinomycetes
- Order: Streptomycetales
- Family: Streptomycetaceae
- Genus: Yinghuangia
- Species: Y. aomiensis

Binomial name
- Yinghuangia aomiensis (Nagai et al. 2011) Nouioui et al. 2018

Type strain
- JCM 17986, KACC 14925, M24DS04, M24DS4, NBRC 106164

Synonyms
- Streptomyces aomiensis Nagai et al. 2011

Species of bacterium

Yinghuangia aomiensis is a Gram-positive, aerobic bacterium species from the genus Yinghuangia which was isolated from soil from Aomi in Tokyo in Japan.

== See also ==
- List of Streptomyces species
