= Streptomyces lactacystinicus =

Scientific classification
- Domain: Bacteria
- Kingdom: Bacillati
- Phylum: Actinomycetota
- Class: Actinomycetia
- Order: Streptomycetales
- Family: Streptomycetaceae
- Genus: Streptomyces
- Species: S. lactacystinicus

Binomial name
- Streptomyces lactacystinicus Také et al. 2017

Type strain
- DSM 42136, NBRC 110082, OM-6519

Species of bacterium

Streptomyces lactacystinicus is a bacterium species from the genus of Streptomyces which has been isolated from soil near a near lake from Inba in Japan. Streptomyces lactacystinicus produces lactacystin and cyslabdan.

== See also ==
- List of Streptomyces species
