= Aspergillus aculeatinus =

Scientific classification
- Kingdom: Fungi
- Division: Ascomycota
- Class: Eurotiomycetes
- Order: Eurotiales
- Family: Aspergillaceae
- Genus: Aspergillus
- Species: A. aculeatinus

Binomial name
- Aspergillus aculeatinus Noonim, Frisvad, Varga & Samson (2008)

Species of fungus

Aspergillus aculeatinus is a species of fungus in the genus Aspergillus. It belongs to the group of black Aspergilli, which are important industrial workhorses. A. aculeatinus belongs to the Nigri section. The species was first described in 2008 and has been isolated from Thai coffee beans. It has been shown to produce neoxaline, secalonic acid D and F, and aculeacins.

The genome of A. aculeatinus was sequenced and published in 2014 as part of the Aspergillus whole-genome sequencing project – a project dedicated to performing whole-genome sequencing of all members of the genus Aspergillus. The genome assembly size was 36.47 Mbp.

== Growth on agar plates ==
Apsergillus aculeatinus has been cultivated on Czapek yeast extract agar (CYA) plates and Malt Extract Agar Oxoid® (MEAOX) plates. The growth morphology of the colonies can be seen in the pictures below.

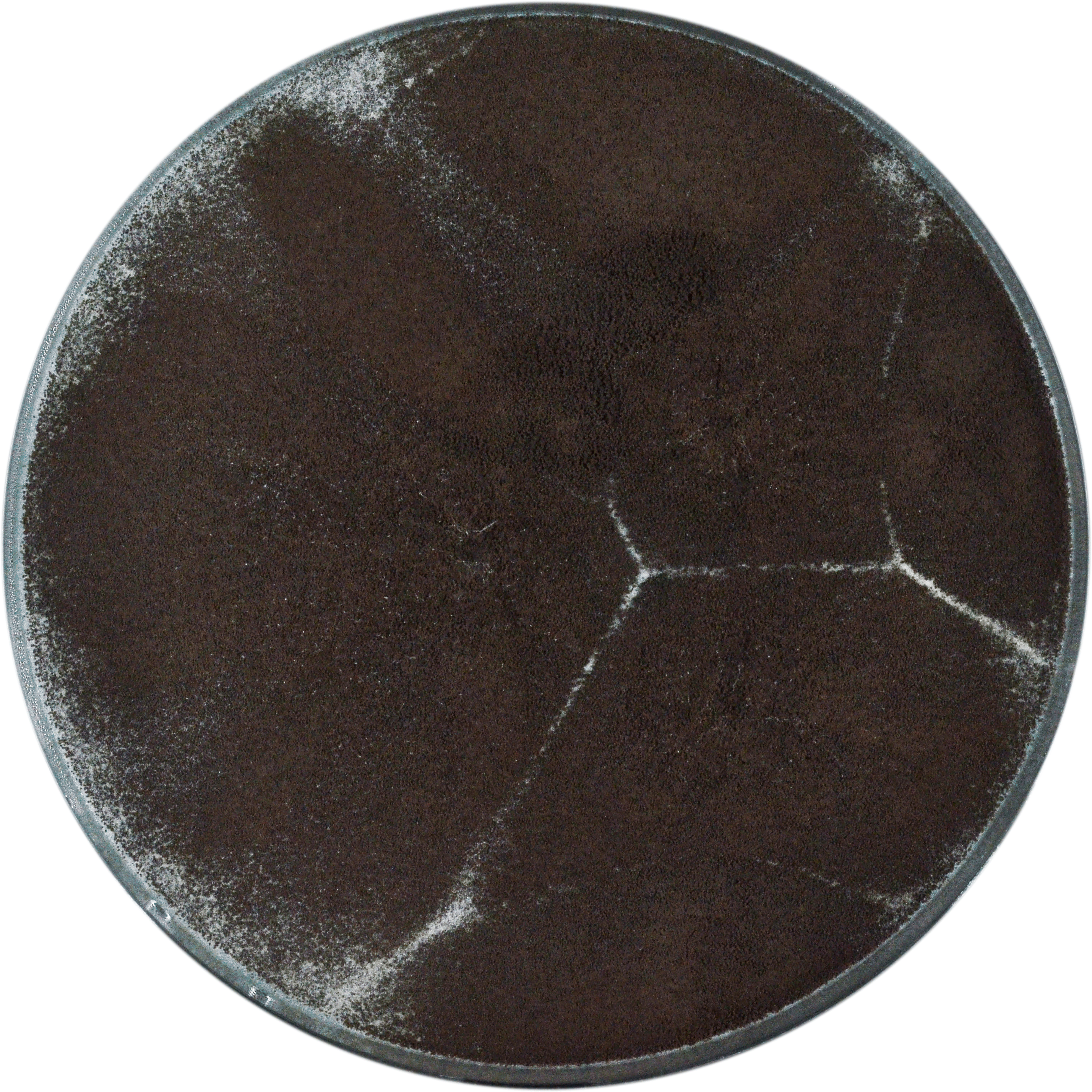
Aspergillus aculeatinus growing on CYA plate

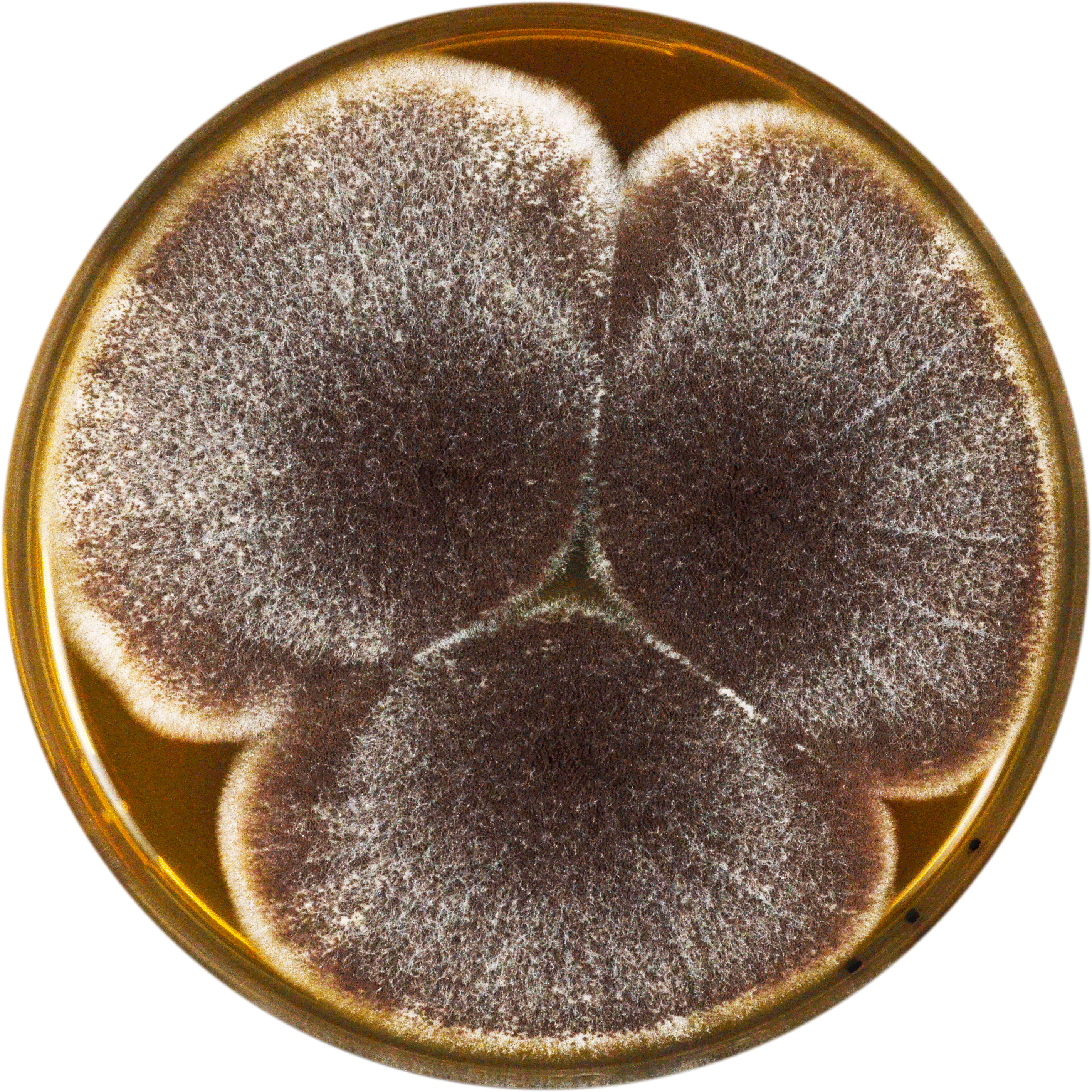
Aspergillus aculeatinus growing on MEAOX plate
