= Kitasatospora herbaricolor =

Scientific classification
- Domain: Bacteria
- Kingdom: Bacillati
- Phylum: Actinomycetota
- Class: Actinomycetes
- Order: Streptomycetales
- Family: Streptomycetaceae
- Genus: Kitasatospora
- Species: K. herbaricolor

Binomial name
- Kitasatospora herbaricolor (Kawato and Shinobu 1959) Labeda et al. 2017

Type strain
- AS 4.1849, AS 4.1887, ATCC 23922, BCRC 13772, CBS 424.61, CBS 906.68, CCRC 13772, CGMCC 4.1849, CGMCC 4.1887, DSM 40123, ETH 28502, ETH 28996, IFO 12876, IFO 3838, IFO 3932, ISP 5123, JCM 4138, JCM 4645, KCC S-0138, KCC S-0645, KCCS-0138, KCCS-0645, NBIMCC 494, NBRC 12876, NBRC 3838, NBRC 3932, NCIB 9837, NCIMB 9837, NRRL B-3299, NRRL-ISP 5123, OEU 608, RIA 1126, RIA 654, Shinobu 608, VKM Ac-793

Synonyms
- Streptomyces herbaricolor Kawato and Shinobu 1959 (Approved Lists 1980)

Species of bacterium

Kitasatospora herbaricolor is a bacterium species from the genus of Kitasatospora which has been isolated from soil.
