= Kitasatospora albolonga =

Scientific classification
- Domain: Bacteria
- Kingdom: Bacillati
- Phylum: Actinomycetota
- Class: Actinomycetes
- Order: Streptomycetales
- Family: Streptomycetaceae
- Genus: Kitasatospora
- Species: K. albolonga

Binomial name
- Kitasatospora albolonga (Tsukiura et al. 1964) Labeda et al. 2017

Type strain
- 304R7, AS 4.1661, ATCC 27414, BCRC 15179, CBS 766.72, CCRC 15179, CGMCC 4.1661, DSM 40570, IFO 13465, ISP 5570, JCM 4716, KCC S-0716, KCCM 12597, KCTC 9676, KCTC 9749, NBRC 13465, NRRL B-3604, NRRL-ISP 5570, RIA 1426, VKM Ac-704

Synonyms
- Streptomyces albolongus Tsukiura et al. 1964 (Approved Lists 1980)

Species of bacterium

Kitasatospora albolonga is a bacterium species from the genus Kitasatospora. Kitasatospora albolonga produces valilactone, ansathiazin, awamycin and griseofulvin.
