= Kitasatospora purpeofusca =

Scientific classification
- Domain: Bacteria
- Kingdom: Bacillati
- Phylum: Actinomycetota
- Class: Actinomycetes
- Order: Streptomycetales
- Family: Streptomycetaceae
- Genus: Kitasatospora
- Species: K. purpeofusca

Binomial name
- Kitasatospora purpeofusca (Yamaguchi and Saburi 1955) Labeda et al. 2017

Type strain
- ATCC 23952, BCRC 12093, CBS 935.68, CCRC 12093, CGMCC 4.1767, CGMCC 4.1999, DSM 40283, ETH 24126, H-5080, IAM 73, IFO 12905, ISP 5283, JCM 4156, JCM 4665, KCC S-0156, KCC S-0509, KCC S-0665, KCCS- 0665, KCCS-0156, KCTC 19967, LMG 20283, NBRC 12905, NCIB 9822, NCIMB 9822, NRRL B-1817, NRRL-ISP 5283, RIA 1197, VKM Ac-1825, Yamaguchi H-5080

Synonyms
- Streptomyces purpeofuscus Yamaguchi and Saburi 1955 (Approved Lists 1980)

Species of bacterium

Kitasatospora purpeofusca is a bacterium species from the genus Kitasatospora which has been isolated from soil in Japan. Kitasatospora purpeofusca produces negamycin, aestivophoenin A, aestivophoenin B, aestivophoenin C and heptaene.
