= David E. Cane =

American biochemist

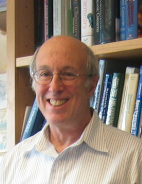
- Born: 22 September 1944 (age 81); New York City
- Education: Harvard University (B. A., 1966) (M. A., 1967) (Ph.D., 1971)
- Known for: Natural product biosynthesis
- Awards: Alfred Bader Award of the American Chemical Society; Repligen Corporation Award in Chemistry of Biological Processes, American Chemical Society; Prelog Medal of the Eidgenössiche Technische Hochschule, Zürich; Kitasato Medal in Microbial Chemistry; Ernest Guenther Award of the American Chemical Society,
- Scientific career
- Fields: Biochemistry; Chemical Biology
- Workplaces: Brown University
- Doctoral advisor: E. J. Corey

David E. Cane (born September 22, 1944) is an American biological chemist. He is Vernon K. Krieble Professor of Chemistry Emeritus and professor of molecular biology, cell biology, and biochemistry emeritus at Brown University in Providence, Rhode Island. He is recognized for his work on the biosynthesis of natural products, particularly terpenoids and polyketides. He was elected as a Fellow of the American Association for the Advancement of Science in 2003 and as a Fellow of the American Academy of Arts and Sciences in 2013.

== Education and career ==
Born in New York City, Cane graduated magna cum laude from Harvard College in 1966. He completed his Ph.D. study in organic synthesis in 1971 under the guidance of Prof. E. J. Corey at Harvard University. He pursued his studies as a National Institutes of Health Postdoctoral Fellow with Prof. Duilio Arigoni at the Eidgenössiche Technische Hochschule (Swiss Federal Institute of Technology) in Zürich, Switzerland. In 1973, he joined the faculty of Brown University, where he became a full professor of chemistry in 1980, chair of the chemistry department from 1983 to 1989, and professor of biochemistry in 1991.

Cane has been a visiting professor at the University of Chicago (1980), the Technion (Israel Institute of Technology), Haifa, Israel (1994–95), the University of California, San Francisco (1998–99), and the Université Louis Pasteur in Strasbourg, France (1999). He has also been a visiting fellow at Christ's College, Cambridge (1989–90), Emmanuel College, Cambridge (2004), as well as a visiting scholar at the Institut Louis Pasteur, Paris (2005) and the University of Chicago (2010–2011). In 2011 he was named an honorary professor of Wuhan University.

Cane has been associate editor of the Journal of Organic Chemistry (1995–2003) and at various times has served on the editorial boards of Bioorganic Chemistry, the Journal of Antibiotics, Chemical Reviews, Topics in Stereochemistry, Current Opinion in Chemical Biology, and the Wiley Encyclopedia of Chemical Biology.

== Research ==
Cane's research interests have been the elucidation of the chemistry, mechanistic enzymology, and molecular genetics of two main biosynthetic transformations, including terpenoid metabolism and polyketide antibiotic biosynthesis. The Cane laboratory has focused on characterization of the component genes of microbial terpenoid biosynthetic gene clusters using a combination of genetic, biochemical, and chemical approaches. In this work, he has collaborated with Prof. David W. Christianson at the University of Pennsylvania and Prof. Haruo Ikeda of the Kitasato Institute of Life Sciences in Tokyo. For his work on polyketide antibiotics, Cane has had a long-time collaboration with Prof. Chaitan Khosla of Stanford University, with additional collaborations with Prof. Adrian Keatinge-Clay of the University of Texas at Austin and Prof. Zixin Deng of Shanghai Jiao Tong University in China. They have been concentrated on determination of the biochemical basis for the complex stereochemical control of polyketide natural products.

== Awards and honors ==
Cane has received many awards and honors, including the following:

- Fellow of the American Academy of Arts and Sciences, 2013
- Alfred Bader Award of the American Chemical Society, 2013
- Philip J. Bray Award for Teaching Excellence in the Physical Sciences, Brown University, 2008
- Repligen Corporation Award in Chemistry of Biological Processes, American Chemical Society, Division of Biological Chemistry, 2005
- Fellow of the American Association for the Advancement of Science, 2003
- Prelog Medal of the Eidgenössiche Technische Hochschule, Zürich, 2002
- Arthur C. Cope Scholar Award of the American Chemical Society, 2000
- Fogarty International Center Senior International Fellow, 1999 and 1989
- Kitasato Medal in Microbial Chemistry, 1995
- National Institutes of Health MERIT Award, 1994–2004
- Simonsen Lecture, Royal Society of Chemistry, 1990–91
- Fulbright Commission Grant-in Aid, 1990
- John Simon Guggenheim Memorial Foundation Fellow, 1990
- Ernest Guenther Award of the American Chemical Society, 1985
- Japan Society for the Promotion of Science Fellow, 1983
- Alfred P. Sloan Fellow, 1978–1982

== Notable publications ==
Cane has published over 330 research papers and 10 book chapters. He has also been editor of 2 books, including a collection of World War II letters.

- Comprehensive Natural Products Chemistry, volume 2: Isoprenoids Including Carotenoids and Steroids, David E. Cane, volume editor. Elsevier, 1999. ISBN 0-08-043154-2 (0-08-043154-2)
- Fighting Fascism in Europe. The World War II Letters of an American Veteran of the Spanish Civil War, by Lawrence Cane. Edited by David E. Cane, Judy Barrett Litoff, and David C. Smith. Fordham University Press, New York, 2003. ISBN 0-8232-2251-9 (0-8232-2251-9)

=== Fighting Fascism in Europe. The World War II Letters of an American Veteran of the Spanish Civil War ===
David Cane's father, Lawrence Cane, wrote more than 300 letters home while serving in the American Army during World War II. In 1995 David discovered them in a box that had remained in the attic for almost 50 years. The letters are filled with Lawrence Cane's politically sophisticated observations and eyewitness accounts of some of the most dramatic events in history: segregated military units in an Army that was fighting against racism and oppression, the D-Day landings in Normandy, the liberation of France and Belgium, the Battle of the Bulge, the encounter with the Germans, the early stages of the occupation of Germany, and the horrors of the discovery of the concentration camps.

David Cane collaborated with historians Judy Barrett Litoff and David C. Smith to provide detailed annotations and historical background to this collection of letters.
