= Yinghuangia catbensis =

Scientific classification
- Domain: Bacteria
- Kingdom: Bacillati
- Phylum: Actinomycetota
- Class: Actinomycetes
- Order: Streptomycetales
- Family: Streptomycetaceae
- Genus: Yinghuangia
- Species: Y. catbensis

Binomial name
- Yinghuangia catbensis (Sakiyama et al. 2014) Komaki and Tamura 2019

Type strain
- NBRC 107860, VN07A0015, VTCC-A-1889

Synonyms
- Streptomyces catbensis Sakiyama et al. 2014

Species of bacterium

Yinghuangia catbensis is a bacterium species from the genus Yinghuangia which has been isolated from soil from the Cat Ba Island in Vietnam.
