= Nargenicin =

Chemical compound

Clinical data
- ATC code: none

Pharmacokinetic data
- Excretion: ~

Identifiers
- CAS Number: 70695-02-2
- PubChem CID: 6436286
- ChemSpider: 4885360
- UNII: XP2QP458K4

Chemical and physical data
- Formula: C_{28}H_{37}NO_{8}
- Molar mass: 515.603 g·mol^{−1}
- SMILES: O=C2O[C@H]([C@H](O)C)[C@@H](\C=C(/C)[C@]51O[C@H]4[C@H](\C=C/[C@@H]1C[C@@H]2OC)[C@H]5[C@H](O)[C@H]([C@H]4OC(=O)c3ccc[nH]3)C)C
- InChI: InChI=1S/C28H37NO8/c1-13-11-14(2)28-17(12-20(34-5)27(33)35-23(13)16(4)30)8-9-18-21(28)22(31)15(3)24(25(18)37-28)36-26(32)19-7-6-10-29-19/h6-11,13,15-18,20-25,29-31H,12H2,1-5H3/b14-11+/t13-,15-,16-,17-,18-,20+,21+,22-,23+,24-,25+,28-/m1/s1; Key:YEUSSARNQQYBKH-KFIBIINQSA-N

Nargenicin (CP-47,444, CS-682) is a 28 carbon macrolide with a fused tricyclic core that has in addition a unique ether bridge. The polyketide antibiotic was isolated from Nocardia argentinensis. Nargenicin is effective towards gram-positive bacteria and been shown to have strong antibacterial activity against Staphylococcus aureus, including strains that are resistant to methicillin. It has also been shown to induce cell differentiation and inhibit cell proliferation in a human myeloid leukemia cell line.

== Biosynthesis ==
The biosynthesis of nargenicin is believed to be closely related to fatty acid biosynthesis to produce a polyketide chain. David E. Cane and colleagues have used feeding experiments to determine that nargenicin is derived from common precursors acetate and propionate.

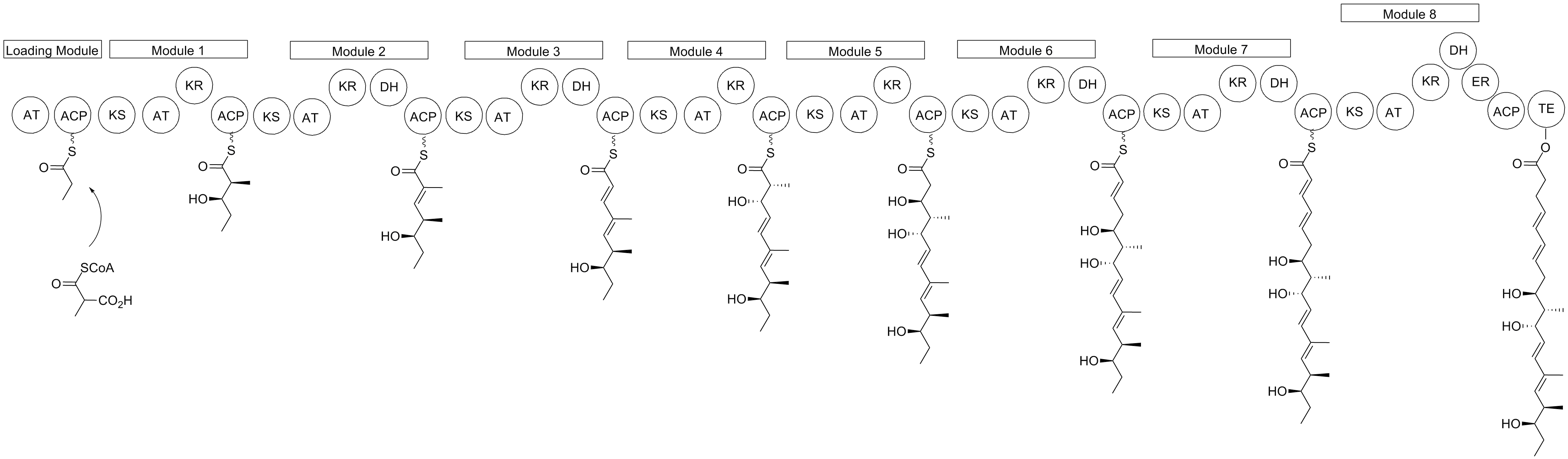
Proposed Biosynthesis of Nargenicin.

The polyketide chain produced then undergoes a ring closure to form the large lactone ring and a Diels–Alder reaction to form the fused cyclohexane/cyclohexene rings. The oxygen atoms attached to carbons in positions that do not correspond to polyketides—carbons 8 and 13 (the ether bridge), carbon 2 (the methoxy substituent), and carbon 18 (on the hydroxyethyl chain attached to the lactone ring) are derived from molecular oxygen.

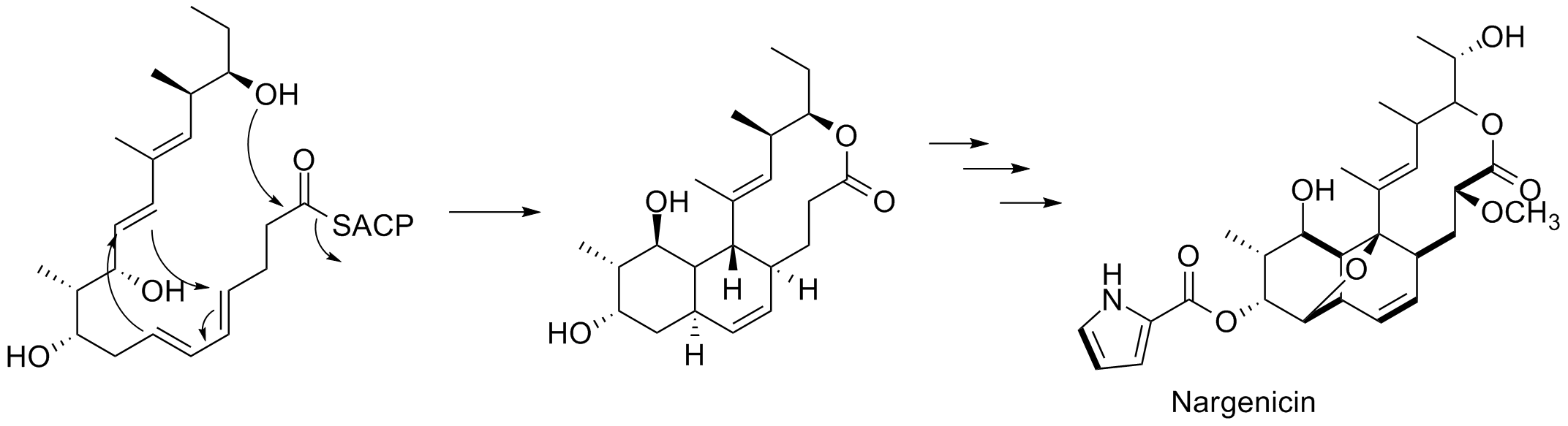
Last steps of the biosynthesis of Nargenicin.
