= Streptomyces vitaminophilus =

Scientific classification
- Domain: Bacteria
- Kingdom: Bacillati
- Phylum: Actinomycetota
- Class: Actinomycetes
- Order: Streptomycetales
- Family: Streptomycetaceae
- Genus: Streptomyces
- Species: S. vitaminophilus

Binomial name
- Streptomyces vitaminophilus Goodfellow et al. 1986

Type strain
- ATCC 31673, DSM 41686, FERM P-5702, FERM-P 5072, IFO 14294, JCM 6054, NBRC 14294, NRRL B-16933, SF-2080

Synonyms
- Actinosporangium vitaminophilum, Streptomyces vitaminophileus, Actinosporangium vitaminiphilum

Species of bacterium

Streptomyces vitaminophilus is a bacterium species from the genus of Streptomyces which has been isolated from soil in the Nagano City in Japan. Streptomyces vitaminophilus produces the pyrrolomycin complex.

== See also ==
- List of Streptomyces species
