= Herbimycin =

Names
- IUPAC name [(2R,3S,5S,6R,7S,8E,10R,11S,12E,14E)-2,5,6,11-tetramethoxy-3,7,9,15-tetramethyl-16,20,22-trioxo-17-azabicyclo[16.3.1]docosa-8,12,14,18,21-pentaen-10-yl] carbamate

Identifiers
CAS Number	70563-58-5
3D model (JSmol)	Interactive image
ChEMBL	ChEMBL1159659
ChemSpider	10272738
PubChem CID	6436247
UNII	815WDV2HST
CompTox Dashboard (EPA)	DTXSID4042674
- InChI: InChI=1S/C30H42N2O9/c1-16-10-9-11-23(37-5)28(41-30(31)36)18(3)12-17(2)27(40-8)24(38-6)13-19(4)26(39-7)21-14-20(33)15-22(25(21)34)32-29(16)35/h9-12,14-15,17,19,23-24,26-28H,13H2,1-8H3,(H2,31,36)(H,32,35)/b11-9-,16-10+,18-12+/t17-,19-,23-,24-,26+,27+,28-/m0/s1 Key: MCAHMSDENAOJFZ-BVXDHVRPSA-N; InChI=1S/C30H42N2O9/c1-16-10-9-11-23(37-5)28(41-30(31)36)18(3)12-17(2)27(40-8)24(38-6)13-19(4)26(39-7)21-14-20(33)15-22(25(21)34)32-29(16)35/h9-12,14-15,17,19,23-24,26-28H,13H2,1-8H3,(H2,31,36)(H,32,35)/b11-9-,16-10+,18-12+/t17-,19-,23-,24-,26+,27+,28-/m0/s1 Key: MCAHMSDENAOJFZ-BVXDHVRPBC; Key: MCAHMSDENAOJFZ-BVXDHVRPSA-N
- SMILES: NC(=O)O[C@H]1C(/C)=C/[C@H](C)[C@@H](OC)[C@@H](OC)C[C@H](C)[C@@H](OC)C\2=C\C(=O)\C=C(\NC(=O)C(\C)=C\C=C/[C@@H]1OC)C/2=O

Properties
Chemical formula	C_{30}H_{42}N_{2}O_{9}
Molar mass	574.671 g·mol^{−1}
Solubility	hygroscopic

Hazards
- Occupational safety and health (OHS/OSH)
Main hazards	toxic
- Except where otherwise noted, data are given for materials in their standard state (at 25 °C [77 °F], 100 kPa). verify (what is ?) Infobox references

Herbimycin is a benzoquinone ansamycin antibiotic that binds to Hsp90 (Heat Shock Protein 90) and alters its function. Hsp90 client proteins play important roles in the regulation of the cell cycle, cell growth, cell survival, apoptosis, angiogenesis and oncogenesis.

It was originally found by its herbicidal activity, and thus named. The most recent herbimycins to be discovered, herbimycins D-F, were isolated from a Streptomyces isolated from thermal vents associated with the Ruth Mullins coal fire in Appalachian Kentucky.

== Synonyms ==
- Antibiotic Tan 420F
- Herbimycin A

== Biological activity ==
Herbimycin induces the degradation of proteins that are need to be mutated in tumor cells such as v-Src, Bcr-Abl and p53 preferentially over their normal cellular counterparts. This effect is mediated via Hsp90.

== See also ==
- Geldanamycin
- Satoshi Ōmura
