= Embleya =

Scientific classification
- Domain: Bacteria
- Kingdom: Bacillati
- Phylum: Actinomycetota
- Class: Actinomycetes
- Order: Streptomycetales
- Family: Streptomycetaceae
- Genus: Embleya; Nouioui et al. 2018

Type species
- Embleya scabrispora (Ping et al. 2004) Nouioui et al. 2018

Species
- E. hyalina; E. scabrispora

Genus of bacteria

Embleya is a genus of Actinomycetota in the family Streptomycetaceae.

== Phylogeny ==
The currently accepted taxonomy is based on the List of Prokaryotic names with Standing in Nomenclature (LPSN) and National Center for Biotechnology Information (NCBI).

16S rRNA based LTP_10_2024

- Embleya
  - E. hyalina Komaki et al. 2020
  - E. scabrispora (Ping et al. 2004) Nouioui et al. 2018

120 marker proteins based GTDB 10-RS226

- Embleya
  - E. hyalina
  - E. scabrispora

== See also ==
- List of bacterial orders
- List of bacteria genera
