= Yinghuangia =

Scientific classification
- Domain: Bacteria
- Kingdom: Bacillati
- Phylum: Actinomycetota
- Class: Actinomycetes
- Order: Streptomycetales
- Family: Streptomycetaceae
- Genus: Yinghuangia; Nouioui et al. 2018

Type species
- Yinghuangia aomiensis (Nagai et al. 2011) Nouioui et al. 2018

Species
- Y. aomiensis; Y. catbensis; Y. seranimata; Y. soli

Synonyms
- "Streptodolium" Kalkreuter et al. 2024

Genus of bacteria

Yinghuangia is an Actinobacteria genus in the family Streptomycetaceae.

== Phylogeny ==
The currently accepted taxonomy is based on the List of Prokaryotic names with Standing in Nomenclature (LPSN) and National Center for Biotechnology Information (NCBI).

16S rRNA based LTP_10_2024

- Yinghuangia
  - Y. soli
  - - Y. aomiensis
    - - Y. catbensis (Sakiyama et al. 2014) Komaki and Tamura 2019
      - Y. seranimata

120 marker proteins based GTDB 10-RS226

- Yinghuangia
  - Y. aomiensis (Nagai et al. 2011) Nouioui et al. 2018
  - - Y. seranimata (Wang et al. 2012) Komaki and Tamura 2019
    - - "Streptodolium elevatio" Kalkreuter et al. 2024
      - Y. soli Yao et al. 2023

== See also ==
- List of bacterial orders
- List of bacteria genera
