= Alazopeptin =

Chemical compound

Clinical data
- ATC code: None

Identifiers
- IUPAC name: 6-diazo-2-{6-diazo-5-oxo-2-[(prop-2-en-1-yl)amino]hexanamido}-5-oxohexanoic acid
- CAS Number: 1397-84-8
- PubChem CID: 5486654
- ChemSpider: 16735646
- UNII: H2QL5CU7EQ
- ChEMBL: ChEMBL92957

Chemical and physical data
- Formula: C_{15}H_{20}N_{6}O_{5}
- Molar mass: 364.362 g·mol^{−1}
- 3D model (JSmol): Interactive image
- SMILES: C=CCNC(CCC(=C[N+]#N)[O-])C(=O)NC(CCC(=C[N+]#N)[O-])C(=O)O
- InChI: InChI=1S/C15H20N6O5/c1-2-7-18-12(5-3-10(22)8-19-16)14(24)21-13(15(25)26)6-4-11(23)9-20-17/h2,8-9,12-13,18H,1,3-7H2,(H2-2,21,22,23,24,25,26)/b10-8-,11-9-; Key:RCQIFJCPIWRTAF-WGEIWTTOSA-N

Alazopeptin is an antibiotic, with moderate anti-trypanosomal and antitumor activity. It was originally isolated from Streptacidiphilus griseoplanus, sourced from soil near Williamsburg, Iowa. It is also isolated from Kitasatospora azatica It is still largely produced via fermentation broths of that organism. Structurally, alazopeptin is a tripeptide and contains 2 molecules of 6-diazo-5-oxo-L-norleucine and one molecule of L-alanine. In 2021 the biosynthetic pathway of alazopeptin was elucidated.
