= Kitasato Shibasaburō =

Japanese physician and bacteriologist (1853–1931)

Baron Kitasato Shibasaburō
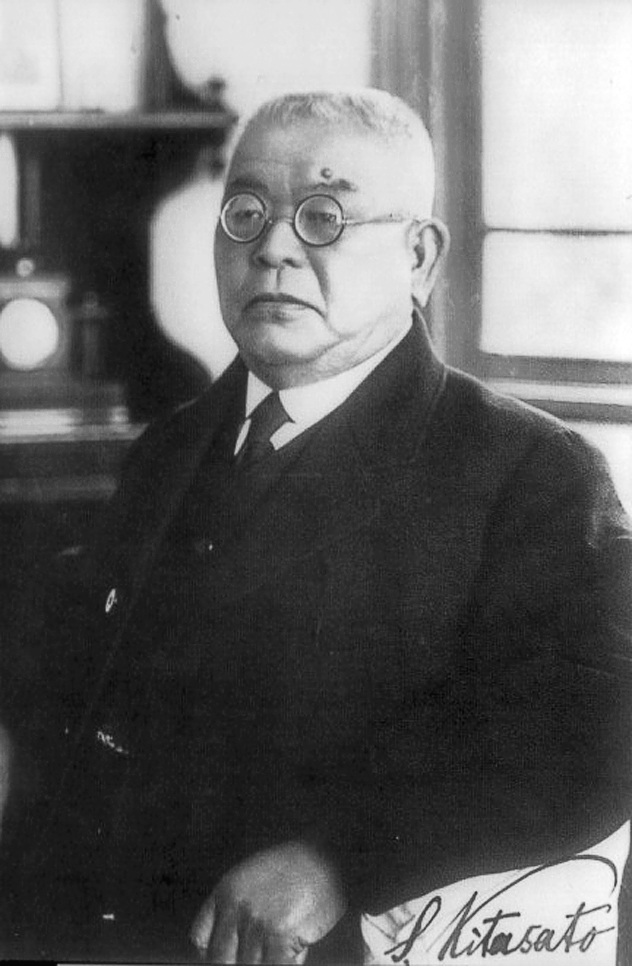
- Born: January 29, 1853; Oguni, Kumamoto, Japan
- Died: June 13, 1931 (aged 78); Tokyo, Japan
- Known for: Co-discoverer of Bubonic plague in Hong Kong
- Scientific career
- Fields: Bacteriology
- Workplaces: Tokyo Imperial University

Baron Kitasato (Note: His family name is pronounced Kitazato. He spelled his name as Kitasato while studying in Germany, where the single s is pronounced [z].) Shibasaburō (北里 柴三郎; Japanese pronunciation: [k̟ʲi̥.tä́.(d͡)zä́.tó̞ | ɕì.bä́.sä́.bɯ̈̀.ɾò̞ò̞, -tó̞ ɕí-]; January 29 [O.S. 17 January], 1853 – June 13, 1931) was a Japanese physician and bacteriologist. He is remembered as the co-discoverer of the infectious agent of bubonic plague in Hong Kong during an outbreak in 1894, almost simultaneously with Alexandre Yersin.

Kitasato was nominated for the first annual Nobel Prize in Physiology or Medicine in 1901. Kitasato and Emil von Behring, working together in Berlin in 1890, announced the discovery of diphtheria antitoxin serum. Von Behring was awarded the 1901 Nobel Prize because of this work, but Kitasato was not.

== Biography ==
Kitasato was born in Okuni village, Higo Province, (present-day Oguni Town, Kumamoto Prefecture, Kyūshū), the son of Kitasato Korenobu, a village head, and Tei, the daughter of a samurai. His parents were strict about his education and sent him to a relative's home and requested rigid discipline. He is said to have inherited his leadership qualities from his mother. He was educated at Kumamoto Medical School and a predecessor of Tokyo Imperial University.

He studied under Robert Koch in the University of Berlin from 1885 to 1891. In 1889, he became the first person to grow the tetanus bacillus in pure culture, and in 1890 cooperated with Emil von Behring in developing a serum therapy for tetanus using this pure culture. He also worked on antitoxins for diphtheria and anthrax. Kitasato and Behring demonstrated the value of antitoxin in preventing disease by causing passive immunity to tetanus in an animal that received graded injections of blood serum from another animal infected with the disease. Kitasato's discoveries on tetanus and von Behring's work on diphtheria led to the field of serotherapy, which has benefitted many worldwide.

After returning to Japan in 1891, he founded the Institute for Study of Infectious Diseases with the assistance of Fukuzawa Yukichi. One of his early assistants was August von Wassermann. Kitasato demonstrated how dead cultures can be used in vaccination. He also studied the mode of infection in tuberculosis.

He traveled to Hong Kong in 1894 at the request of the Japanese government during an outbreak of the bubonic plague, and identified a bacterium that he concluded was causing the disease. Yersin, working separately, found the same organism several days later. Because Kitasato's initial reports were vague and somewhat contradictory, and later reports proved inaccurate, some scientific historians give Yersin sole credit for the discovery; while others advise dual credit. However, a thorough analysis of the morphology of the organism discovered by Kitasato by microbiologists determined that although his samples likely became contaminated with pneumococci later, leading to the conflicting reports from his laboratory, there is "little doubt that Kitasato did isolate, study, and reasonably characterize the plague bacillus" in Hong Kong and "should not be denied this credit". Four years later, Kitasato and his student Shiga Kiyoshi were able to isolate and describe the organism that caused dysentery.

After his work on the Bubonic Plague in Hong Kong, Kitasato continued his work on infectious diseases by researching Northeast Asian epidemic plagues and in 1909, he presented a paper on Tuberculosis in Europe. In 1911, Kitasato found himself in Manchuria amidst one of their most severe pneumonic plagues studying its prevention, as he believed his purpose was to investigate the science behind public health and provide advancement in that field.

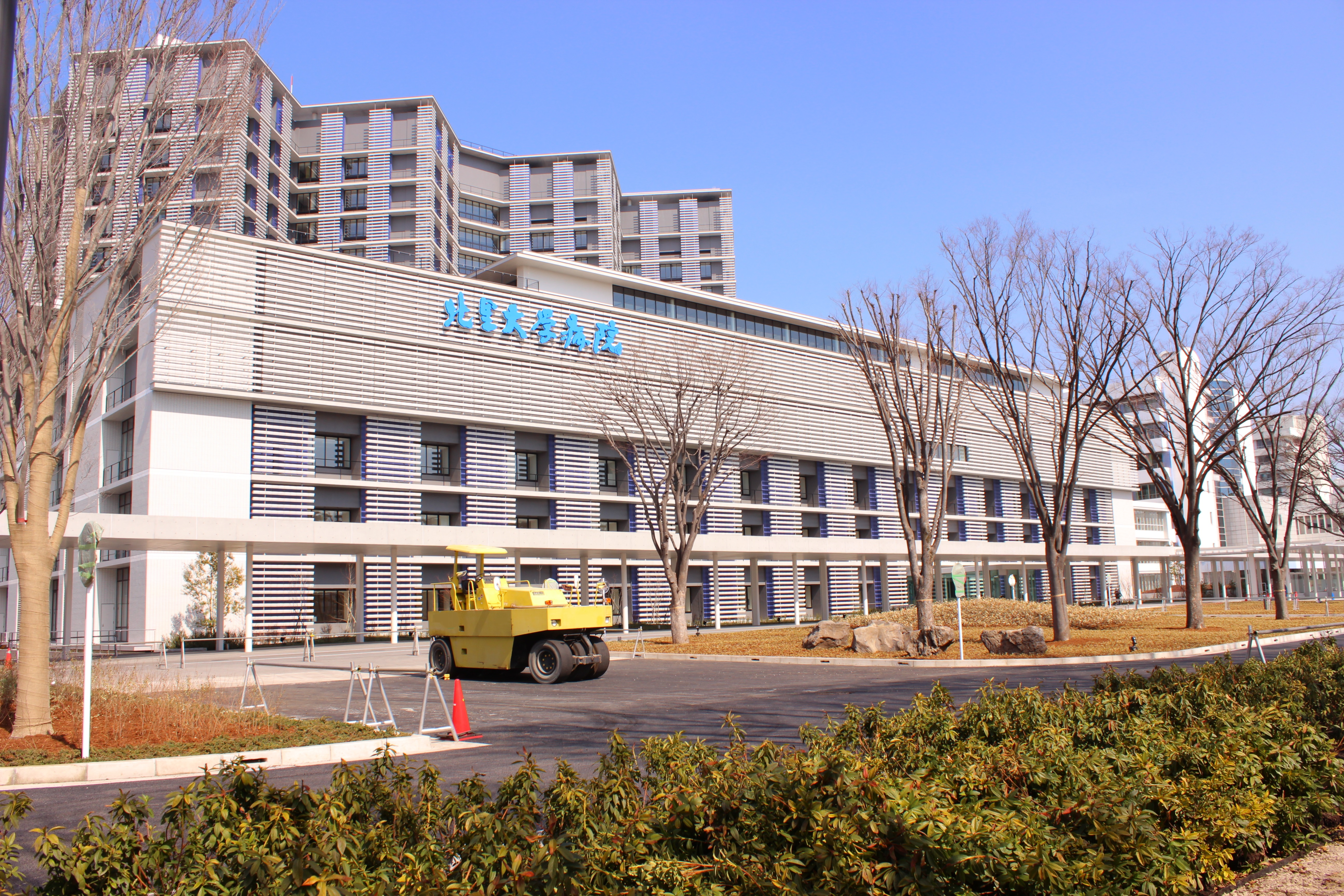
Kitasato University Hospital

When the Institute for Infectious Diseases was incorporated into Tokyo Imperial University in 1914, he resigned in protest and founded the Kitasato Institute (the forerunner of Kitasato University), which he headed for the rest of his life. While Kitasato was still involved with the activities of the newly established institute, he also organized a new medical facility, in collaboration with Fukuzawa Yukichi, that has since become a prominent center of medical learning in Japan.

In September 1921, Kitasato founded, together with several medical scientists, the Sekisen Ken-onki Corporation, with the intention of manufacturing the most reliable clinical thermometer possible. The company was later renamed Terumo Corporation.

Kitasato also was the first dean of medicine at Keio University, first president of the Japan Medical Association, and served on the House of Peers. He was ennobled with the title of danshaku (baron) in the kazoku peerage system in February 1924. Although Kitasato transitioned from actively studying disease to politics and conferences, he continued improving upon his work on tuberculosis up until his death and made significant contributions in the realm of public health.

Kitasato was elected an International Member of the American Philosophical Society in 1914.

Kitasato Shibasaburō died of an intracranial hemorrhage at his home in Azabu, Tokyo, on June 13, 1931. His grave is at the Aoyama Cemetery in Tokyo.

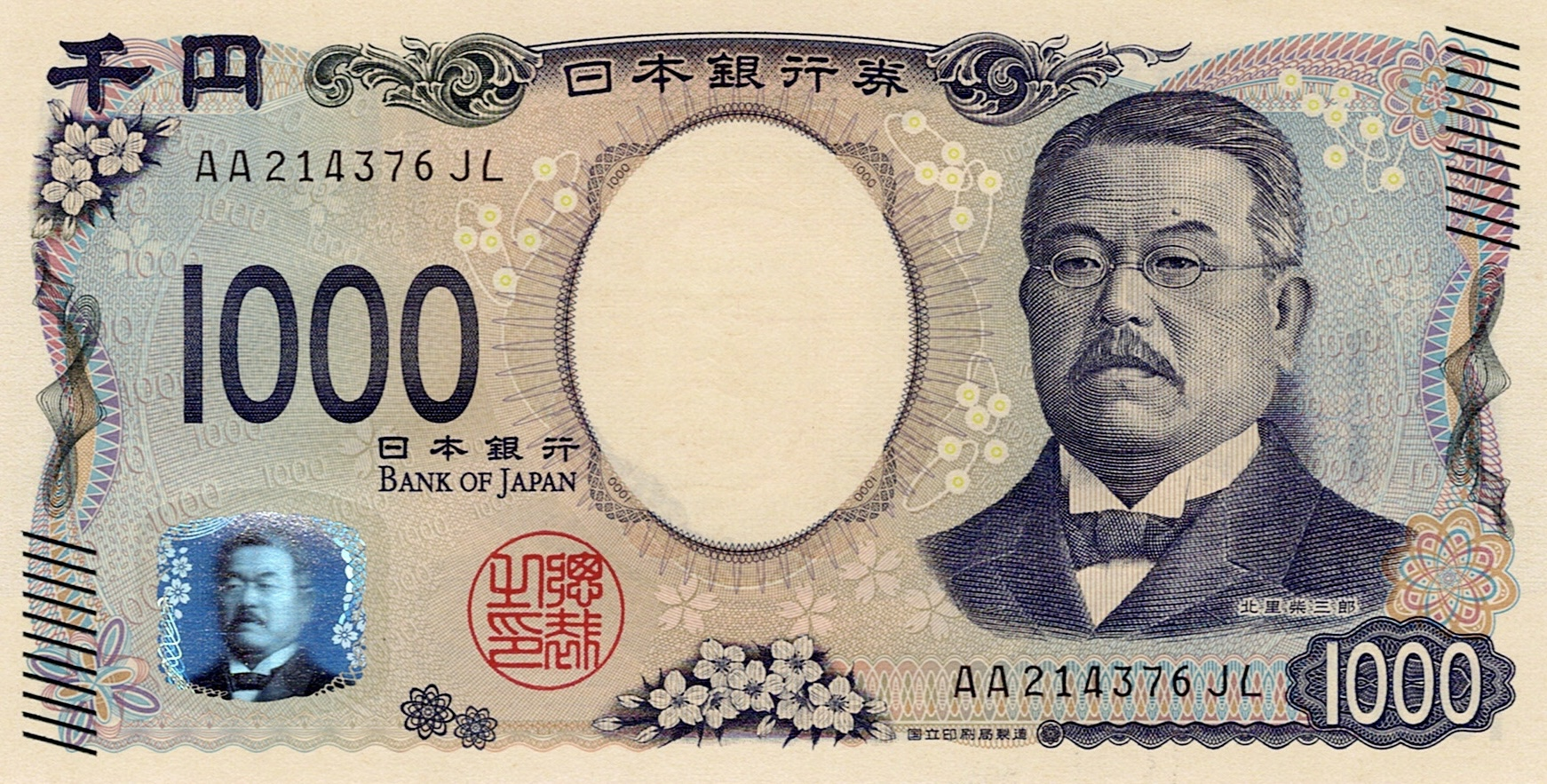
Portrait of Kitasato on the 1,000 yen banknote

His portrait is adorned on the new 1,000 yen banknote issued in July 2024.

== See also ==
- Kitasato flask, laboratory glassware named in his honor
- Kitasatospora, an Actinobacteria genus named after Kitasato Shibasaburō
- Satoshi Ōmura
