= Satoshi Ōmura =

Japanese biochemist, Nobel laureate in medicine (born 1935)

- 大村 智
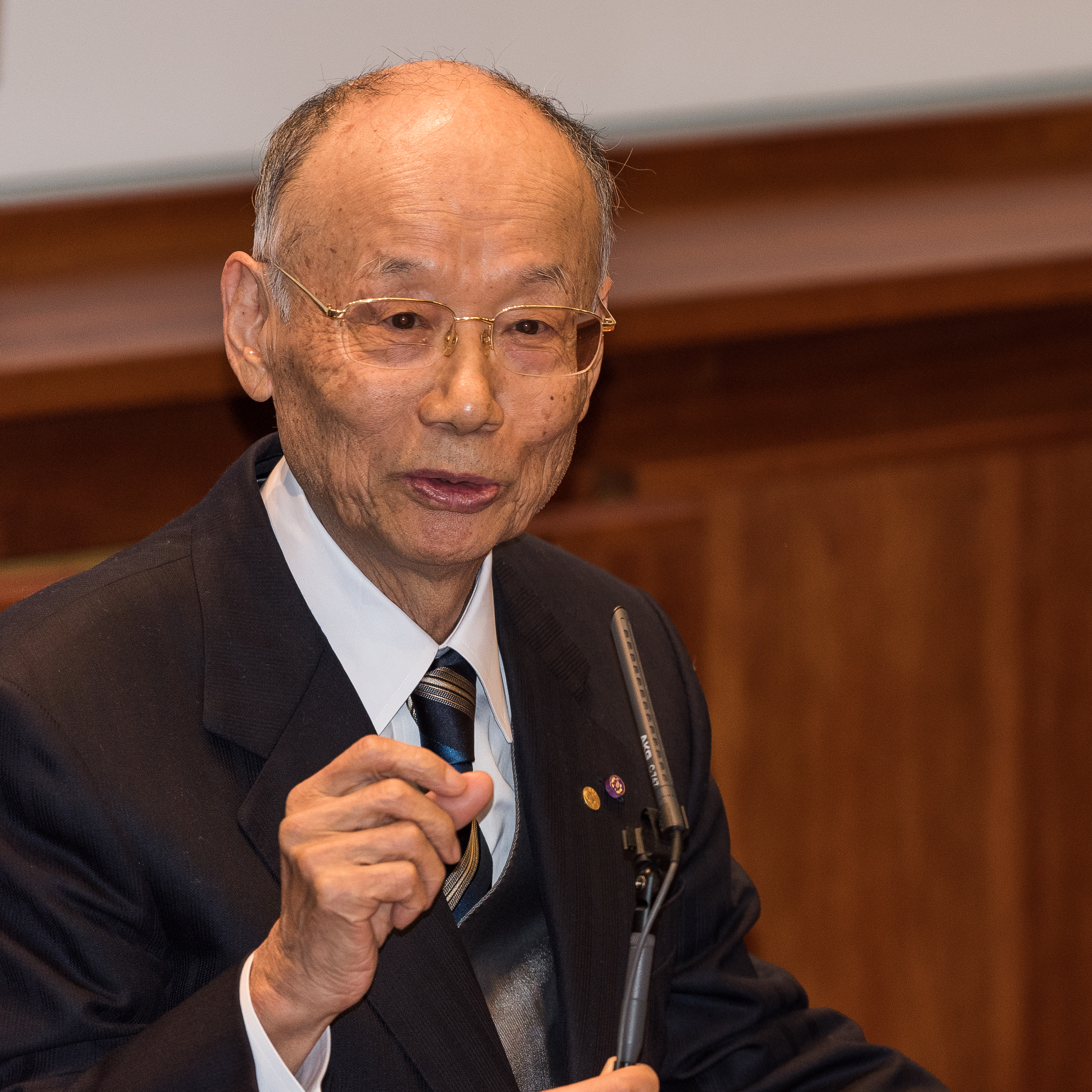
- Ōmura in Stockholm, December 2015
- Born: 12 July 1935 (age 91); Nirasaki, Yamanashi, Japan
- Education: University of Yamanashi (BS); Tokyo University of Science (MS, ScD); University of Tokyo (PhD)
- Known for: Avermectin and Ivermectin; Discovery of more than 480 new compounds
- Awards: Japan Academy Prize (1990); Koch Gold Medal (1997); Ernest Guenther Award in the Chemistry of Natural Products (2005); Tetrahedron Prize for Creativity in Organic Chemistry (2010); Gairdner Global Health Award (2014); Nobel Prize in Physiology or Medicine (2015)
- Scientific career
- Fields: Biochemistry
- Workplaces: Kitasato University; Wesleyan University
- Academic advisors: Koji Nakanishi; Max Tishler

Satoshi Ōmura (大村 智, Ōmura Satoshi; [oːmɯɾa saꜜtoɕi]; born 12 July 1935) is a Japanese biochemist. He is known for the discovery and development of hundreds of pharmaceuticals originally occurring in microorganisms. In 2015 he shared the Nobel Prize in Physiology or Medicine with Tu Youyou and with William C. Campbell for their role in the discovery of the world's first endectocide, ivermectin, a safe and highly effective microfilaricide. It is believed that the large molecular size of ivermectin prevents it from crossing the blood/aqueous humour barrier, and renders the drug an important treatment of helminthically-derived blindness.

== Early life and education ==
Satoshi Ōmura was born in Nirasaki, Yamanashi, Japan, in 1935, the second son of Ōmura family. After graduating from the University of Yamanashi in 1958, he was appointed to science teacher at Tokyo Metropolitan Sumida Tech High School. In 1960, he became an auditor of Koji Nakanishi's course at Tokyo University of Education, one year later, he enrolled in the Tokyo University of Science (TUS) and studied sciences. Ōmura received his M.S. degree from TUS and his Ph.D. in Pharmaceutical Sciences from the University of Tokyo (1968, a Dissertation PhD) and a Ph.D. in Chemistry at TUS (1970).

== Career ==
Since 1965 Ōmura served at Kitasato Institute system. From 1970 to 1990, he also became a part-time lecturer at Tokyo University of Science.

In 1971 while he was a visiting professor at Wesleyan University, he consulted the chairman of the American Chemical Society, Max Tishler, at an international conference. Together they successfully acquired research expenses from Merck & Co. Ōmura was considering continuing his research in the United States, but ultimately he decided to return to Japan.

In 1973, he became a director of the antibiotic laboratory at Kitasato University, and he also started collaborative research with Merck & Co.

In 1975, he became professor of Kitasato University School of Pharmacy. Meanwhile, the Ōmura laboratory raised many researchers and produced 31 university professors and 120 doctors.

At present date, Ōmura is professor emeritus at Kitasato University and Max Tishler Professor of Chemistry at Wesleyan University.

== Research ==
Skeletal formula of avermectin B_{1}, one of Omura's discoveries

Satoshi Ōmura is known for the discovery and development of various pharmaceuticals originally occurring in microorganisms. He was awarded the 2015 Nobel Prize in Physiology or Medicine jointly with William C. Campbell for discoveries concerning a novel therapy against infections caused by roundworm parasites. More precisely, his research group isolated a strain of Streptomyces avermitilis that produce the anti-parasitical compound avermectin. Campbell later acquired these bacteria and developed the derived drug ivermectin that was commercialised for veterinary use in 1981, later put to human use against Onchocerciasis in 1987–88 with the name Mectizan, and is used against river blindness, lymphatic filariasis, scabies, other parasitic infections.

Since the 1970s, Ōmura has discovered more than 480 new compounds, of which 25 kinds of drugs and reagents are in use. Examples include andrastin, herbimycin, neoxaline as well as:

- a specific inhibitor of protein kinase named staurosporine;
- a proteasome inhibitor named lactacystin;
- a fatty acid biosynthesis inhibitor named cerulenin;

Furthermore, compounds having a unique structure and biological activity discovered by Omura are drawing attention in drug discovery research, and new anticancer drugs and the like have been created.

=== Selected publications ===
- S. Omura; Y. Iwai; A. Hirano; A. Nakagawa; J. Awaya; H. Tsuchya; Y. Takahashi; R. Masuma (April 1977). "A new alkaloid AM-2282 OF Streptomyces origin. Taxonomy, fermentation, isolation and preliminary characterization". The Journal of Antibiotics. 30 (4): 275–82. doi:10.7164/antibiotics.30.275. ISSN 0021-8820. PMID 863788. Wikidata Q28279608.
- R. W. Burg; B. M. Miller; E. E. Baker; et al. (March 1979). "Avermectins, new family of potent anthelmintic agents: producing organism and fermentation". Antimicrobial Agents and Chemotherapy. 15 (3): 361–7. doi:10.1128/aac.15.3.361. ISSN 0066-4804. PMC 352666. PMID 464561. Wikidata Q24598202.
- D A Hopwood; F Malpartida; H M Kieser; et al. (1 April 1985). "Production of 'hybrid' antibiotics by genetic engineering". Nature. 314 (6012): 642–644. doi:10.1038/314642a0. ISSN 1476-4687. PMID 3857464. Wikidata Q59071761.
- H Ikeda; T Nonomiya; M Usami; T Ohta; Satoshi Ōmura (1 August 1999). "Organization of the biosynthetic gene cluster for the polyketide anthelmintic macrolide avermectin in Streptomyces avermitilis". Proceedings of the National Academy of Sciences of the United States of America. 96 (17): 9509–9514. Bibcode:1999PNAS...96.9509I. doi:10.1073/pnas.96.17.9509. ISSN 0027-8424. PMC 22239. PMID 10449723. Wikidata Q33871234.
- Masahiko Hayashi; Mun-Chual Rho; Akiko Enomoto; et al. (4 November 2002). "Suppression of bone resorption by madindoline A, a novel nonpeptide antagonist to gp130". Proceedings of the National Academy of Sciences of the United States of America. 99 (23): 14728–14733. Bibcode:2002PNAS...9914728H. doi:10.1073/pnas.232562799. ISSN 0027-8424. PMC 137487. PMID 12417753. Wikidata Q34379185.
- Tomoyasu Hirose; Toshiaki Sunazuka; Satoshi Omura (1 January 2010). "Recent development of two chitinase inhibitors, Argifin and Argadin, produced by soil microorganisms". Proceedings of the Japan Academy, Series B. 86 (2): 85–102. doi:10.2183/pjab.86.85. ISSN 0386-2208. PMC 3417560. PMID 20154467. Wikidata Q34098670.
- Nobuyuki Matoba; Adam S Husk; Brian W Barnett; et al. (2010). "HIV-1 neutralization profile and plant-based recombinant expression of actinohivin, an Env glycan-specific lectin devoid of T-cell mitogenic activity". PLOS One. 5 (6) e11143. Bibcode:2010PLoSO...511143M. doi:10.1371/journal.pone.0011143. ISSN 1932-6203. PMC 2886112. PMID 20559567. Wikidata Q21076115.
- Hirofumi Nakano; Satoshi Omura (9 January 2009). "Chemical biology of natural indolocarbazole products: 30 years since the discovery of staurosporine". The Journal of Antibiotics. 62 (1): 17–26. doi:10.1038/ja.2008.4. ISSN 0021-8820. PMID 19132059. Wikidata Q34918248.
- Ōmura, S. (2011). "Microbial metabolites: 45 years of wandering, wondering and discovering". Tetrahedron. 67 (35): 6420–6459. doi:10.1016/j.tet.2011.03.117.

== Social role ==
Ōmura served as deputy director and director at the Kitasato Institute. He was devoted to rebuild the laboratory and promoting the establishment of the medical center that is now Kitasato University Medical Center. Meanwhile, he established a path to rebuilding of the corporate school juridical person, which has integrated with the School corporation Kitasato Gakuen. He succeeded in establishing a new "School corporation Kitasato Institute". In addition, he served as president of the School corporation Joshibi University of Art and Design twice, and served as the honorary school chief of the School corporation Kaichi Gakuen. In 2007, he established the Nirasaki Omura Art Museum on his collection.

== Awards and honors ==
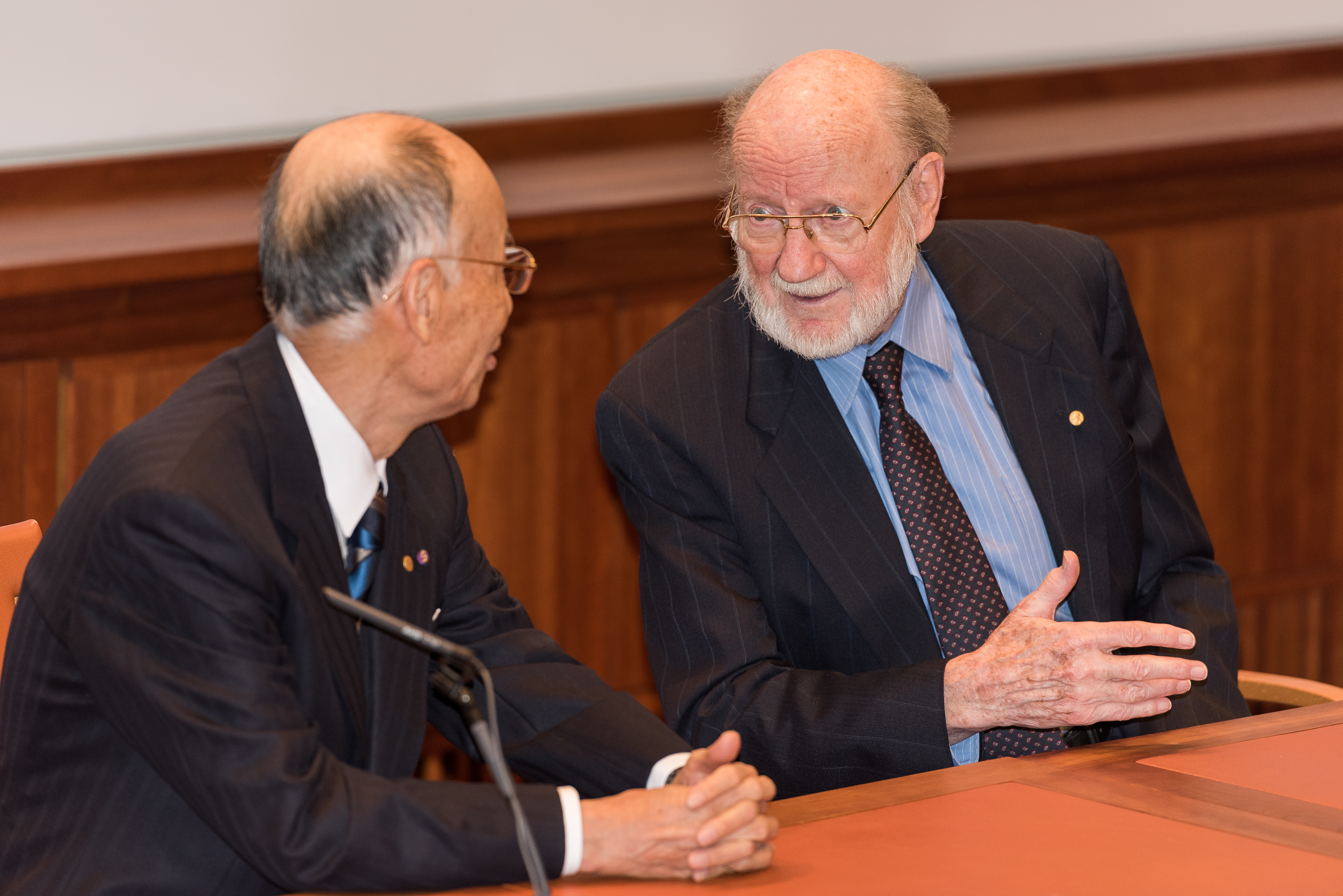
Satoshi Ōmura (left) and William C. Campbell (right) in Stockholm, December 2015.

Statues of children leading adults blinded by onchocerciasis, outside Kitasato University buildings, were produced by sculptors of Burkina Faso in honor of Ōmura's invention of avermectin and ivermectin, a symbol of the campaign to eradicate onchocerciasis. Similar life-sized bronze statues were erected at World Health Organization (WHO) headquarters in Geneva, Carter Center, Merck & Co., World Bank Headquarters, and Burkina Faso's World Health Organization Africa Onchocerciasis Control Program.

- 1985 – Hoechst-Roussel Award
- 1986 – The Pharmaceutical Society of Japan Award
- 1988 – Uehara Prize
- 1990 – Japan Academy Prize (academics)
- 1992 – Medal with Purple Ribbon
- 1995 – Fujihara Award
- 1997 – Robert Koch Gold Medal
- 1998 – Prince Mahidol Award
- 2000 – Nakanishi Prize (American Chemical Society and Chemical Society of Japan)
- 2005 – Ernest Guenther Award in the Chemistry of Natural Products (American Chemical Society)
- 2007 – Hamao Umezawa Memorial Award
- 2008 – Knight of the Legion of Honour of France
- 2010 – Tetrahedron Prize for Creativity in Organic Chemistry
- 2011 – Arima Award
- 2011 – Order of the Sacred Treasure, Gold and Silver Star
- 2012 – Person of Cultural Merit
- 2014 – Canada Gairdner Global Health Award
- 2015 – Asahi Prize
- 2015 – The Order of Cultural Merit
- 2015 – Nobel Prize in Physiology or Medicine
- 2016 – Japan Bioindustry Association (JBA) Special Honorary Award
- 2016 – Society for Actinomycetes Japan (SAJ) Special Honorary Award
- 2016 – Asian Scientist 100, Asian Scientist

=== Honorary doctorates ===
List of honorary doctorates:

- 1992 – Lajos Kossuth University, Hungary
- 1994 – Wesleyan University, USA
- 2016 – Shanghai Jiao Tong University, China
- 2018 – University of St Andrews, Scotland

== Learned societies membership ==
- 1992 – Academy of Sciences Leopoldina
- 1999 – National Academy of Sciences
- 2001 – Japan Academy
- 2002 – Académie des sciences
- 2005 – Russian Academy of Sciences
- 2005 – Royal Society of Chemistry
- 2005 – Academia Europaea
- 2006 – Chinese Academy of Engineering
- 2009 – Japan Society for Bioscience, Biotechnology and Agrochemistry
- 2014 – Pharmaceutical Society of Japan
- 2016 – Japan Pharmaceutical Association
- 2016 – Japan Society of Synthetic Organic Chemistry
- 2016 – Japan Society of Chemotherapy

== See also ==
- Lactacystin, Cerulenin, Andrastin A, Herbimycin, and Neoxaline
- Koji Nakanishi
- Tohru Fukuyama
- Kitasato Shibasaburō
- List of Japanese Nobel laureates
- List of Nobel laureates affiliated with the University of Tokyo
