= Kitasato University =

Medical university in Tokyo, Japan

Coordinates: 35°38′33.21″N 139°43′32.27″E

- 北里大学
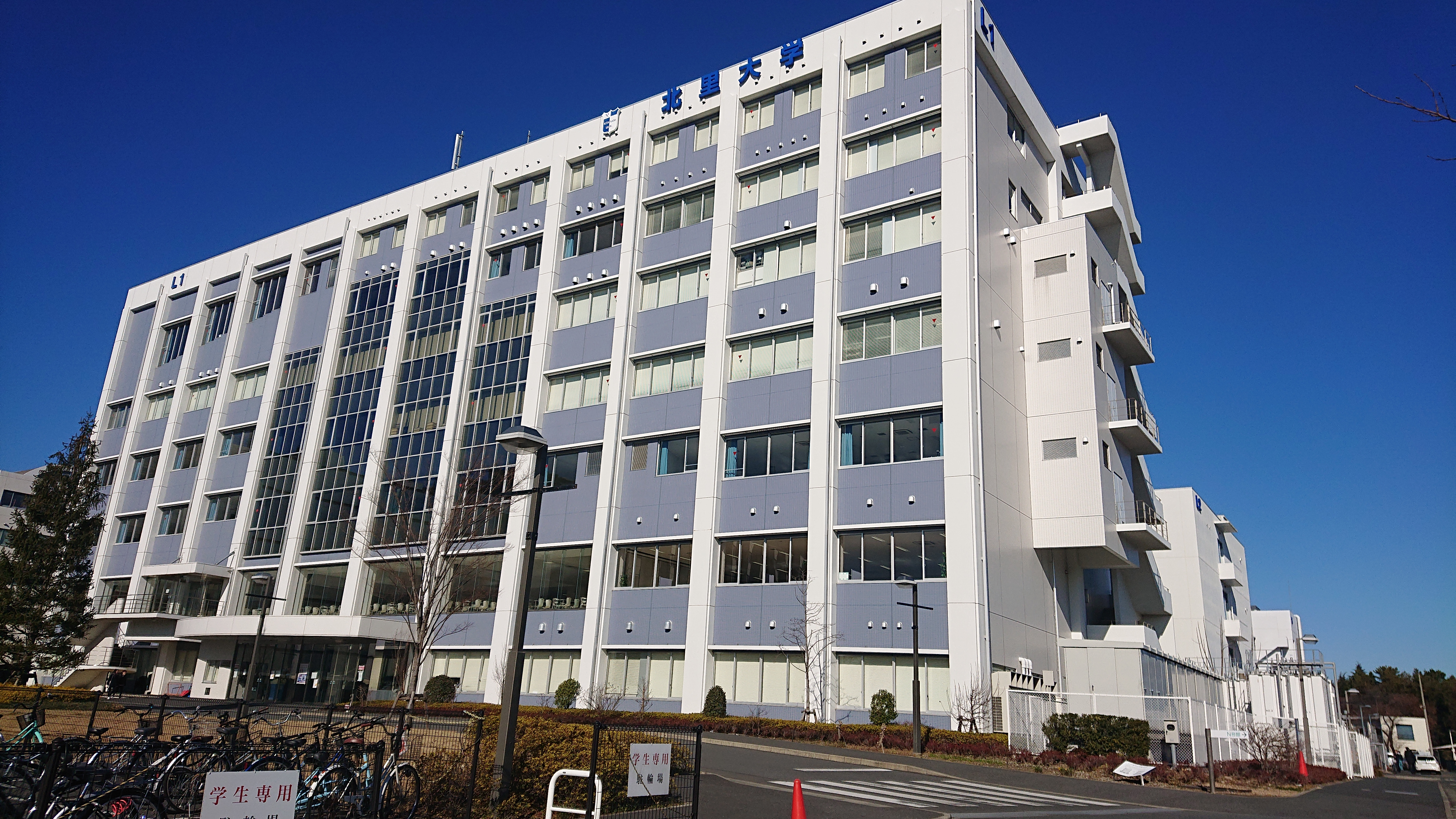
- Sagamihara Campus
- Type: Private university
- Established: 1962
- President: Toshiaki Sunazuka, Ph.D.
- Faculty: 1,725 (May 2019)
- Administrative staff: 4,179 (May 2019)
- Students: 8,340 (May 2019)
- Undergraduates: 7,716
- Postgraduates: 624
- Doctoral students: 259
- Location: Minato, Tokyo, Japan
- Campus: Urban
- Website: www.kitasato-u.ac.jp/en/index.html

Kitasato University (北里大学, Kitasato Daigaku) is a private medical university headquartered in Shirokane, Minato, Tokyo, Japan. The head of the university is on the Shirokane campus, neighboring the original Kitasato Institute, the first private medical research facility in Japan which was the starting point for the existing university.

== History ==
The school was named after Kitasato Shibasaburō, who was nominated for the Nobel Prize in Physiology or Medicine in 1901.

The 2015 Nobel Prize in Physiology or Medicine was awarded to Satoshi Ōmura, a professor at Kitasato University.

In 2018, it was accused of discriminating against applicants for their age and gender.

== Organization ==
=== Undergraduate schools ===
- School of Pharmacy
- School of Veterinary Medicine
- School of Medicine
- School of Marine Biosciences
- School of Nursing
- School of Science
  - Department of Physics
  - Department of Chemistry
  - Department of Biological Sciences
- School of Allied Health Sciences
  - Department of Health Science
  - Department of Medical Laboratory Sciences
  - Department of Medical Engineering and Technology
  - Department of Rehabilitation
- School of Frontier Engineering
- School of Health Sciences
- College of Liberal Arts and Sciences

=== Graduate schools ===
- Graduate School of Pharmaceutical Sciences
- Graduate School of Veterinary Sciences
- Graduate School of Marine Biosciences
- Graduate School of Nursing
- Graduate School of Science
- Graduate School of Medical Sciences
- Graduate School of Frontier Engineering
- Graduate School of Infection Control Sciences

=== Vocational schools ===
- Kitasato Junior College of Health and Hygienic Sciences
- Kitasato Nursing School

=== Research institutes ===
- Ōmura Satoshi Memorial Institute

=== Affiliated hospitals ===
- Kitasato University Hospital
- Kitasato University Kitasato Institute Hospital
- Kitasato University Medical Center

== Academics ==
Its major educational facilities are on the Sagamihara campus, 60 km west of central Tokyo. The departments include the School of Medicine, School of Allied Health Sciences, School of Pharmaceutical Studies, School of Veterinary Medicine and Animal Sciences, School of Marine Sciences, School of Nursing, and School of Science.
