= Streptomyces tateyamensis =

Scientific classification
- Domain: Bacteria
- Kingdom: Bacillati
- Phylum: Actinomycetota
- Class: Actinomycetes
- Order: Streptomycetales
- Family: Streptomycetaceae
- Genus: Streptomyces
- Species: S. tateyamensis

Binomial name
- Streptomyces tateyamensis Khan et al. 2010

Type strain
- DSM 41969, NBRC 105048, Sp080513SC-30

Species of bacterium

Streptomyces tateyamensis is a bacterium species from the genus of Streptomyces which has been isolated from the sponge Haliclona from the pacific coastline of the city Tateyama in the Chiba prefecture in Japan. Streptomyces tateyamensis produces the antibiotic thiopeptin B.

== See also ==
- List of Streptomyces species
