= Streptomyces novaecaesareae =

Scientific classification
- Domain: Bacteria
- Kingdom: Bacillati
- Phylum: Actinomycetota
- Class: Actinomycetes
- Order: Streptomycetales
- Family: Streptomycetaceae
- Genus: Streptomyces
- Species: S. novaecaesareae

Binomial name
- Streptomyces novaecaesareae Waksman and Henrici 1948

Type strain
- ATCC 27452, BCRC 15151, CBS 134.20, CBS 669.72, CCRC 15151, DSM 40358, IFO 13368, IMRU 3831, ISP 5358, JCM 4800, NBRC 13368, NRRL B-1267, NRRL B-3011, NRRL B-B-3011, NRRL-ISP 5358, RIA 1329, VKM Ac-963, WC 3831

Species of bacterium

Streptomyces novaecaesareae is a bacterium species from the genus of Streptomyces which has been isolated from soil in the United States.

== See also ==
- List of Streptomyces species
