= Streptomyces thermolineatus =

Scientific classification
- Domain: Bacteria
- Kingdom: Bacillati
- Phylum: Actinomycetota
- Class: Actinomycetes
- Order: Streptomycetales
- Family: Streptomycetaceae
- Genus: Streptomyces
- Species: S. thermolineatus

Binomial name
- Streptomyces thermolineatus Goodfellow et al. 1988

Type strain
- A1484, ATCC 51534, CGMCC 4.1901, DSM 41451, GoodfellowK47, HUT-6609, IFO 14750, JCM 6307, K47, KCTC 19947, LaceyA1484, NBRC 103020, NBRC 14750, NCIMB 12471

Species of bacterium

Streptomyces thermolineatus is a bacterium species from the genus of Streptomyces which has been isolated from sewage compost in Washington, D.C. in the United States.

== See also ==
- List of Streptomyces species
