= Streptacidiphilus =

Scientific classification
- Domain: Bacteria
- Kingdom: Bacillati
- Phylum: Actinomycetota
- Class: Actinomycetes
- Order: Streptomycetales
- Family: Streptomycetaceae
- Genus: Streptacidiphilus; Kim et al. 2003

Type species
- Streptacidiphilus albus Kim et al. 2003

Species
- See text

Genus of bacteria

Streptacidiphilus is an Actinobacteria genus in the family Streptomycetaceae.

== Phylogeny ==
The currently accepted taxonomy is based on the List of Prokaryotic names with Standing in Nomenclature (LPSN) and National Center for Biotechnology Information (NCBI).

16S rRNA based LTP_10_2024

- Streptacidiphilus
  - - S. carbonis Kim et al. 2003
    - - - S. albus Kim et al. 2003
        - S. durhamensis Golinska et al. 2014
      - - S. neutrinimicus Kim et al. 2003
        - - S. hamsterleyensis Golinska et al. 2014
          - S. torunensis Golinska, Dahm & Goodfellow 2017
  - - S. monticola Song et al. 2018
    - - S. jiangxiensis Huang et al. 2005
      - - S. anmyonensis Cho et al. 2008
        - - S. fuscans Yu et al. 2021
          - - S. melanogenes Cho et al. 2008
            - - S. pinicola Roh et al. 2018
              - S. rugosus Cho et al. 2008

120 marker proteins based GTDB 10-RS226

- Streptacidiphilus
  - - S. albus
    - - S. carbonis
      - S. jeojiensis Lee, Yang & Kim 2025
  - - S. rugosus
    - - S. fuscans
      - - S. jiangxiensis
        - - S. pinicola
          - - S. anmyonensis
            - - S. melanogenes
              - S. neutrinimicus

Species incertae sedis:

- S. alkalitolerans Lee, Yang & Kim 2025
- S. cavernicola Lee, Yang & Kim 2025
- "S. griseisporus" Rodriguez, Ward & Goodfellow 2004
- "S. griseus" Rodriguez, Ward & Goodfellow 2004
- "S. luteoalbus" Rodriguez, Ward & Goodfellow 2004
- "S. specus" Lee 2007d
- "S. thailandensis" Rodriguez, Ward & Goodfellow 2004

== See also ==
- List of bacterial orders
- List of bacteria genera
