= Hitachimycin =

Chemical compound

Clinical data
- ATC code: none

Identifiers
- IUPAC name: (2Z,4E,6E,12E)-16,20-dihydroxy-21-methoxy- 3-methyl-10-phenyl-9-azabicyclo[17.3.0] docosa-2,4,6,12,19-pentaene-8,18-dione
- CAS Number: 77642-19-4
- PubChem CID: 5384563
- ChemSpider: 10306390
- UNII: LDW8TT2M3F
- CompTox Dashboard (EPA): DTXSID60894881

Chemical and physical data
- Formula: C_{29}H_{35}NO_{5}
- Molar mass: 477.601 g·mol^{−1}
- 3D model (JSmol): Interactive image
- SMILES: O[C@H]1CC\C=C\C[C@H](NC(=O)\C=C\C=C\C(\C)=C/[C@H]2C[C@H](OC)C(\O)=C2\C(=O)C1)c3ccccc3
- InChI: InChI=1S/C29H35NO5/c1-20-11-9-10-16-27(33)30-24(21-12-5-3-6-13-21)15-8-4-7-14-23(31)19-25(32)28-22(17-20)18-26(35-2)29(28)34/h3-6,8-13,16-17,22-24,26,31,34H,7,14-15,18-19H2,1-2H3,(H,30,33)/b8-4+,11-9+,16-10+,20-17-/t22-,23-,24-,26-/m0/s1; Key:PLQKHNPZPRTISL-QSQNXQFYSA-N

Hitachimycin, also known as stubomycin, is a cyclic polypeptide produced by Streptomyces that acts as an antibiotic. It exhibits cytotoxic activity against mammalian cells, Gram-positive bacteria, yeast, and fungi, as well as hemolytic activity; this is mediated by changes at the cell membrane and subsequent lysis. Owing to its cytotoxic activity against mammalian cells and tumors, it was first proposed as an antitumor antibiotic.

As of 2007, it has not been used in a clinical setting.
