= Neoxaline =

Names
- IUPAC name (14E)-11-hydroxy-14-(1H-imidazol-5-ylmethylidene)-2-methoxy-9-(2-methylbut-3-en-2-yl)-2,13,16-triazatetracyclo[7.7.0.0^{1,13}.0^{3,8}]hexadeca-3,5,7-triene-12,15-dione
- Other names Nedoxaline

Identifiers
CAS Number	71812-10-7
3D model (JSmol)	Interactive image
ChemSpider	4944751
KEGG	C22172
PubChem CID	6440491
CompTox Dashboard (EPA)	DTXSID80893992
- InChI: InChI=1S/C23H25N5O4/c1-5-21(2,3)22-11-18(29)20(31)27-17(10-14-12-24-13-25-14)19(30)26-23(22,27)28(32-4)16-9-7-6-8-15(16)22/h5-10,12-13,18,29H,1,11H2,2-4H3,(H,24,25)(H,26,30)/b17-10+ Key: HHLNXXASUKFCCX-LICLKQGHSA-N
- SMILES: CC(C)(C=C)C12CC(C(=O)N\3C1(NC(=O)/C3=C\C4=CN=CN4)N(C5=CC=CC=C25)OC)O

Properties
Chemical formula	C_{23}H_{25}N_{5}O_{4}
Molar mass	435.484 g·mol^{−1}
- Except where otherwise noted, data are given for materials in their standard state (at 25 °C [77 °F], 100 kPa). Infobox references

Neoxaline is a bio-active Aspergillus japonicus isolate. It is an antimitotic agent and shows weak inhibitory activity of blood platelet aggregation. It stimulates the central nervous system. It has been synthesized through the "highly stereoselective introduction of a reverse prenyl group to create a quaternary carbon stereocenter using (−)-3a-hydroxyfuroindoline as a building block, construction of the indoline spiroaminal via cautious stepwise oxidations with cyclizations from the indoline, assembly of (Z)-dehydrohistidine, and photoisomerization of unnatural (Z)-neoxaline to the natural (E)-neoxaline."

== See also ==
- Satoshi Ōmura
