= David C. Smith (historian) =

American historian

- Born: 1929; Lewiston, Maine
- Died: 2009 (aged 79–80)

Academic work
- Discipline: History
- Institutions: University of Maine

David C. Smith (1929–2009) was Bird and Bird Professor of History at University of Maine, Orono. He studied the relationship between geography and wealth. He was born in Lewiston, Maine and wrote The First Century: A History of the University of Maine, 1865–1965, the seminal history of the University of Maine.

In 1994, Smith won the James Madison Prize of the Society for History in the Federal Government for his article with Judy Barrett Litoff, "To the Rescue of the Crops: The Women's Land Army in World War II".

== Publications ==
- Climate, Agriculture, History: An Introduction. In: Agricultural History, vol. 63, no. 2, 1989, pp. 1–6.
- David C. Smith, (1986) H. G. Wells: Desperately Mortal: A Biography, New Haven and London: Yale University Press.
