= The Journal of Antibiotics =

- Discipline: Microbiology
- Language: English
- Edited by: Kuniaki Tatsuta

Publication details
- History: 1948–present
- Publisher: Nature Publishing Group
- Frequency: Monthly
- Impact factor: 2.7 (2024)

Standard abbreviations
- ISO 4: J. Antibiot.
- NLM: J Antibiot (Tokyo)

Indexing
- CODEN: JANTAJ
- ISSN: 0021-8820 (print); 1881-1469 (web)
- OCLC no.: 01642415

Links
- Journal homepage; Archive 2005–2020 (vol. 58–73); Archive 1968–2004 (vol. 21–57)

The Journal of Antibiotics is a peer-reviewed medical journal published by the Nature Publishing Group for the Japan Antibiotics Research Association.

The journal seeks to endorse studies on antibiotics and associated types of biologically-active substances.

== Abstracting and indexing ==
The journal is abstracted and indexed for example in:

- CAB Abstracts
- Current Contents/Clinical Medicine
- MEDLINE
- Science Citation Index
- Scopus

According to the Journal Citation Reports, the journal has a 2022 impact factor of 3.3.
