= Lactacystin =

- Stereo skeletal formula of lactacystin ((2R)-2-amid, (2R,3S,4R)-3-hydrox,-2-((1S)-1-hydrox)prop,-4-meth)

Names
- Systematic IUPAC name (2R)-2-Acetamido-3-({(2R,3S,4R)-3-hydroxy-2-[(1S)-1-hydroxy-2-methylpropyl]-4-methyl-5-oxopyrrolidine-2-carbonyl}sulfanyl)propanoic acid

Identifiers
CAS Number	133343-34-7
3D model (JSmol)	Interactive image; Interactive image; Interactive image
ChEBI	CHEBI:52722
ChEMBL	ChEMBL374308
ChemSpider	3735; 2299173 (2R)-2-amid, (3S,4R)-3-hydrox,-2-((1S)-1-hydrox)prop,-4-meth
MeSH	Lactacystin
PubChem CID	3870; 45039639 (3S,4R)-3-hydrox,-2-((1R)-1-hydrox)prop,-4-meth; 46782036 (2R)-2-amid, (3S,4R)-3-hydrox,-2-((1R)-1-hydrox)prop,-4-meth; 3034764 (2R)-2-amid, (3S,4R)-3-hydrox,-2-((1S)-1-hydrox)prop,-4-meth
CompTox Dashboard (EPA)	DTXSID50897422
- InChI: InChI=1S/C15H24N2O7S/c1-6(2)10(19)15(11(20)7(3)12(21)17-15)14(24)25-5-9(13(22)23)16-8(4)18/h6-7,9-11,19-20H,5H2,1-4H3,(H,16,18)(H,17,21)(H,22,23) Key: DAQAKHDKYAWHCG-UHFFFAOYSA-N; InChI=1/C15H24N2O7S/c1-6(2)10(19)15(11(20)7(3)12(21)17-15)14(24)25-5-9(13(22)23)16-8(4)18/h6-7,9-11,19-20H,5H2,1-4H3,(H,16,18)(H,17,21)(H,22,23) Key: DAQAKHDKYAWHCG-WBMULXAQBF
- SMILES: CC(C)C(O)C1(NC(=O)C(C)C1O)C(=O)SCC(NC(C)=O)C(O)=O; CC(=O)NC(CSC(=O)C1(C(O)C(C)C)NC(=O)C(C)C1O)C(=O)O; OC1C(C)C(=O)NC1(C(=O)SCC(NC(C)=O)C(O)=O)C(O)C(C)C

Properties
Chemical formula	C_{15}H_{24}N_{2}O_{7}S
Molar mass	376.42 g·mol^{−1}
log P	0.086
Acidity (pK_{a})	3.106
Basicity (pK_{b})	10.891
- Except where otherwise noted, data are given for materials in their standard state (at 25 °C [77 °F], 100 kPa). verify (what is ?) Infobox references

Lactacystin is an organic compound naturally synthesized by bacteria of the genus Streptomyces first identified as an inducer of neuritogenesis in neuroblastoma cells in 1991. The target of lactacystin was subsequently found to be the proteasome on the basis of its affinity for certain catalytic subunits of the proteasome by Fenteany and co-workers in 1995. The proteasome is a protein complex responsible for the bulk of proteolysis in the cell, as well as proteolytic activation of certain protein substrates. Lactacystin was the first non-peptidic proteasome inhibitor discovered and is widely used as a research tool in biochemistry and cell biology. The transformation product of lactacystin clasto-lactacystin β-lactone (also known as omuralide) covalently modifies the amino-terminal threonine of specific catalytic subunits of the proteasome, a discovery that helped to establish the proteasome as a mechanistically novel class of protease: an amino-terminal threonine protease. The molecule is commonly used in biochemistry and cell biology laboratories as a selective inhibitor of the proteasome. The first total synthesis of lactacystin was developed in 1992 by Corey and Reichard, and a number of other syntheses of this molecule have also been published. There are more than 1,660 entries for lactacystin in PubMed as of January 2019.

== See also ==
- Satoshi Ōmura
