= Judy Barrett Litoff =

American editor (1944–2022)

Judy Barrett Litoff (December 23, 1944 – July 3, 2022) was an American editor and author, best known for her editorial work on books on American women's history. A graduate of the University of Maine, she has been professor of history at Bryant University since 1975.
