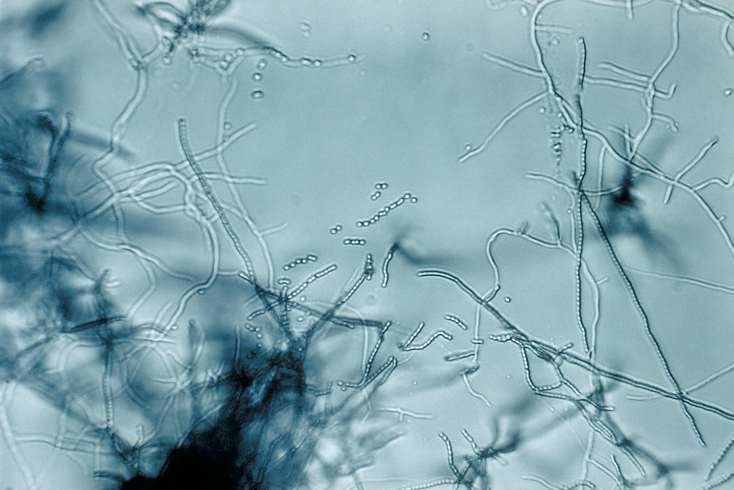
- Slide culture of a Streptomyces species

Scientific classification
- Domain: Bacteria
- Kingdom: Bacillati
- Phylum: Actinomycetota
- Class: Actinomycetes
- Order: Streptomycetales; Cavalier-Smith 2002
- Family: Streptomycetaceae; Waksman and Henrici 1943 (Approved Lists 1980)

Genera
- See text

Synonyms
- "Actinosporangiaceae" Couch 1955; Allostreptomycetaceae Salam et al. 2020

= Streptomycetaceae =

Family of bacteria

Streptomycetaceae is a family of the order Streptomycetales. It includes the important genus Streptomyces. This was the original source of many antibiotics, namely streptomycin, the first antibiotic against tuberculosis.

== Genomics ==
Sequence alignments of actinomycetotal genomes have led to the identification of three conserved signature indels which are unique to the order Streptomycetales. The enzyme PBGD contains a four-amino-acid insertion which is present in all Streptomyces species and Kitasatospora setae, but not any other Actinomycetota. Similarly, a one- amino-acid insertion is present in a conserved region of adenylate kinase and is found in all Streptomyces species and K. setae, but is not found in any other Actinomycetota. Five conserved signature proteins have also been identified which are present in various sequenced Streptomyces species, but not in K. setae; however, as the complete genome of K. setae has not yet been sequenced, these proteins may be present in K. setae. Additionally, 11 conserved signature proteins have been identified which are found in all sequenced Streptomyces species and K. setae. These proteins are believed to be unique to the Streptomycetales order, thus provide molecular markers which can be used to distinguish this group from the rest of the Actinomycetota. Phylogenetic trees indicate that the order Catenulisporales is closely related to the order Streptomycetales. This inference is supported by a one-amino-acid conserved signature indel which is uniquely found in all Streptomycetales species and Catenulisporales acidiphilia, the only Catenulisporales species whose complete genome has been sequenced. Additionally, three conserved signature proteins have been identified which are found in all Streptomycetales species and C. acidiphilia. Both the conserved signature indel and the conserved signature proteins provide evidence that the orders Streptomycetales and Catenulisporales are closely related.

== Phylogeny ==
The currently accepted taxonomy is based on the List of Prokaryotic names with Standing in Nomenclature (LPSN) and National Center for Biotechnology Information (NCBI).

Whole-genome analysis (Note: Allostreptomyces is not included in this phylogenetic tree.)

- Streptomycetaceae
  - Embleya
  - - - - Phaeacidiphilus
        - Streptacidiphilus
      - Kitasatospora
    - - Wenjunlia vitaminophila
      - Streptomyces

16S rRNA based LTP_10_2024

- Streptomycetaceae
  - Allostreptomyces
  - - Yinghuangia
    - - Embleya
      - - - Streptomyces thermolineatus
          - Wenjunlia
        - - - Streptantibioticus cattleyicolor
            - Streptomyces~1
          - - Streptantibioticus~1
            - Streptomyces [incl. Kitasatospora;
              Mangrovactinospora; Peterkaempfera;
              Phaeacidiphilus; Streptacidiphilus; Actinacidiphila]

120 marker proteins based GTDB 10-RS226

- Streptomycetaceae
  - - Embleya Nouioui et al. 2018
    - Yinghuangia Nouioui et al. 2018
  - - Allostreptomyces Huang et al. 2017
    - - Mangrovactinospora Madhaiyan et al. 2022
      - - - - Phaeacidiphilus Madhaiyan et al. 2022
            - Streptacidiphilus Kim et al. 2003
          - - Peterkaempfera Madhaiyan et al. 2022
            - Kitasatospora corrig. Ōmura et al. 1983
        - - Wenjunlia Madhaiyan et al. 2022
          - - Streptomyces thermolineatus Goodfellow, Lacey & Todd 1988
            - - - Actinacidiphila Madhaiyan et al. 2022
                - Streptantibioticus Madhaiyan et al. 2022
              - Streptomyces Waksman and Henrici 1943

== Notes ==
Genera incertae sedis:

- "Marinispora" Kwon et al. 2006
- "Parastreptomyces" Nichols et al. 2005
- "Streptodolium" Kalkreuter et al. 2024
- "Trichotomospora" Lian, Liu & Zhang 1985
- "Uniformispora" Kalkreuter et al. 2024

== See also ==
- List of bacterial orders
- List of bacteria genera
